= Academy Award for Technical Achievement =

Film industry honor

The Technical Achievement Award is one of three Scientific and Technical Awards given from time to time by the Academy of Motion Picture Arts and Sciences. (The other two awards are the Scientific and Engineering Award and the Academy Award of Merit.) The Technical Achievement Award is an honorary award that is given annually to those whose particular technical accomplishments have contributed to the progress of the motion picture industry. The award is a certificate, which describes the achievement and lists the names of those being honored for the particular contribution. These awards are usually given at a dinner ceremony held weeks prior to the Academy Awards broadcast and a brief excerpt is shown in the Oscars telecast.

== Winners ==
See Category:Academy Award for Technical Achievement winners.

The tables below show the honorees as listed in the Academy Awards database.

=== 1930–1950 ===
Technical Achievement Award recipients, by year of award (1930–1950)
Year	Recipient(s)	Department
1930/1931 (4th)	Electrical Research Products, Inc., for moving coil microphone transmitters	Sound
1930/1931 (4th)	RKO Radio Pictures, Inc., for reflex type microphone concentrators	Sound
1930/1931 (4th)	RCA-Photophone, Inc., for ribbon microphone transmitters	Sound
1931/1932 (5th)	Eastman Kodak Company for its Type II-B Sensitometer	Laboratory
1932/1933 (6th)	Fox Film Corporation, Fred Jackman and Warner Bros. Pictures, Inc., and Sidney Sanders of RKO Studios, Inc., for their development and effective use of the translucent cellulose screen in composite photography	Special Photographic
1934 (7th)	Columbia Pictures Corporation for their application of the Vertical Cut Disc Method (hill and dale recording) to actual studio production, with their recording of the sound on the picture One Night of Love	Sound
1934 (7th)	Bell and Howell Company for their development of the Bell and Howell Fully Automatic Sound and Picture Printer	Laboratory
1935 (8th)	Metro-Goldwyn-Mayer Studio for the development of anti-directional negative and positive development by means of jet turbulation, and the application of the method to all negative and print processing of the entire product of a major producing company	Laboratory
1935 (8th)	William A. Mueller of Warner Bros.-First National Studio Sound Department for his method of dubbing, in which the level of the dialogue automatically controls the level of the accompanying music and sound effects	Sound
1935 (8th)	Mole-Richardson Company for their development of the "Solar-spot" spot lamps	Lighting
1935 (8th)	Douglas Shearer and Metro-Goldwyn-Mayer Studio Sound Department for their automatic control system for cameras and sound recording machines and auxiliary stage equipment	Stage Operations
1935 (8th)	Electrical Research Products, Inc., for their study and development of equipment to analyze and measure flutter resulting from the travel of the film through the mechanisms used in the recording and reproduction of sound	Sound
1935 (8th)	Paramount Productions, Inc., for the design and construction of the Paramount transparency air turbine developing machine	Laboratory
1935 (8th)	Nathan Levinson, Director of Sound Recording for Warner Bros.-First National Studio, for the method of intercutting variable density and variable area soundtracks to secure an increase in the effective volume range of sound recorded for motion pictures.	Sound
1936 (9th)	RCA Manufacturing Co., Inc., for their development of a method of recording and printing sound records utilizing a restricted spectrum (known as an ultra-violet light recording)	Sound
1936 (9th)	Electrical Research Products, Inc., for the ERPI "Type Q" portable recording channel	Sound
1936 (9th)	RCA Manufacturing Co., Inc., for furnishing a practical design and specifications for a non-slip printer	Laboratory
1936 (9th)	United Artists Studio Corp., for the development of a practical, efficient and quiet wind machine.	Stage Operations
1937 (10th)	John Arnold and the Metro-Goldwyn-Mayer Studio Camera Department for their improvement of the semi-automatic follow focus device and its application to all of the cameras used by the Metro-Goldwyn-Mayer Studio	Photography
1937 (10th)	John Livadary, Director of Sound Recording for Columbia Pictures Corporation, for the application of the bi-planar light valve to motion picture sound recording	Sound
1937 (10th)	Thomas T. Moulton and the United Artists Studio Sound Department for the application to motion picture sound recording of volume indicators that have peak reading response and linear decibel scales	Sound
1937 (10th)	RCA Manufacturing Co., Inc., for the introduction of the modulated high-frequency method of determining optimum photographic processing conditions for variable width soundtracks	Laboratory
1937 (10th)	Joseph E. Robbins and Paramount Pictures, Inc., for an exceptional application of acoustic principles to the soundproofing of gasoline generators and water pumps	Stage Operations
1937 (10th)	Douglas Shearer and the Metro-Goldwyn-Mayer Studio Sound Department for the design of the film drive mechanism as incorporated in the ERPI 1010 reproducer	Sound
1938 (11th)	John Aalberg and the RKO Radio Studio Sound Department for the application of compression to variable area recording in motion picture production	Sound
1938 (11th)	Byron Haskin and the Special Effect Department of Warner Bros. Studio for pioneering the development and for the first practical application to motion picture production of the triple head background projector	Special Photographic
1939 (12th)	George H. Anderson of Warner Bros. Studio for an improved positive head for sun arcs	Lighting
1939 (12th)	John Arnold of Metro-Goldwyn-Mayer Studio for the M-G-M mobile camera crane	Camera Cranes
1939 (12th)	Thomas T. Moulton, Fred Albin, and the Sound Department of the Samuel Goldwyn Studio for the origination and application of the Delta DB test for sound recording in motion pictures	Laboratory
1939 (12th)	Farciot Edouart, Joseph E. Robbins, William Rudolph, and Paramount Pictures, Inc., for the design and construction of a quiet portable treadmill	Stage Operations
1939 (12th)	Emery Huse and Ralph B. Atkinson of the Eastman Kodak Company for their specifications for chemical analysis of photographic developers and fixing baths	Laboratory
1939 (12th)	Harold Nye of Warner Bros. Studio for a miniature incandescent spot lamp	Lighting
1939 (12th)	A. J. Tondreau of Warner Bros. Studio for the design and manufacture of an improved soundtrack printer	Laboratory
1939 (12th)	For important contributions in cooperative development of new improved Process Projection Equipment: F. R. Abbott, Haller Belt, Alan Cook, and the Bausch & Lomb Optical Company for faster projection lenses; The Mitchell Camera Company for a new type process projection head; Mole-Richardson Company for a new type automatically controlled projection arc lamp; Charles Handley, David Joy and the National Carbon Company for improved and more stable high-intensity carbons; Winton Hoch and the Technicolor Motion Picture Corp., for an auxiliary optical system; Don Musgrave and Selznick International Pictures, Inc., for pioneering in the use of coordinated equipment in the production, Gone with the Wind	Special Photographic
1940 (13th)	Warner Bros. Studio Art Department and Anton Grot for the design and perfection of the Warner Bros. water ripple and wave illusion machine.	Stage Operations
1941 (14th)	Ray Wilkinson and the Paramount Studio Laboratory for pioneering in the use of and for the first practical application to release printing of fine grain positive stock	Film
1941 (14th)	Charles Lootens and the Republic Studio Sound Department for pioneering the use of and for the first practical application to motion picture production of CLASS B push-pull variable area recording	Sound
1941 (14th)	Wilbur Silvertooth and the Paramount Studio Engineering Department for the design and computation of a relay condenser system applicable to transparency process projection, delivering considerably more usable light	Special Photographic
1941 (14th)	Paramount Pictures, Inc., and 20th Century Fox Film Corp., for the development and first practical application to motion picture production of an automatic scene slating device	Stage Operations
1941 (14th)	Douglas Shearer and the Metro-Goldwyn-Mayer Studio Sound Department, and to Loren Ryder and the Paramount Studio Sound Department for pioneering the development of fine grain emulsions for variable density original sound recording in studio production	Sound
1942 (15th)	Robert Henderson and the Paramount Studio Engineering and Transparency Departments for the design and construction of adjustable light bridges and screen frames for transparency process photography	Special Photographic
1942 (15th)	Daniel J. Bloomberg and the Republic Studio Sound Department for the design and application to motion picture production of a device for marking action negative for pre-selection purposes	Laboratory
1943 (16th)	Daniel J. Bloomberg and the Republic Studio Sound Department for the design and development of an inexpensive method of converting Moviolas to Class B push-pull reproduction	Sound
1943 (16th)	Charles Galloway Clarke and the 20th Century Fox Studio Camera Department for the development and practical application of a device for composing artificial clouds into motion picture scenes during production photography	Photography
1943 (16th)	Farciot Edouart and the Paramount Studio Transparency Department for an automatic electric transparency cueing timer	Special Photographic
1943 (16th)	Willard H. Turner and the RKO Radio Studio Sound Department for the design and construction of the phono-cue starter	Sound
1944 (17th)	Linwood Dunn, Cecil Love, and ACME Tool and Manufacturing Company for the design and construction of the Acme-Dunn Optical Printer	Laboratory
1944 (17th)	Grover Laube and the 20th Century Fox Studio Camera Department for the development of a continuous loop projection device	Sound
1944 (17th)	Western Electric Company for the design and construction of the 1126A Limiting Amplifier for variable density sound recording	Sound
1944 (17th)	Russell Brown, Ray Hinsdale, and Joseph E. Robbins for the development and production use of the Paramount floating hydraulic boat rocker	Stage Operations
1944 (17th)	Gordon Jennings for the design and construction of the Paramount nodal point tripod	Photography
1944 (17th)	Radio Corporation of America and the RKO Radio Studio Sound Department for the design and construction of the RKO reverberation chamber	Sound
1944 (17th)	Daniel J. Bloomberg and the Republic Studio Sound Department for the design and development of a multi-interlock selector switch	Stage Operations
1944 (17th)	Bernard B. Brown and John P. Livadary for the design and engineering of a separate soloist and chorus recording room	Sound
1944 (17th)	Paul Zeff, S. J. Twining and George Seid of the Columbia Studio Laboratory for the formula and application to production of a simplified variable area sound negative developer	Laboratory
1944 (17th)	Paul Lerpae for the design and construction of the Paramount traveling matte projection and photographing device	Special Photographic
1945 (18th)	Loren L. Ryder, Charles R. Daily, and the Paramount Studio Sound Department for the design, construction, and use of the first dial-controlled step-by-step sound channel line-up and test circuit	Sound
1945 (18th)	Michael S. Leshing, Benjamin C. Robinson, Arthur B. Chatelain, and Robert C. Stevens of 20th Century Fox Studio and John G. Capstaff of Kodak Company for the 20th Century Eastman-Fox film processing machine	Laboratory
1946 (19th)	Harlan L. Baumbach and the Paramount West Coast Laboratory for an improved method for the quantitative determination of hydroquinone and metol in photographic developing baths	Laboratory
1946 (19th)	Herbert E. Britt for the development and application of formulas and equipment for producing cloud and smoke effects	Stage Operations
1946 (19th)	Burton F. Miller and the Warner Bros. Studio Sound and Electrical Departments for the design and construction of a motion picture arc lighting generator filter	Lighting
1946 (19th)	Carl Faulkner of the 20th Century Fox Studio Sound Department for the reversed bias method, including a double bias method for light valve and galvanometer density recording	Sound
1946 (19th)	The Mole-Richardson Company for the Type 450 super high-intensity carbon arc lamp	Lighting
1946 (19th)	Arthur F. Blinn, Robert O. Cook, C. O. Slyfield, and the Walt Disney Studio Sound Department for the design and development of an audio finder and track viewer for checking and locating noise in soundtracks	Sound
1946 (19th)	Burton F. Miller and the Warner Bros Studio Sound Department for the design and application of an equalizer to eliminate relative spectral energy distortion in electronic compressors	Sound
1946 (19th)	Marty Martin and Hal Adkins of the RKO Radio Studio Miniature Department for the design and construction of equipment providing visual bullet effects	Stage Operations
1946 (19th)	Harold Nye and the Warner Bros Studio Electrical Department for the development of the electronically controlled fire and gaslight effect	Stage Operations
1947 (20th)	Nathan Levinson and the Warner Bros. Studio Sound Department for the design and construction of a constant-speed sound editing machine	Sound
1947 (20th)	Farciot Edouart, C.R. Daily, Hal Corl, H. G. Cartwright, and the Paramount Studio Transparency and Engineering Departments for the first application of a special anti-solarizing glass to high-intensity background and spot arc projectors	Lighting
1947 (20th)	Fred Ponedel of Warner Bros. Studio for pioneering the fabrication and practical application to motion picture color photography of large translucent photographic backgrounds	Special Photographic
1947 (20th)	Kurt Singer and the RCA Victor Division of Radio Corporation of America for the design and development of a continuously variable band-elimination filter	Sound
1947 (20th)	James Gibbons of Warner Bros. Studio for the development and production of large dyed plastic filters for motion picture photography	Lighting
1948 (21st)	Marty Martin, Jack Lannan, Russell Shearman, and the RKO Radio Studio Special Effects Department for the development of a new method of simulating falling snow on motion picture sets	Lighting
1948 (21st)	A. J. Moran and the Warner Bros. Studio Electrical Department for a method of remote control for shutters on motion picture arc lighting equipment	Stage Operations
1949 (22nd)	Loren L. Ryder, Bruce H. Denney, Robert J. Carr, and the Paramount Studio Sound Department for the development and application of the supersonic playback and public address system	Special Photographic
1949 (22nd)	M. B. Paul for the first successful large-area seamless translucent backgrounds	Stage Operations
1949 (22nd)	Herbert E. Britt for the development and application of formulas and equipment producing artificial snow and ice for dressing motion picture sets	Stage Operations
1949 (22nd)	André Coutant and Jacques Mathot for the design of the Eclair camerette	Camera
1949 (22nd)	Charles R. Daily and Stephen Csillag and the Paramount Studio Engineering, Editorial, and Music Departments for a new precision method of computing variable tempo click tracks	Editorial
1949 (22nd)	The International Projector Corporation for a simplified and self-adjusting take-up device for projection machines	Photography
1949 (22nd)	Alexander Velcoff for the application to the production of the infra-red photographic evaluator	Projection
1950 (23rd)	No award	—

=== 1951–1970 ===
Technical Achievement Award recipients, by year of nomination (1951–1970)
Year	Recipient(s)	Department
1951 (24th)	Richard M. Haff, Frank P. Herrnfeld, Garland C. Misener, and the Ansco Film Division of General Aniline & Film Corporation for the development of the Ansco color scene tester	Laboratory
1951 (24th)	Fred Ponedel, Ralph Ayres, and George Brown of Warner Bros. Studio for an air-driven water motor to provide flow, wake, and white water for marine sequences in motion pictures	Stage Operations
1951 (24th)	Glen Robinson and the Metro-Goldwyn-Mayer Studio Construction Department for the development of a new music wire and cable cutter	Stage Operations
1951 (24th)	Jack Gaylord and the Metro-Goldwyn-Mayer Studio Construction Department for the development of balsa falling snow	Stage Operations
1951 (24th)	Carlos Rivas of Metro-Goldwyn-Mayer Studio for the development of an automatic magnetic film splicer	Editorial
1952 (25th)	The Projection, Still Photographic, and Development Engineering Departments of Metro-Goldwyn-Mayer Studio for an improved method of projecting photographic backgrounds	Special Photographic
1952 (25th)	John G. Frayne and R.R. Scoville and Westrex Corporation for a method of measuring distortion in sound reproduction	Sound
1952 (25th)	Photo Research Corporation for creating the Spectra color temperature meter	Photography
1952 (25th)	Gustav Jirouch for the design of the Robot automatic film splicer	Editorial
1952 (25th)	Carlos Rivas of Metro-Goldwyn-Mayer Studio for the development of a sound reproducer for magnetic film	Sound
1953 (26th)	Westrex Corporation for the design and construction of a new film editing machine	Editorial
1954 (27th)	David S. Horsley and the Universal-International Studio Special Photographic Department for a portable remote control device for process projectors	Special Photographic
1954 (27th)	Karl Freund and Frank Crandell of Photo Research Corporation for the design and development of a direct reading brightness meter	Photography
1954 (27th)	Wesley C. Miller, J.W. Stafford, K.M. Frierson, and the Metro-Goldwyn-Mayer Studio Sound Department for an electronic sound printing comparison device	Sound
1954 (27th)	John P. Livadary and Lloyd Russell and the Columbia Studio Sound Department for an improved limiting amplifier as applied to sound level comparison devices	Sound
1954 (27th)	Roland Miller and Max Goeppinger of Magnascope Corporation for the design and development of a cathode ray magnetic soundtrack viewer	Sound
1954 (27th)	Carlos Rivas, G.M. Sprague, and the Metro-Goldwyn-Mayer Studio Sound Department for the design of a magnetic sound editing machine	Sound
1954 (27th)	Fred Wilson of the Samuel Goldwyn Studio Sound Department for the design of a variable multiple-band equalizer	Sound
1954 (27th)	P.C. Young of the Metro-Goldwyn-Mayer Studio Projection Department for the practical application of a variable focal length attachment to motion picture projector lenses	Projection
1954 (27th)	Fred Knoth and Orien Ernst of the Universal-International Studio Technical Department for the development of a hand portable, electric, dry oil-fog machine	Stage Operations
1955 (28th)	20th Century Fox Studio and the Bausch & Lomb Optical Company for the new combination lenses for CinemaScope Photography	Lenses and Filters
1955 (28th)	Walter Jolley, Maurice Larson, R.H. Spies of 20th Century Fox Studio for a spraying process that creates simulated metallic surfaces	Props
1955 (28th)	Steve Krilanovich for an improved camera dolly incorporating multi-directional steering	Camera Cranes
1955 (28th)	Dave Anderson of 20th Century-Fox Studio for an improved spotlight capable of maintaining a fixed circle of light at constant intensity over varied distances	Lighting
1955 (28th)	Loren L. Ryder, Charles West, Henry Fracker, and the Paramount Studios for a projection film index to establish proper framing for various aspect ratios	Projection
1955 (28th)	Farciot Edouart, Hal Corl, and the Paramount Studio Transparency Department for an improved dual stereopticon background projector	Special Photographic
1956 (29th)	Richard H. Ranger of Rangertone, Inc., for the development of a synchronous recording and reproducing system for quarter-inch magnetic tape	Sound
1956 (29th)	Ted Hirsch, Carl Hauge, and Edward H. Reichard of Consolidated Film Industries for an automatic scene counter for laboratory projection rooms	Laboratory
1956 (29th)	The Technical Departments of Paramount Pictures Corp., for the engineering and development of the Paramount light-weight horizontal-movement VistaVision camera	Camera
1956 (29th)	Roy C. Stewart and sons of Stewart-Trans Lux Corp., Dr. C.R. Daily, and the Transparency Department of Paramount Pictures Corp., for the engineering and development of the HiTrans and Para-HiTrans rear projection screens	Special Photographic
1956 (29th)	The Construction Department of Metro-Goldwyn-Mayer Studio for a new hand-portable fog machine	Stage Operations
1956 (29th)	Daniel J. Bloomberg, John Pond, William Wade, and the Engineering and Camera Departments of Republic Studio for the Naturama adaptation to the Mitchell camera	Photography
1957 (30th)	Charles E. Sutter, William B. Smith of Paramount Pictures Corp., and General Cable Corp., for the engineering and application to studio use of aluminum lightweight electrical cable and connectors.	Stage Operations
1958 (31st)	Willy Borberg of the General Precision Laboratory, Inc., for the development of a high-speed intermittent movement for 35mm motion picture theatre projection equipment	Projection
1958 (31st)	Fred Ponedel, George Brown, and Conrad Boye of the Warner Bros. Special Effects Department for the design and fabrication of a new rapid-fire marble gun	Stage Operations
1959 (32nd)	Ub Iwerks of Walt Disney Productions for the design of an improved optical printer for special effects and matte shots	Laboratory
1959 (32nd)	E.L. Stones, Glen Robinson, Winfield Hubbard, and Luther Newman of the Metro-Goldwyn-Mayer Studio Construction Department for the design of a multiple cable remote-controlled winch	Stage Operations
1960 (33rd)	Arthur Holcomb, Petro Vlahos, and Columbia Studio Camera Department for a camera flicker indicating device	Photography
1960 (33rd)	Anthony Paglia and the 20th Century Fox Studio Mechanical Effects Department for the design and construction of a miniature flak gun and ammunition	Stage Operations
1960 (33rd)	Carl Hauge, Robert Grubel, and Edward H. Reichard of Consolidated Film Industries for the development of an automatic developer replenisher system	Laboratory
1961 (34th)	Hurletron, Inc., Electric Eye Equipment Division, for an automatic light changing system for motion picture printers	Laboratory
1961 (34th)	Wadsworth E. Pohl and Technicolor Corp., for an integrated sound and picture transfer process	Laboratory
1962 (35th)	Electro-Voice, Inc., for a highly directional dynamic line microphone.	Sound
1962 (35th)	Louis G. MacKenzie for a selective sound effects repeater	Sound
1963 (36th)	Douglas Shearer and A. Arnold Gillespie of Metro-Goldwyn-Mayer Studios for the engineering of an improved Background Process Projection System.	Special Photographic
1964 (37th)	Milton Forman, Richard B. Glickman, and Daniel J. Pearlman of ColorTran Industries for advancements in the design and application to motion picture photography of lighting units using quartz iodine lamps	Lighting
1964 (37th)	Stewart Filmscreen Corporation for a seamless translucent Blue Screen for Traveling Matte Color Cinematography	Special Photographic
1964 (37th)	Anthony Paglia and the 20th Century Fox Studio Mechanical Effects Department for an improved method of producing Explosion Flash Effects for motion pictures	Stage Operations
1964 (37th)	Edward H. Reichard and Carl W. Hauge of Consolidated Film Industries for the design of a Proximity Cue Detector and its application to motion picture printers	Laboratory
1964 (37th)	Edward H. Reichard, Leonard L. Sokolow and Carl W. Hauge of Consolidated Film Industries for the design and application to motion picture laboratory practice of a Stroboscopic Scene Tester for color and black-and-white film	Laboratory
1964 (37th)	Nelson Tyler for the design and construction of an improved Helicopter Camera System	Photography
1965 (38th)	No award	—
1966 (39th)	Panavision, Incorporated, for the design of the Panatron Power Inverter and its application to motion picture camera operation	Stage Operations
1966 (39th)	Carroll Knudson for the production of a Composer's Manual for Motion Picture Music Synchronization	Editorial
1966 (39th)	Ruby Raksin for the production of a Composer's Manual for Motion Picture Music Synchronization	Editorial
1967 (40th)	The Electro-Optical Division of Kollmorgen Corporation for the design and development of a series of Motion Picture Projection Lenses	Lenses and Filters
1967 (40th)	Panavision, Incorporated, for a Variable Speed Motor for Motion Picture Cameras	Camera
1967 (40th)	Fred R. Wilson of the Samuel Goldwyn Studio Sound Department for an Audio Level Clamper	Sound
1967 (40th)	Waldon O. Watson and the Universal City Studio Radio Department for new concepts in the design of a Music Scoring Stage	Sound
1968 (41st)	Carl W. Hauge and Edward H. Reichard of Consolidated Film Industries and E. Michael Meahl and Roy J. Ridenour of Ramtronics for engineering an automatic exposure control for printing-machine lamps	Laboratory
1968 (41st)	Eastman Kodak Company for a new direct positive film and to Consolidated Film Industries for the application of this film to the making of post-production work prints	Film
1969 (42nd)	Oto Popleka of Magna-Tech Electronics Company, Inc., for the development of an Electronically Controlled Looping System	Sound
1969 (42nd)	Fenton Hamilton of Metro-Goldwyn-Mayer Studios for the concept and engineering of a mobile battery power unit for location lighting	Lighting
1969 (42nd)	Panavision, Incorporated for the design and development of the Panaspeed Motion Picture Camera Motor	Camera
1969 (42nd)	Robert M. Flynn and Russell Hessy of Universal City Studios, Inc., for a machine-gun modification for motion picture photography	Stage Operations
1970 (43rd)	Sylvania Electric Products, Inc., for the development and introduction of a series of compact tungsten halogen lamps for motion picture production	Lighting
1970 (43rd)	B.J. Losmandy for the concept, design, and application of micro-miniature solid state amplifier modules used in motion picture recording equipment	Sound
1970 (43rd)	Eastman Kodak Company and Photo Electronics Corporation for the design and engineering of an improved video color analyzer for motion picture laboratories	Laboratory
1970 (43rd)	Electro Sound Incorporated for the design and introduction of the Series 8000 Sound System for motion picture theatres	Sound

=== 1971–1990 ===
Technical Achievement Award recipients, by year of nomination (1971–1990)
Year	Recipient(s)	Department
1971 (44th)	Thomas Jefferson Hutchinson, James R. Rochester, and Fenton Hamilton for the development and introduction of the Sunbrute system of xenon arc lamps for location lighting in motion picture production	Lighting
1971 (44th)	Photo Research Corporation, a division of Kollmorgen Corporation, for the development and introduction of the film-lens balanced Three Color Meter	Photography
1971 (44th)	Robert D. Auguste and Cinema Products Company for the development and introduction of a new crystal-controlled lightweight motor for the 35mm motion picture Arriflex camera	Camera
1971 (44th)	Producers Service Corporation and Consolidated Film Industries; and to Cinema Research Corporation and Research Products, Inc., for the engineering and implementation of fully automated blow-up motion picture printing systems	Laboratory
1971 (44th)	Cinema Products Company for a control motor to actuate zoom lenses on motion picture cameras	Camera
1972 (45th)	Photo Research Corporation, a division of Kollmorgen Corporation, and PSC Technology Inc., Acme Products Division, for the Spectra Film Gate Photometer for motion picture printers	Laboratory
1972 (45th)	Carter Equipment Company, Inc. and Ramtronics for the RAMtronics light-valve photometer for motion picture printers	Laboratory
1972 (45th)	David Degenkolb, Harry Larson, Manfred Michelson, and Fred Scobey of DeLuxe General Incorporated for the development of a computerized motion picture printer and process control system	Laboratory
1972 (45th)	Jiro Mukai and Ryusho Hirose of Canon, Inc., and Wilton R. Holm of the AMPTP Motion Picture and Television Research Center for the development of the Canon Macro Zoom Lens for motion picture photography	Lenses and Filters
1972 (45th)	Philip V. Palmquist of Minnesota Mining and Manufacturing Co., Dr. Herbert Meyer of the Motion Picture and Television Research Center, and to Charles D. Staffell of the Rank Organization for the development of a successful embodiment of the reflex background projection system for composite cinematography	Props
1972 (45th)	E.H. Geissler and G.M. Berggren of Wil-Kin Inc., for the engineering of the Ultra-Vision Motion Picture Theater Projection System	Projection
1973 (46th)	Rosco Laboratories, Inc., for the technical advances and the development of a complete system of light-control materials for motion picture photography	Lenses and Filters
1973 (46th)	Richard H. Vetter of Todd-AO Corporation for the design of an improved anamorphic focusing system for motion picture photography	Lenses and Filters
1974 (47th)	The Elemack Company, Rome, Italy, for the design and development of their Spyder camera dolly	Camera Cranes
1974 (47th)	Louis Ami of Universal City Studios for the design and construction of a reciprocating camera platform used when photographing special visual effects for motion pictures	Stage Operations
1975 (48th)	Lawrence W. Butler and Roger Banks for the concept of applying low inertia and stepping electric motors to film transport systems and optical printers for motion picture production	Special Photographic
1975 (48th)	David Degenkolb and Fred Scobey of Deluxe General Incorporated and John C. Dolan and Richard Dubois of the Akwaklame Company for the development of a technique for silver recovery from photographic wash-waters by ion exchange	Laboratory
1975 (48th)	Joseph Westheimer for the development of a device to obtain shadowed titles on motion picture films	Special Photographic
1975 (48th)	Carter Equipment Company, Inc. and Ramtronics for the engineering and manufacture of a computerized tape punching system for programming laboratory printing machines	Laboratory
1975 (48th)	Hollywood Film Company for the engineering and manufacture of a computerized tape punching system for programming laboratory printing machines	Laboratory
1975 (48th)	Bell & Howell for the engineering and manufacture of a computerized tape punching system for programming laboratory printing machines	Laboratory
1975 (48th)	Fredrik Schlyter for the engineering and manufacture of a computerized tape punching system for programming laboratory printing machines	Laboratory
1976 (49th)	Fred Bartscher of Kollmorgen Corporation and to Glenn Berggren of the Schneider Corporation for the design and development of a single-lens magnifier for motion picture projection lenses	Lenses and Filters
1976 (49th)	Panavision, Incorporated for the design and development of super-speed lenses for motion picture photography	Lenses and Filters
1976 (49th)	Hiroshi Suzukawa of Canon and Wilton R. Holm of AMPTP Motion Picture and Television Research Center for the design and development of super-speed lenses for motion picture photography	Lenses and Filters
1976 (49th)	Carl Zeiss Company for the design and development of super-speed lenses for motion picture photography	Lenses and Filters
1976 (49th)	Photo Research Corporation, a division of Kollmorgen Corporation for the engineering and manufacture of the Spectra TriColor Meter	Photography
1977 (50th)	Ernst F. Nettman of the Astrovision Division of Continental Camera Systems, Incorporated, for the engineering of its Periscope Aerial Camera System	Camera
1977 (50th)	EECO (Electronic Engineering Company of California) for developing a method for interlocking non-sprocketed film and tape media used in motion picture production	Systems
1977 (50th)	Dr. Bernhard Kühl and Werner Block of OSRAM, GmbH, for the development of the HMI high-efficiency discharge lamp for motion picture lighting	Lighting
1977 (50th)	Panavision, Incorporated for the design of Panalite, a camera-mounted controllable light for motion picture photography	Lighting
1977 (50th)	Panavision, Incorporated for the engineering of the Panahead gearhead for motion picture cameras	Stage Operations
1977 (50th)	Piclear, Inc, for originating and developing an attachment to motion picture projectors to improve screen image quality	Laboratory
1978 (51st)	Karl Macher and Glenn M. Berggren of Isco Optische Werke for the development and introduction of the Cinelux-ULTRA Lens for 35mm Motion Picture Projection	Lenses and Filters
1978 (51st)	David J. Degenkolb, Arthur L. Forde, and Fred J. Scobey of DeLuxe General, Incorporated, for the development of a Method to Recycle Motion Picture Laboratory Photographic Wash Waters by Ion Exchange	Laboratory
1978 (51st)	Kiichi Sekiguchi of CINE-FI International for the development of the CINE-FI Auto Radio Sound System for Drive-In Theaters	Systems
1978 (51st)	Leonard Chapman of Leonard Equipment Company, for the design and manufacture of a small, mobile, motion picture camera platform known as the Chapman Hustler Dolly	Camera Cranes
1978 (51st)	James L. Fisher of J.L. Fisher, Incorporated, for the design and manufacture of a small, mobile, motion picture camera platform known as the Fisher Model Ten Dolly	Camera Cranes
1978 (51st)	Robert Stindt of Production Grip Equipment Company, for the design and manufacture of a small, mobile, motion picture camera platform known as the Stindt Dolly	Camera Cranes
1979 (52nd)	Michael V. Chewey, Walter G. Eggers, and Allen Hecht of M-G-M Laboratories for the development of a Computer-controlled Paper Tape Programmer System and its applications in the motion picture laboratory	Laboratory
1979 (52nd)	Irwin Young, Paul Kaufman, and Fredrik Schlyter of Du Art Film Laboratories, Incorporated, for the development of a Computer-controlled Paper Tape Programmer System and its applications in the motion picture laboratory	Laboratory
1979 (52nd)	James S. Stanfield and Paul W. Trester for the development and manufacture of a device for the repair or protection of sprocket holes in motion picture film	Projection
1979 (52nd)	Zoran Perisic of Courier Films, Ltd., for the Zoptic Special Optical Effects Device for motion picture photography	Special Photographic
1979 (52nd)	A. D. Flowers and Logan R. Frazee for the development of a device to control flight patterns of miniature airplanes during motion picture photography	Stage Operations
1979 (52nd)	Photo Research Corporation, a division of Kollmorgen Corporation for the development of the Spectra Series II Cine Special Exposure Meter for motion picture photography	Photography
1979 (52nd)	Bruce Lyon and John Lamb for the development of a Video Animation System for testing motion picture animation sequences	Cartoon Process
1979 (52nd)	Ross Lowell of Lowel-Light Manufacturing, Incorporated, for the development of compact lighting equipment for motion picture photography	Lighting
1980 (53rd)	Carter Equipment Company for the development of a continuous contact, total immersion, additive color motion picture printer	Laboratory
1980 (53rd)	Hollywood Film Company for the development of a continuous-contact, total immersion, additive color motion picture printer	Laboratory
1980 (53rd)	fr: André Debrie for the development of a continuous contact, total immersion, additive color motion picture printer	Laboratory
1980 (53rd)	Charles Vaughn and Eugene Nottingham of Cinetron Computer Systems, Incorporated, for the development of a versatile general purpose computer system for animation and optical effects motion picture photography	Systems
1980 (53rd)	John W. Lang, Walter Hrastnik, and Charles J. Watson of Bell and Howell Company for the development and manufacture of a modular continuous contact motion picture film	Laboratory
1980 (53rd)	Worth Baird of LaVezzi Machine Works, Incorporated, for the advanced design and manufacture of a film sprocket for motion picture projectors	Projection
1980 (53rd)	Peter Regla and Dan Slater of Elicon for the development of a follow-focus system for motion picture optical effects printers and animation stands	Photography
1981 (54th)	Hal Landaker for the concept and to Alan Landaker for the engineering of the Burbank Studios' Production Sound Department 24-frame color video system	Special Photographic
1981 (54th)	Bill Hogan of Ruxton, Ltd., and Richard J. Stumpf and Daniel R. Brewer of Universal City Studios' Production Sound Department, for the engineering of a 24-frame color video system	Special Photographic
1981 (54th)	John DeMuth, for the engineering of a 24-frame video system	Special Photographic
1981 (54th)	Ernst F. Nettman, of Continental Camera Systems, Inc., for the development of a pitching lens for motion picture photography	Camera
1981 (54th)	Bill Taylor of Universal City Studios for the concept and specifications for a Two Format, Rotating Head, Aerial Image Optical Printer	Special Photographic
1981 (54th)	Peter D. Parks of Oxford Scientific Films for the development of the OSF microcosmic zoom device for microscopic photography	Camera
1981 (54th)	Louis Stankiewicz and H.L. Blachford for the development of Baryfol sound barrier materials	Stage Operations
1981 (54th)	Dennis Muren and Stuart Ziff of Industrial Light and Magic, Incorporated for the development of a Motion Picture Figure Mover for animation photography	Stage Operations
1982 (55th)	Richard W. Deats for the design and manufacture of the "Little Big Crane" for motion picture production	Camera Cranes
1982 (55th)	Cons Tresfon and Adriaan De Rooy of Egripment, and to Ed Phillips and Carlos DeMattos of Matthews Studio Equipment, Incorporated, for the design and manufacture of the "Tulip Crane" for motion picture production	Camera Cranes
1982 (55th)	Bran Ferren of Associates and Ferren for the design and development of a computerized lightning effect system for motion picture photography	Stage Operations
1982 (55th)	Christie Electric Corp. and LaVezzi Machine Works, Inc., for the design and manufacture of the Ultramittent film transport for Christie motion picture projectors	Projection
1983 (56th)	William G. Krokaugger of Mole-Richardson Company for the design and engineering of a portable, 12,000 watt, lighting-control dimmer for use in motion picture production	Lighting
1983 (56th)	Charles L. Watson, Larry L. Langrehr, and John H. Steiner for the development of the BHP (electro-mechanical) fader for use on continuous motion picture contact printers	Laboratory
1983 (56th)	Elizabeth D. De La Mare of De La Mare Engineering, Incorporated, for the progressive development and continuous research of special effects pyrotechnics originally designed by Glenn W. De La Mare for motion picture production	Stage Operations
1983 (56th)	Douglas Fries, John Lacey, and Michael Sicrist for the design and engineering of a 35mm reflex conversion camera system for special effects photography	Camera
1983 (56th)	Jack Cashin of Ultra-Stereo Labs, Incorporated, for the engineering and development of a 4-channel, stereophonic, decoding system for optical motion picture soundtrack reproduction	Sound
1983 (56th)	David J. Degenkolb for the design and development of an automated device used in the silver recovery process in motion picture laboratories	Laboratory
1984 (57th)	Nat Tiffen of Tiffen Manufacturing Corporation for the production of high-quality, durable, laminated color filters for motion picture photography	Lenses and Filters
1984 (57th)	Don Trumbull, Jonathan Erland, Stephen Fog, and Paul Burk of Apogee, Inc., for the design and development of the "Blue Max" high-power, blue-flux projector for traveling matte composite photography	Special Photographic
1984 (57th)	Jonathan Erland and Robert Bealmear of Apogee, Incorporated, for an innovative design for front projection screens and an improved method for their construction	Special Photographic
1984 (57th)	Howard J. Preston of Preston Cinema Systems for the design and development of a variable speed control device with automatic exposure compensation for motion picture cameras	Camera
1985 (58th)	David W. Spencer for the development of the Animation Photo Transfer (APT) process	Cartoon Process
1985 (58th)	Harrison & Harrison, Optical Engineers, for the invention and development of Harrison Diffusion filters for motion picture photography	Lenses and Filters
1985 (58th)	Larry Barton of Cinematography Electronics, Inc., for a precision speed crystal-controlled device for motion picture photography	Camera
1985 (58th)	Alan Landaker of The Burbank Studios for the Mark III Camera Drive for motion picture photography	Camera
1986 (59th)	Lee Electric (Lightning) Ltd., for the design and development of an electronic, flicker-free, discharge lamp control system	Lighting
1986 (59th)	Peter Parks of Oxford Scientific Films' Image Quest Division for the development of a live aero-compositor for special effects photography	Special Photographic
1986 (59th)	Matt Sweeney and Lucinda Strub for the development of an automatic capsule gun for simulating bullet hits for motion picture special effects	Stage Operations
1986 (59th)	Carl E. Holmes of Carl E. Holmes Company and to Alexander Bryce of The Burbank Studios for the development of a mobile DC power supply unit for motion picture production photography	Lighting
1986 (59th)	Bran Ferren of Associates and Ferren for the development of a laser synchro-cue system for applications in the motion picture industry	Special Photographic
1986 (59th)	John L. Baptista of Metro-Goldwyn-Mayer Laboratories, Inc., for the development and installation of a computerized silver recovery operation	Laboratory
1986 (59th)	David W. Samuelson for the development of programs incorporated into a pocket computer for motion picture cinematographers, and to William B. Pollard for contributing new algorithms on which the programs are based	Photography
1986 (59th)	Hal Landaker and Alan Landaker of The Burbank Studios for the development of the Beat System low-frequency cue track for motion picture production sound recording	Sound
1987 (60th)	Ioan Allen of Dolby Laboratories, Inc., for the Cat. 43 playback-only noise reduction unit and its practical application to motion picture sound recordings	Sound
1987 (60th)	John Eppolito, Wally Gentleman, William Mesa, Les Paul Robley, and Geoffrey H. Williamson for refinements to a dual screen, front projection, and image-compositing system	Special Photographic
1987 (60th)	Jan Jacobsen for the application of a dual screen, front projection system to motion picture special effects photography	Special Photographic
1987 (60th)	Thaine Morris and David Pier for the development of DSC Spark Devices for motion picture special effects	Stage Operations
1987 (60th)	Tad Krzanowski of Industrial Light and Magic, Inc., for the development of a Wire Rig Model Support Mechanism use to control the movements of miniatures in special effects	Stage Operations
1987 (60th)	Dan C. Norris and Tim Cook of Norris Film Products for the development of a single-frame exposure system for motion picture photography	Camera
1988 (61st)	Grant Loucks of Alan Gordon Enterprises Incorporated for the design concept, and to Geoffrey H. Williamson of Wilcam for the mechanical and electrical engineering, of the Image 300 35mm High-Speed Motion Picture Camera	Camera
1988 (61st)	Michael V. Chewey III for the development of the motion picture industry's first paper tape reader incorporating microprocessor technology	Laboratory
1988 (61st)	BHP, Inc., successor to the Bell & Howell Professional Equipment Division, for the development of a high-speed reader incorporating microprocessor technology for motion picture laboratories	Laboratory
1988 (61st)	Hollywood Film Company for the development of a high-speed reader incorporating microprocessor technology for motion picture laboratories	Laboratory
1988 (61st)	Bruce W. Keller and Manfred G. Michelson of Technical Film Systems for the design and development of a high-speed light valve controller and constant current power supply for motion picture laboratories	Laboratory
1988 (61st)	Dr. Antal Lisziewicz and Glenn M. Berggren of ISCO-Optic GmbH for the design and development of the Ultra-Star series of motion picture lenses	Lenses and Filters
1988 (61st)	James K. Branch of Spectra Cine, Incorporated, and to William L. Blowers and Nasir J. Zaidi for the design and development of the Spectra CineSpot one-degree spotmeter for measuring the brightness of motion picture screens	Photography
1988 (61st)	Bob Badami, Dick Bernstein, and Bill Bernstein of Offbeat Systems for the design and development of the Streamline Scoring System, Mark IV, for motion picture music editing	Editorial
1988 (61st)	Gary Zeller of Zeller International Limited for the development of Zel-Jel fire protection barrier for motion picture stunt work	Stage Operations
1988 (61st)	Emanual Trilling of Trilling Resources Limited for the development of Stunt-Gel fire protection barrier for motion picture stunt work	Stage Operations
1988 (61st)	Paul A. Roos for the invention of a method known as Video Assist, whereby a scene being photographed on motion picture film can be viewed on a monitor and/or recorded on videotape	Systems
1989 (62nd)	Dr. Leo Cattozzo for the design and development of the CIR-Catozzo Self-Perforating Adhesive Tape Film Splicer	Editorial
1989 (62nd)	Magna-Tech Electronics Company for the introduction of the first remotely controlled Advance/Retard function for magnetic film sound dubbing	Sound
1990 (63rd)	William L. Blowers of Belco Associates, Incorporated and Thomas F. Denove for developing and manufacturing the Belco/Denove Cinemeter. This digital/analog exposure meter was specifically and uniquely designed for the cinematographer.	Photography
1990 (63rd)	Iain Neil for optical design; Takuo Miyagishima for the mechanical design; and Panavision, Incorporated for the concept and development of the Primo Series of spherical prime lenses for 35mm cinematography	Lenses and Filters
1990 (63rd)	Christopher Gilman, Harvey Hubert Jr. of the Diligent Dwarves Effects Lab for the development of the Actor Climate System, consisting of heat-transferring undergarments	Stage Operations
1990 (63rd)	Jim Graves of J&G Enterprises for the development of the Cool Suit System, consisting of heat-transferring undergarments	Stage Operations
1990 (63rd)	Bengt O. Orhall, Kenneth Lund, Bjorn Selin, and Kjell Högberg of AB Film-Teknik for developing and manufacturing the Mark IV film subtitling processor, which has increased the speed, simplified the operation, and improved the quality of subtitling	Laboratory
1990 (63rd)	Richard Mula and Pete Romano of HydroImage, Incorporated, for the development of the SeaPar 1200 watt HMI Underwater Lamp	Lighting
1990 (63rd)	Dedo Weigert of Dedo Weigert Film GmbH for the development of the Dedolight, a miniature low-voltage tungsten-halogen lighting fixture	Lighting
1990 (63rd)	Dr. Fred Kolb Jr. and Paul Preo for the concept and development of a 35mm projection test film	Film
1990 (63rd)	Peter Baldwin for the design; Dr. Paul Kiankhooy and the Lightmaker Company for the development of the Lightmaker AC/DC HMI Ballast	Lighting
1990 (63rd)	The All-Union Cinema and Photo Research Institute (NIKFI) for continuously improving and providing 3D presentations to Soviet motion picture audiences for the last 25 years	Systems

=== 1991–2002 ===
Technical Achievement Award recipients, by year of nomination (1991–2002)
Year	Recipient(s)	Department
1991 (64th)	Robert W. Stoker Jr., for the design and development of a cobweb gun, for applying non-toxic cobweb effects on motion picture sets with both safety and ease of operation	Stage Operations
1991 (64th)	James Doyle for the design and development of the Dry Fogger, which uses liquid nitrogen to produce safe, dense, low-hanging fog effects	Stage Operations
1991 (64th)	Dick Cavdek, Steve Hamerski, and Otto Nemenz International, Incorporated for the optomechanical design and development of the Canon/Nemenz Zoom Lens	Lenses and Filters
1991 (64th)	Ken Robings and Clairmont Camera for the optomechanical design and development of the Canon/Clairmont Camera Zoom Lens	Lenses and Filters
1991 (64th)	Century Precision Optics for the optomechanical design and development of the Canon/Century Precision Optics Zoom Lens	Lenses and Filters
1992 (65th)	Ira Tiffen of the Tiffen Manufacturing Corporation for the production of the Ultra Contrast Filter Series for motion picture photography	Lenses and Filters
1992 (65th)	Robert R. Burton of Audio Rents, Incorporated, for the development of the Model S-27 4-Band Splitter/Combiner	Sound
1992 (65th)	Iain Neil for the optical design and Kaz Fudano for the mechanical design of the Panavision Slant Focus Lens for motion picture photography	Lenses and Filters
1992 (65th)	Tom Bingham for the original concept and pioneering work; and Douglas Smythe and the Computer Graphics Department of Industrial Light & Magic for the development and the first implementation in feature motion pictures of the "MORF" system for digital metamorphosis of high-resolution images	Special Photographic
1993 (66th)	Wally Mills for the concept; and Gary Stadler and Gustave Parada for the design of the Cinemills Lamp Protection System	Lighting
1993 (66th)	Gary Nuzzi, David Johnsrud, William Blethen for the design and development of the Unilux H3000 Strobe Lighting System	Lighting
1993 (66th)	Harry J. Baker for the design and development of the Ronford-Baker Metal Tripods for motion picture photography	Stage Operations
1993 (66th)	Michael Dorrough for the design and development of the compound meter known as the Dorrough Audio Level Meter	Sound
1993 (66th)	David Degenkolb for the development of a Silver Recovery Ion Exchange System to eliminate hazardous waste (silver ion) in wash water and allow recycling of this water	Laboratory
1994 (67th)	B. Russell Hessey of Special Effects Spectacular, Inc. and Vincent T. Kelton for the hardware design, and George Jackman of De La Mare Engineering, Inc., for the pyrotechnic development which together comprises the non-gun safety blank firing system	Stage Operations
1994 (67th)	Frieder Hochheim, Gary H. Swink, Dr. Joe Zhou, and Don Northrop for the development of the Kino Flo Portable, Flicker Free, High Output Fluorescent Lighting System for motion picture set illumination	Lighting
1994 (67th)	Emmanuel Previnaire of Flying-Cam for his pioneering concept and for the development of mounting a motion picture camera on a remotely-controlled miniature helicopter	Photography
1994 (67th)	Jacques Sax of Sonosax for the design and development of the Sonosax SX-S portable audio mixer	Sound
1994 (67th)	Clay Davis and John Carter of Todd-AO Corporation for the pioneering effort of computer-controlled list management style ADR (Automated Dialogue Replacement)	Sound
1994 (67th)	Stephen W. Potter, John Asman, Charles Pell, and Richard Larson of LarTec Systems for the advancement and refinement of the computer-controlled list management style ADR (Automated Dialogue Replacement) system via the LarTec ADR System that has established itself as a standard of the industry	Sound
1994 (67th)	Audio Tracks, Inc., for the design and development of the ADE (Advanced Data Encoding) System which creates an encoded timecode track and database during the initial transfer of the production sound "dailies"	Sound
1994 (67th)	Colin Broad of CB Electronics for the design and development of the EDL (Edit Decision List) Lister which creates an encoded timecode track and database during the initial transfer of the production sound "dailies"	Sound
1994 (67th)	Dieter Sturm of Sturm's Special Effects Int'l for the creation and development of the Bio-Snow 2 Flake	Stage Operations
1994 (67th)	David A. Addleman and Lloyd A. Addleman for the development of the Cyberware 3030 3D Digitizer	Special Photographic
1994 (67th)	Mark R. Schneider, Herbert R. Jones, Christopher D. Conover, and John R.B. Brown for the development of the Polhemus 3 Space Digitizing System	Special Photographic
1994 (67th)	Jack Smith, Michael Crichton, and Emil Safier for pioneering computerized motion picture budgeting and scheduling	Editorial and Pre-production
1994 (67th)	Stephen Greenfield and Chris Huntley of Screenplay Systems for the development of the "Scriptor" software	Editorial and Pre-production
1994 (67th)	Art Fritzen of the California Fritzen Propeller Company as the designer and sole manufacturer of the Eight-Bladed Ritter Fan Propellers	Stage Operations
1994 (67th)	Dr. Mike Boudry of the Computer Film Company for his pioneering work in the field of film input scanning	Special Photographic
1995 (68th)	Pascal Chedeville for the design of the L.C. Concept Digital Sound System for motion picture exhibition	Sound
1995 (68th)	James Deas of the Warner Bros. Studio Facility for the design and subsequent development of an Automated Patchbay and Metering System for motion picture sound transfer and dubbing operations	Sound
1995 (68th)	Clay Davis and John Carter of Todd-AO Corporation for their pioneering efforts in creating an Automated Patchbay System for motion picture sound transfer and dubbing operations	Sound
1995 (68th)	Al Jensen, Chuck Headley, Jean Messner, and Hazem Nabulsi of CEI Technology for producing a self-contained, flicker-free Color Video-Assist Camera	Camera
1995 (68th)	Peter Denz of Präzisions-Entwicklung Denz for developing a flicker-free Color Video-Assist Camera	Camera
1995 (68th)	David Pringle and Yan Zhong Fang for the design and development of "Lightning Strikes," a flexible, high-performance electronic lightning effect system	Stage Operations
1995 (68th)	BHP, Incorporated., for their pioneering efforts in developing Digital Sound Printing Heads for motion pictures	Sound
1995 (68th)	Joe Finnegan (a.k.a. Joe Yrigoyen) for his pioneering work in developing the Air Ram for motion picture stunt effects	Stage Operations
1995 (68th)	Gary Demos, David Ruhoff, Can Cameron, and Michelle Feraud for their pioneering efforts in the creation of the Digital Productions Digital Film Compositing System	Special Photographic
1995 (68th)	Douglas Smythe, Lincoln Hu, Douglas S. Kay, and Industrial Light and Magic for their pioneering efforts in the creation of the ILM Digital Film Compositing System	Special Photographic
1995 (68th)	The Computer Film Company for their pioneering efforts in the creation of the CFC Digital Film Compositing System	Special Photographic
1995 (68th)	Institut National Polytechnique de Toulouse for the concept; Kodak Pathe CTP Cine for the prototype; and Eclair Laboratories and Martineau Industries for the development and further implementation of the Toulouse Electrolytic Silver Recovery Cell	Laboratory
1996 (69th)	Perry Kivolowitz for the primary design, and Dr. Garth Dickie for the development of the algorithms, for the shape-driven warping and morphing subsystem of the Elastic Reality Special Effects System	Special Photographic
1996 (69th)	Ken Perlin for the development of Perlin noise, a technique used to produce natural appearing textures on computer-generated surfaces for motion picture visual effects	Special Photographic
1996 (69th)	Nestor Burtnyk and Marceli Wein of the National Research Council of Canada for their pioneering work in the development of software techniques for Computer Assisted Key Framing for Character Animation	Cartoon Process
1996 (69th)	Grant Loucks for the concept and specifications of the Mark V Director's Viewfinder	Photography
1996 (69th)	Brian Knep, Craig Hayes, Rick Sayre, and Thomas Williams for the creation and development of the Direct Input Device	Special Photographic
1996 (69th)	James Kajiya and Timothy Kay for their pioneering work in producing computer-generated fur and hair in motion pictures	Special Photographic
1996 (69th)	Jeffery Yost, Christian Rouet, David Benson, and Florian Kainz for the development of a system to create and control computer-generated fur and hair in motion pictures	Special Photographic
1996 (69th)	Richard A. Prey and William N. Masten for the design and development of the Nite Sun II lighting crane and camera platform	Camera Cranes
1997 (70th)	Clark F. Crites for the design and development of the Christie ELF 1-C Endless Loop Film Transport and Storage System	Projection
1997 (70th)	Dan Leimeter and Bob Weitz for the development and implementation of a Portable Adjustment Tool for T-Style Slit Lens Assemblies	Sound
1997 (70th)	Philip C. Cory for the design and development of the Special Effects Spark Generator	Stage Operations
1997 (70th)	James M. Reilly, Douglas W. Nishimura, and Monique C. Fisher of the Rochester Institute of Technology for the creation of A-D Strips, a diagnostic tool for the detection of the presence of vinegar syndrome in processed acetate-based motion picture film	Laboratory
1997 (70th)	Jim Frazier, for the design concept, and Iain Neil and Rick Gelbard for the further design and development of the Panavision/Frazier Lens System for motion picture photography	Lenses and Filters
1997 (70th)	James F. Foley, Charles Converse and F. Edward Gardner (of UCISCO); and to Robert W. Stoker, Jr. and Matt Sweeney for the development and realization of Liquid Synthetic Air	Stage Operations
1997 (70th)	Jack Cashin, Roger Hibbard, and y Jacobson for the design, development, and implementation of a projection system analyzer	Projection
1997 (70th)	Richard Chuang, Glenn Entis and Carl Rosendahl for the concept and architecture of the Pacific Data Images (PDI) Animation System	Special Photographic
1997 (70th)	Greg Hermanovic, Kim Davidson, Mark Elendt, and Paul Breslin for the development of the procedural modeling and animation components of the Prisms software package	Special Photographic
1997 (70th)	James J. Keating, Michael Wahrman, and Richard E. Hollander for their contributions that led to the Wavefront Advanced Visualizer computer graphics system	Special Photographic
1998 (71st)	Garrett Brown and Jerry Holway, for the creation of the Skyman flying platform for Steadicam operators. This cable-driven, manned camera platform allows the operator to spin 360 degrees for unimpeded pans while controlling the downhill speed via brakes. As a device for achieving otherwise impossible shots, Skyman has had a definite influence on later cable-suspended camera systems.	Camera Cranes
1998 (71st)	Jim Rodnunsky, Jim Webber, and Bob Webber of Cablecam Systems, and Trou Bayliss, for the design and engineering of Cablecam. This radio-controlled, cable-driven camera platform with its ultra-smooth synthetic cables and powerful hydraulic motors, enables runs in excess of 3000 feet with a quick return to start. Operating unmanned, it can function at speeds and through perils that would be unsafe for onboard operators.	Camera Cranes
1998 (71st)	David DiFrancesco, N. Balasubramanian, and Tom Noggle, for their pioneering efforts in the development of laser film recording technology. This pioneering laser film recorder, designed and used for motion pictures, demonstrated the potential of this technology for recording digital data onto intermediate film stock.	Special Photographic
1998 (71st)	Mike MacKenzie, Mike Bolles, Udo Pampel, Joseph Fulmer of Industrial Light & Magic for their pioneering work in motion-controlled, silent camera dollies. This silent, high-speed motion control modification of a Panther dolly makes it possible to film moving camera composite shots of actors while recording live dialogue.	Camera Cranes
1998 (71st)	Barry Walton, Bill Schultz, Chris Barker, and David Cornelius of Sony Pictures Imageworks, for the creation of an advanced motion-controlled, silent camera dolly. This extensive modification to the Panther dolly allows high-speed moves to be silent, smooth, and stable.	Camera Cranes
1998 (71st)	Bruce Wilton and Carlos Icinkoff of Mechanical Concepts, for their modular system of motion-control rotators and movers for use in motion-control. These components have become the de facto industry standard for use in precision motion control equipment.	Camera Cranes
1998 (71st)	Remy Smith for the software and electronic design and development; and James K. Branch and Nasir J. Zaidi, for the design and development of the Spectra Professional IV-A digital exposure meter. The design and execution of the Spectra Professional IV-A meter have resulted in a practical and successful tool for the film production community.	Photography
1998 (71st)	Ivan Kruglak for his commitment to the development of a wireless transmission system for video-assisted images for the motion picture industry. Through years of persistent effort, Mr. Kruglak has commercialized and popularized a technique of great utility for motion picture camera operations. By introducing diversity antennas and a time code insertion accessory, he has optimized camera wireless video-assist components.	Camera
1998 (71st)	Dr. Douglas R. Roble for his contribution to tracking technology and for the design and implementation of the TRACK system for camera position calculation and scene reconstruction. The TRACK system is an integrated software tool that uses computer-vision techniques to extract critical 2D and the camera used to film it.	Special Photographic
1998 (71st)	Thaddeus Beier for the design and implementation of ras_track, a system for 2D tracking, stabilization, and 3D camera and object tracking. Ras_track allows the user to determine the position and location of the camera and objects in a scene by tracking points in a scanned sequence.	Special Photographic
1998 (71st)	Manfred N. Klemme and Donald E. Wetzel for the design and development of the K-Tek Microphone Boom Pole and accessories for on-set motion picture sound recording. The K-TEK series microphone boom pole provides production recording personnel with a self-lubricated, light-weight, sturdy pole with multiple accessories.	Sound
1998 (71st)	Nick Foster for his software development in the field of water simulation systems. This software technique provides an efficient and flexible method for the creation of flowing streams, oceans, tidal waves, and turbulence for motion picture visual effects.	Special Photographic
1998 (71st)	Cary Phillips for the design and development of the "Caricature" Animation System at Industrial Light & Magic. By integrating existing tools into a powerful interactive system, and adding an expressive multi-target shape interpolation-based freeform animation system, the "Caricature" system provides a degree of subtlety and refinement not possible with other systems.	Special Photographic
1998 (71st)	Dr. Mitchell J. Bogdanowicz of the Eastman Kodak Company, and Jim Meyer and Stan Miller of Rosco Laboratories, Inc., for the design of the CalColor Calibrated Color Effects Filters. Designed to correspond to the spectral sensitivity of color negative film stocks, these filters provide for improved color control in motion picture lighting.	Lenses and Filters
1998 (71st)	Dr. A. Tulsi Ram, Richard C. Sehlin, Dr. Carl F. Holtz, and David F. Kopperl of the Eastman Kodak Company, for the research and development of the concept of molecular sieves applied to improve the archival properties of processed photographic film. The use of zeolite crystals as molecular sieves to absorb moisture, acetic acid, methylene chloride, and a variety of solvents created an effective deterrent to the effects of vinegar syndrome in stored film stock.	Laboratory
1998 (71st)	Takuo Miyagishima and Albert K. Saiki of Panavision, Incorporated, for the design and development of the Eyepiece Leveler. This leveler keeps the camera eyepiece at the same level, regardless of whether the camera position is tilted up or down, enabling the camera operator to concentrate on the composition of the image.	Camera
1998 (71st)	Edmund Di Giulio and James Bartell of Cinema Products, for the design of the KeyKode Sync Reader. The KeyKode Sync Reader provides a fast, accurate, and user-friendly means of utilizing the KeyKode information on film, thereby expediting the editorial and post-production processes.	Laboratory
1998 (71st)	To Ivan Kruglak, for his pioneering concept and the development of the Coherent Time Code Slate. Time code slates have had a significant impact on the filmmaking process by simplifying post-production. This development makes the synchronization process faster and more precise, particularly when multiple cameras are used.	Editorial and Pre-production
1998 (71st)	Mike Denecke, for refining and further developing electronic time code slates. Due to their features and simplified operational procedures, the Denecke slates have had a significant impact on the motion picture industry and have become the standard for electronic time code slates.	Editorial and Pre-production
1998 (71st)	Ed Zwaneveld and Frederick Gasoi of the National Film Board of Canada, and Mike Lazaridis and Dale Brubacher-Cressman of Research in Motion, for the design and development of the DigiSync Film KeyKode Reader. The DigiSync Film KeyKode Reader provides a fast, accurate, and user-friendly means of utilizing the KeyKode information on film, expediting the editorial and post-production processes.	Laboratory
1999 (72nd)	Vivienne Dyer and Chris Woolf, for the design and development of the Rycote Microphone Windshield Modular System. Designed to eliminate physical acoustical rumble and to mask a microphone's high sensitivity to wind and other unwanted noises, the lightweight and rugged Rycote Microphone Windshields accomplish these tasks without altering or impairing the original frequency response of the microphone.	Sound
1999 (72nd)	Leslie Drever, for the design and development of the LightWave microphone windscreens and isolation mounts from LightWave Systems. Designed to eliminate physical acoustical rumble and to cover a microphone's high sensitivity to wind and other unwanted noises, the LightWave Systems line of shock mounts and windscreens accomplish these tasks without altering or impairing the original frequency response of the microphone.	Sound
1999 (72nd)	Richard C. Sehlin, for the concept, and Dr. Mitchell J. Bogdanowicz and Mary L. Schmoeger of the Eastman Kodak Company, for the design and development of the Eastman Lamphouse Modification Filters. The ELM Filters enable a laboratory to achieve additive printer contrast and color reproduction using a subtractive lamphouse.	Lenses and Filters
1999 (72nd)	Hoyt Yeatman, Jr. of Dream Quest Images and John C. Brewer of the Eastman Kodak Company, for the identification and diagnosis leading to the elimination of the "red fringe" artifact in traveling matte composite photography. The elimination of the "red fringe" artifact in traveling matte composite photography obviates expensive additional computerized image processing thus reducing the time involved in producing a seamless and convincing composite shot.	Laboratory
2000 (73rd)	To Leonard Pincus, Ashot Nalbandyan, George Johnson, Thomas Kong, and David Pringle for the design and development of the SoftSun low pressure xenon long-arc light sources, their power supplies and fixtures. With the ability to dim these very high powered lights at essentially constant Kelvin temperature and without flicker, these units produce a bright and even light source for general set lighting. The availability of very high wattage units allows production to extend the hours of work past the time when the crew would otherwise have "lost the light".	Lighting
2000 (73rd)	To Vic Armstrong for the refinement and application to the film industry of the Fan Descender for accurately and safely arresting the descent of stunt persons in high freefalls. Considered a standard of the industry, the Fan Descender provides a means for significantly increasing the safety of very high stunt falls. The system permits falls to be made under controlled deceleration and with a highly predictable stopping point without limitation of camera angles.	Stage Operations
2000 (73rd)	To Philip Greenstreet of Rosco Laboratories for the concept and development of the Roscolight Day/Night Backdrop. This unique photographic scenic backing allows a smooth transition from day to night views with a single backing. The Roscolight backings provide an important new creative tool to filmmakers, saving time, money and stage space.	Stage Operations
2000 (73rd)	To Udo Schauss, Hildegard Ebbesmeier and Karl Lenhardt for the optical design, and Ralf Linn and Norbert Brinker for the mechanical design of the Schneider Super Cinelux lenses for motion picture projection. These projection lenses provide a significant improvement in the quality of the cinema viewing experience.	Lenses and Filters
2000 (73rd)	To Glenn M. Berggren for the concept, Horst Linge for research and development, and Wolfgang Reinecke for the optical design of the ISCO Ultra-Star Plus lenses for motion picture projection. The unique optical design of the Ultra-Star Plus projection lenses achieves unprecedented edge-to-edge uniformity of illumination, combined with a significant increase in screen brightness, thus providing a substantial improvement in the cinema viewing experience.	Lenses and Filters
2000 (73rd)	To Bill Tondreau of Kuper Systems, Alvah J. Miller and Paul Johnson of Lynx Robotics, and David Stump of Visual Effects Rental Services for the conception, design and development of data capture systems that enable superior accuracy, efficiency and economy in the creation of composite imagery. These systems digitally record live action camera and axis data with practically no impact on the live action production process, allowing compositing for visual effects to become faster and more cost-effective.	Systems
2000 (73rd)	To Venkat Krishnamurthy for the creation of the Paraform Software for 3D Digital Form Development. This system streamlines the creation of 3D computer graphics models by allowing artists to convert the data from automatically scanned physical models into a user-specified configuration of patches well suited for use in computer applications.	Special Photographic
2000 (73rd)	To George Borshukov, Kim Libreri and Dan Piponi for the development of a system for image-based rendering allowing choreographed camera movements through computer graphic reconstructed sets. This component of the Manex Visual Effects Virtual Cinematography System provides theatrical-quality virtual settings.	Special Photographic
2000 (73rd)	To John P. Pytlak for the development of the Laboratory Aim Density (LAD) system. The LAD system has become the standard method used by film laboratories and digital film recording facilities for the efficient and uniform control of color and exposure in camera negatives, interpositives and duplicate negatives.	Laboratory
2001 (74th)	To Pete Romano for the design and development of the Remote AquaCam, an underwater camera housing system for use in motion pictures. The Remote AquaCam brings to the industry an underwater camera housing specifically designed for remote and high-speed operation. Its hydro-dynamic shape facilitates ease of operation for surface hand-held filming, and its remote capabilities allow it to film in confined areas or in situations where an operator cannot be near the camera.	Photography
2001 (74th)	To Jordan Klein for his pioneering efforts in the development and application of underwater camera housings for motion pictures. With over 50 years of involvement in the design and development of underwater camera housings, Jordan Klein has had significant influence in the field of underwater photography.	Photography
2001 (74th)	To Bernard Werner and William Gelow for the engineering and design of filtered line arrays and screen spreading compensation as applied to motion picture loudspeaker systems. Employing both tapered line array and filtered line array technologies and unique passive and active filter networks, their work with cinema loudspeakers was both innovative and dedicated specifically to cinema applications.	Sound
2001 (74th)	To Tomlinson Holman for the research and systems integration resulting in the improvement of motion picture loudspeaker systems. For over 20 years Tomlinson Holman has been involved in the research and integration of the constant-directivity, direct radiator bass type of cinema loudspeaker systems.	Sound
2001 (74th)	To Geoff Jackson and Roger Woodburn for their DMS 120S Camera Motor. This well-engineered camera motor features built-in time-lapse programmability and is useful in an unusually wide range of applications, including MOS production filming, high-speed photography, animation and motion control.	Camera
2001 (74th)	To Thomas Major Barron for the overall concept and design; Charles Smith for the structural engineering; and Gordon Seitz for the mechanical engineering of the Bulldog Motion Control Camera Crane. This motion control camera crane represents an unprecedented combination of long reach, high-speed and a novel approach to its transport, which allows a very rapid setup on location.	Camera Cranes
2001 (74th)	To John Anderson, Jim Hourihan, Cary Phillips and Sebastian Marino for the development of the ILM Creature Dynamics System. This system makes hair, clothing, skin, flesh and muscle simulation both directable and integrated within a character animation and rigging environment.	Digital Imaging Technology
2001 (74th)	To Dr. Steve Sullivan and Eric Schafer for the development of the ILM Motion and Structure Recovery System (MARS.) The MARS system provides analysis of camera motion and object motion, and their dimensions. It employs a rich set of user-interface tools and sophisticated algorithms.	Digital Imaging Technology
2001 (74th)	To Carl Ludwig and John Constantine, Jr. for their contributions to CELCO Digital Film Recorder products. CELCO recorder products have had a significant impact on the industry through continual improvements in their technology.	Special Photographic
2001 (74th)	To Bill Spitzak, Paul Van Camp, Jonathan Egstad and Price Pethel for their pioneering effort on the NUKE-2D Compositing Software. The Nuke-2D compositing software allows for the creation of complex interactive digital composites using relatively modest computing hardware.	Digital Imaging Technology
2001 (74th)	To Lance Williams for his pioneering influence in the field of computer-generated animation and effects for motion pictures. The ongoing influence of Lance Williams is exemplified in his three seminal papers "Casting Shadows on Curved Surfaces," "Pyramidal Parametrics" and "View Interpolation for Image Synthesis."	Digital Imaging Technology
2001 (74th)	To Dr. Uwe Sassenberg and Rolf Schneider for the development of "3D Equalizer," an advanced and robust camera and object match-moving system. This dominant commercial tracking system provides "survey-free" tracking, which significantly reduces the need for painstaking, error-prone measurements on sets.	Digital Imaging Technology
2001 (74th)	To Garland Stern for the concept and implementation of the Cel Paint Software System. All current cel painting applications in the motion picture industry can be traced back to the original idea and pioneering implementation of Garland Stern.	Digital Imaging Technology
2001 (74th)	To Mic Rodgers and Matt Sweeney for the concept, design and realization of the "Mic Rig."	Stage Operations
2002 (75th)	To Dick Walsh for the development of the PDI/ DreamWorks Facial Animation System. This effective software simulation system is used to create and control natural, expressive, highly nuanced facial animation on a wide range of computer-generated characters.	Digital Imaging Technology
2002 (75th)	To Thomas Driemeyer and to the Team of Mathematicians, Physicists and Software Engineers of Mental Images for their contributions to the Mental Ray rendering software for motion pictures. Mental Ray is a highly programmable computer-graphics renderer incorporating ray tracing and global illumination to realistically simulate the behavior of light in computer-generated imagery.	Digital Imaging Technology
2002 (75th)	To Eric Daniels, George Katanics, Tasso Lappas and Chris Springfield for the development of the Deep Canvas rendering software. The Deep Canvas software program captures the original brush strokes of the traditional background artist to render elements in three dimensions for animated films.	Digital Imaging Technology
2002 (75th)	To Jim Songer for his contributions to the technical development of video-assist in the motion picture industry. The work of Jim Songer from 1968 through 1973 led directly to the more widespread acceptance of video-assist in the motion picture industry.	Systems
2002 (75th)	To Pierre Chabert of Airstar for the introduction of balloons with internal light sources to provide set lighting for the motion picture industry. These helium-filled balloons with internal arrangements for tungsten halogen and HMI light sources are usable indoors or out, quick to set up, require essentially no rigging and provide a soft light that can cover a very large area.	Lighting
2002 (75th)	To Rawdon Hayne and Robert W. Jeffs of Leelium Tubelite for their contributions to the development of internally lit balloons for motion picture lighting.	Lighting
