= Joseph Robbins =

Joseph Robbins may refer to:

- Joseph E. Robbins (1901–1989), American film technician
- Joe Robbins (footballer), English footballer
- Joseph Robbins (priest), Anglican priest in Ireland
