= Miyagishima =

Miyagishima kamon (family crest) featuring an ivy (蔦) leaf

Miyagishima is a Japanese surname.

== Origin ==
During Japan's Bunji era (1185 to 1190 CE), a samurai named Minamoto Yoshikage ventured to the Miho area of Japan. At the Miho Shrine, Yoshikage became a Shinto priest and changed his name to Miyagishima Shichirodayu. For several hundred years thereafter, his descendants worked at the Miho Shrine. In successive years, his family grew and his offspring established separate families and became farmers. Thus, a small farming community called "Miyagata" was established (Miyagata means the residence of the Shinto priest and his family).

In 1871, after the Meiji Restoration, Miyagata Buraku (hamlet) and Miho Jinja (shrine) were annexed into Miho Mura (village). The majority of the Miyagata residents had the surname Miyagishima. In 1924, Miho and six other towns merged to form Shimizu City, in turn merging with Shizuoka City, Shizuoka prefecture in 2003.

== People with the surname ==
- Ken Miyagishima (born 1963), American mayor
- Takuo Miyagishima (died 2011), American engineer
- Edward Miyagishima (born 1970), White House Staffer
