= Knoth =

Knoth is a surname of German origin. Notable people with the surname include:

- Cinthia Knoth (born 1962), Brazilian sailor
- Fred Knoth (1907–1990), American special effects artist
- Petr Knoth (born 1983), Czech ice dancer
- Dale Knoth (born 1973), American Lighting Designer for Theater and Television

== See also ==
- Knothe
