= Lee International =

English lighting business

Lee Electric (Lighting) Ltd was incorporated as a business in 1961 by John and Benny Lee, two film lighting electricians. Lee Electric was primarily involved in the rental of lighting equipment for commercial and documentary productions, as all principal film and television studios were at the time equipped with their own lighting equipment.

== History ==
=== Early history ===
Lee Electric began renting lighting equipment. Although the lighting rental market grew throughout the 1960s, largely due to the impact of commercial television, the market was dominated by a single manufacturer of lighting equipment, Mole-Richardson (England) Ltd, which was also the largest rental house. Lee Electric aggressively increased its inventory and bought from competitors in financial trouble.

In 1967, Lee Electric acquired a major camera filter company, which was renamed Lee Filters.

BBC2 began to transmit in colour in 1967, with BBC1 and ITV following in 1969. The introduction of colour broadcasts entailed a substantial increase in the amount of lighting needed in studios as well as on location. With a major increase in the amount of equipment available to it as a result of purchasing Ianiro equipment, Lee Electric was able to tender for and to win a five-year contract with the BBC for the supply of lighting equipment for U.K. television outside broadcasts. The contract, which was retained by Lee Electric for many more years put the company into the limelight and necessitated further substantial investment in equipment and established Lee Electric's leading reputation and position in the lighting rental market. The contract was subsequently extended to 1990.

In 1968, Lee Electric purchased a 3-acre (12,000 m^{2}) site in North Kensington, which was converted to provide premises for the lighting equipment rental business and a three-stage film studio. Lee Electric was able to compete with the major U.K. studios because it offered its stages on a 'four wall' basis, that is without the requirement to use the studio's labour and equipment. Significant feature films made at the Kensington studios included A Touch of Class (1973) and The Who rock opera, Tommy (1975). In the same year Lee Electric acquired Telefilm Lighting Services Ltd, a competitor, thereby further increasing the quantity of equipment that Lee Electric could provide and expanding its range of marketing contracts.

To enhance the services offered to the television companies, Lee Scaffolding Ltd was formed in 1969 to hire scaffolding for rigging lighting equipment for television outside broadcasts. Stagemate Ltd was also established to provide scaffolding to film production companies.

Lee Electric (Northern) Ltd was formed in 1972, primarily to service the lighting requirements of the BBC in the North of U.K. It then became a major rental house in its own right.

In 1974, Lee Enterprises Ltd was formed to act as a bulk buyer of consumable items, principally for the rest of the Lee Group but also as a wholesaler to third parties.

In 1975, the company acquired the UK arm of Mole-Richardson. They also acquired Joe Dunton Cameras Ltd, which provided a camera rental service to the film industry.

In 1977, Wembley Studios became part of the Lee group being renamed Lee International Film Studios and Lee Electric moved there. Over the two year following the studios acquisition, Lee Electric completely refurbished and refitted these studios for film and television productions and commercials.

By 1979, Lee Electric had established working relationships with a number of U.S. film production companies whose lighting requirements outside of the U.S.A. were serviced by Lee Electric and who used Wembley Studios. In that year Lee Electric took the strategic step of opening a lighting rental house in New York City. The establishment of Lee Lighting America was coupled with the acquisition of Belden, a New York-based distributor and selling agent for film and television equipment, which had been the exclusive U.S. distributor for Lee Filters since 1976. In January, 1986 a second rental house was opened in Los Angeles. In August 1984, Lee Electric acquired the Shepperton Film Studios complex.

In October 1984, a new holding Company, Media Technology International PLC, was formed to acquire Lee Filters and Joe Dunton Cameras and admission was obtained to the Unlisted Securities Market on the London Stock Exchange. At that time, Lee Electric and John and Benny Lee owned in aggregate 59.3 per cent. of MTI's issued share capital. It was considered that the allied but self-contained activities of Lee Filters and Joe Dunton Cameras could be more successfully developed under its own management and with direct access to the capital markets. In June, 1984, Joe Dunton Cameras had established a subsidiary in the U.S.A.

Lee International was formed in May 1985 to become the holding company for the Lee Group.

=== Acquisition of Colortran ===
In June 1985, Lee Electric acquired Colortran, a U.S. manufacturer of lighting products, with operations in Burbank, California and with a U.K. branch in Thetford, Norfolk. Its products included advanced computerised dimming control systems and specialist lights for theatres and architectural applications. Through this acquisition the Lee Group secured an international network of distributors and agents.

In a deal reported to be worth around £3.7 million, Lee paid £850,000 in cash and the rest was to service Colortran's existing debt finance. Lee bought 85 percent of Colortran Holdings Inc. from Forward Technology Industries Inc. whilst Ken Boyda, Colortran's CEO, retained a 15 percent stake. Lee later acquired this outstanding 15 percent in December 1985 in exchange for shares. Lee also contracted through Colortran to buy 2.3-acre (9,300 m^{2}) of land with office and factory buildings at Thetford for £460,000 cash.

The manufacturing business was renamed Lee Colortran and saw the factory at Thetford refurbished whilst Lee International's site at Kearsley, Bolton became the northern England manufacturing base for Lee Colortran where the factory also undertook research and development of new electronic lighting control equipment. In North America, office space, factory and warehousing, split between two sites in Burbank, California was leased.

In November 1985, MTI acquired Mitchell Camera Corporation, which was based in Los Angeles and was one of the oldest manufacturers of film cameras. The acquisition reduced the Lee Group's interest in MTI to 53.9%, which was further reduced to 29.9 per cent. As part of the reorganisation that took place prior to the Offer for Sale.

=== Acquisition of Humphries Holdings PLC and public listing ===
In November 1985, Lee International made a recommended cash offer for a listed company, Humphries Holdings PLC, which rents lighting equipment in Europe, manufactures low voltage lighting, operates music recording studios and duplicated video tapes. The offer was declared unconditional on 5 December 1985 at which date it had been accepted in respect of shares representing 94.2% of the issued share capital. The acquisition of Humphries Holding included Mole-Richardson French, Spanish and Austrian companies.

Lee announced in October 1985 that it had agreed a cash offer to acquire rental and services group Humphries Holdings PLC, valuing it at £2.5 million. The offer of 33.5 pence per ordinary share was accepted by majority shareholder BET plc, holding 75% of Humphries issued share capital. Lee's offer was a 20 per cent premium over Humphries recent mid market share price of 28 pence. Humphries made an attributable loss of £2.46 million to the year ending March 1985 on turnover of £14.22 million.

Operating under the Mole-Richardson name Humphries ran two European film and television lighting rental houses located in France and Spain. The French subsidiary also manufactured low voltage lighting for architectural and display purposes, many of its low voltage lights being installed in shops; hotels; banks and numerous other buildings. Mole-Richardson had a showroom in Whitfield Street London selling their low voltage lights. Humphries had recently closed and sold off its film laboratory interests however it retained a video duplication operation based in London. Humphries also ran CTS Recording Studios a sound and music recording studio based in Wembley.

Two consequences of the Humphries takeover were firstly to delay the imminent public flotation of Lee International PLC, allowing Lee time to prepare and publish its offer document to include the Humphries acquisition figures. Secondly the acquisition of Humphries brought about a significant change in the makeup of the Lee International board of directors, bringing in John Davey and Colin Wills in the non-executive positions of chairman and director respectively. The appointment of these two senior executives to board of Lee, who both had a long track record of working in executive roles for quoted companies, would significantly enhance the Lee boardroom.

Lee's finance director David Mindel was quoted in the 25 October 1985, issue of Broadcast periodical commenting on the acquisition. "We had to choose between buying Humphries Holdings when the opportunity occurred or postponing our flotation plans, really, there was no choice, Humphries is too good an opportunity to pass up. Its figures will be included in Lee results when we go public next spring."

In April 1986, Lee International sought flotation on the London Stock Exchange with an offer price of £1.80 which valued Lee's shares at £85 million. At the time, it claimed to be the world's biggest renter of lighting and ancillary equipment to the film and television industry. It was also Britain's largest operator of film studios.

In July 1986, Lee International bought Munich-based, German lighting manufacturer, Kobold Licht Fritz Consten

It also acquired Derek Meddings' special effects company, Meddings Magic Camera Company, in 1986. In April 1987, it further expanded its special effects facility by acquiring Moore & Griffin.

In June 1987, it acquired Scottish-based film and television services group, Andrew Ritchie & Sons, for £1.5 million.

=== Acquisition of Panavision ===
Panavision's president John Farrand met the Lee brothers at a convention of the National Association of Broadcasters in 1987 and expressed a desire for Panavision to get into the lighting business.

On 3 September 1987, Lee International PLC announced that it had made an offer of $100 million (£61 million) for Panavision, the manufacturer and renter of motion picture cameras and lenses.

At that time it was estimated Panavision had a stock of some 700 movie cameras only available for rental from Panavision offices or through agents. Panavision estimated that its cameras were used on 35% of worldwide feature film production. In 1986 it had a turnover of $29.07 million and made a pre–tax profit of $2.5 million.

Simultaneously, Lee's management were organising a buyout of Lee International PLC, worth £198 million to take the company private just 18 months after its flotation, after the London Stock Exchange voiced concern about Panavision's short independent life, having only recently been bought by its management in 1985 from Warner Communications, and its comparable size to Lee International, the purchase of the camera company would represent around 30 per cent of the two names joining forces, leading to overgearing and dilution of earnings.

Westward Communications was formed by Lee's directors who offered £3.60 a share in cash or one ordinary share for every Lee share held.

Lee International PLC had 55,108,720 ordinary shares in issue as stated in their 1987 Annual Report, of this figure John Lee owned 14,102,892 and his brother Benny slightly more with 14,137,892. Lee's president and financial director, David J Mindel owned 1,374,797 shares with other senior management holding a total of 824,318 Lee shares. This gave Lee's management control over 30,438,901, just over 55% of the voting shares in the company.

Lee's purchase of Panavision looked thwarted from the very beginning. Arguments were made that Lee was paying twice over for Panavision. Westward's purchase of both Lee and Panavision would cost a staggering $340 million, this was almost twice the estimated assets of the combined group. Finance for the two deals was provided by Citicorp Industrial Credit and another $10 million from parties connected with Lee's management. Westward intended to seek a US listing for its shares within 18 months of the deal and a return to the London market would be considered too. It was estimated at the time that Westward would have a market value in the region of £400 million.

Lee was purchasing Panavision from Frederick W "Ted" Field's Interscope Communications Inc. The purchase price of $100 million cash with Lee assuming Panavision's $47 million debt was substantially higher than the $52.5 million Field paid Warner Communications for the company back in 1984.

Lee's takeover of Panavision was hit by two significant events that impacted heavily on their acquisition. Firstly, within eight weeks of the Panavision purchase world stock markets suffered what is now known as Black Monday, where stock markets crashed on 19 October 1987, throughout the world. The following global financial crisis put paid to plans for Westward Communications seeking a public listing on the New York Stock Exchange within 18 months of the deal. Secondly, 1988 saw the Writers Guild of America on strike for close on 22 weeks, from 7 March through 7 August. The strike affected the making of many American television series and to a lesser extent Hollywood movie production. Panavision's revenue experienced a major downturn during this time, a report in the Los Angeles Times in August 1988 estimated Panavision sales had fallen 20% that year primarily due to the five-month writers strike.

== Financials ==
1981-1987 Geographical Analysis

Year ended 31 May	Turnover	Pre tax profit	United Kingdom	Europe	United States	Rest of World
1981	£10,390,000	£926,000	-	-	-	-
1982	£10,871,000	£1,023,000	-	-	-	-
1983	£13,929,000	£1,321,000	£12,266,000	-	£1,504,000	£159,000
1984	£15,814,000	£2,295,000	£13,694,000	-	£2,051,000	£69,000
1985	£23,399,000	£4,989,000	£18,690,000	£413,000	£3,335,000	£961,000
1986	£38,307,000	£6,992,000	£22,552,000	£5,313,000	£9,307,000	£1,735,000
1987	£55,254,000	£9,503,000	£25,943,000	£12,984,000	£11,526,000	£4,801,000

Turnover Profit

1985 profit include £450,000 exceptional item largely due from an insurance claim for rental assets destroyed in a fire at Pinewood Studios, over their book value.

1981-1985 Class of Business Analysis

Year ended 31 May	Rental & Manufacturing	Rental & Manufacturing	Studio Hire	Studio Hire	United States	United States
1981	£8,978,000	£1,084,000	£577,000	£81,000	£835,000	£25,000
1982	£9,075,000	£1,179,000	£662,000	£149,000	£1,134,000	£103,000
1983	£11,375,000	£1,223,000	£823,000	£48,000	£1,731,000	£213,000
1984	£12,443,000	£1,734,000	£1,021,000	£92,000	£2,350,000	£296,000
1985	£16,546,000	£3,121,000	£3,404,000	£922,000	£3,449,000	£542,000

Turnover Profit Loss

1986-1987 Class of Business Analysis

Year ended 31 May	Equipment Rental	Equipment Rental	Manufacturing	Manufacturing	Studio Hire	Studio Hire	Associated Company	Associated Company
1986	£18,019,000	£4,115,000	£16,952,000	£1,407,000	£3,936,000	£819,000	-	£651,000
1987	£20,223,000	£4,746,000	£28,836,000	£3,730,000	£6,195,000	£684,000	-	£343,000

Turnover Profit

Associated company figures are for Lee's investment income from Media Technology International PLC

== Financial Crisis ==
By early 1988, Lee International, with its heavy debt burden, had hit serious financial difficulties. It was in default on the $340 million loan, having insufficient cash to the meet interest payments. In August, 1988 a spokesman for Citicorp, which led a syndicate of 17 international banks to fund both Lee's purchase of Panavision and buyout vehicle Westward Communications Ltd, announced that the Lee group of companies was indeed in crisis.

Further news emerged around this time that brothers John and Benny Lee, who founded the company in the early 1960s, had resigned as directors of the group's parent company even though they remained majority shareholders.

Within weeks of these developments US based Warburg Pincus Capital LP, a private equity company, was approached by Citicorp to engage in restructuring Lee's debt. At the same time, the fraud squad raided the company's offices removing paperwork relating to their relationship with the BBC. The relationship had previously been investigated by the Office of Fair Trading, although no action had been taken.

Warburg stepped in, investing $60 million in a new company Lee Panavision International Inc, which assumed Westward's $340 million debt. Under the deal, Lee Panavision International would acquire all Lee Group assets except for the UK lighting operation Lee Lighting Ltd. However, Lee Panavision International had an option to purchase Lee Lighting exercisable at any time until 17 December 1990, furthermore Lee Panavision entered into a management agreement of Lee Lighting.

Trilion acquired Lee International studios for £5.25 million.

In December 1988, Warburg Pincus appointed William C Scott as chairman, president and CEO of Lee Panavision International Inc. Scott finally succeeded in taking the Panavision Inc. public in 1996 and remained with Lee Panavision until his resignation in January 1999.
