= Paul Lerpae =

- Born: Paul Karl Lerpae; April 7, 1900; Mexico City, Distrito Federal, Mexico
- Died: October 5, 1989 (aged 89); Palm Springs, California, USA
- Occupation: Special Effects Artist
- Years active: 1936-1968

Paul Lerpae (April 7, 1900 – October 5, 1989) was a Mexican-born American special effects artist who was nominated during the 20th Academy Awards for the film Unconquered in the category of Best Special Effects. His nomination was shared with George Dutton, Farciot Edouart, Devereux Jennings, Gordon Jennings and W. Wallace Kelley.

He worked on over 120 films during his long career.
