= Mark Schneider =

Mark Schneider may refer to:

- Mark Schneider (politician), Democratic politician who served in the Ohio House of Representatives from 2009 to 2011
- Mark Schneider (media executive), British media executive, co-founder of GB News
- Mark L. Schneider (born 1941), director of the Peace Corps, 1999–2001
- Ulf Mark Schneider (born 1965), businessman
- Mark Robert Schneider, American historian and author

== See also ==
- Marc Schneider (disambiguation)
