= Fred Albin =

American sound engineer

- Born: December 11, 1903
- Died: May 3, 1968 (aged 64)
- Occupation: Sound engineer
- Years active: 1934-1960

Fred Albin (December 11, 1903 – May 3, 1968) was an American sound engineer. He was nominated for an Oscar for Best Special Effects on the film Gone with the Wind at the 12th Academy Awards. He also won the Academy Award for Technical Achievement that year along with Thomas T. Moulton and the Sound Department of the Samuel Goldwyn Studio for the origination and application of the Delta db test for sound recording in motion pictures.
