= Union Pacific (film) =

1939 film by Cecil B. DeMille

- Theatrical film poster
- Directed by: Cecil B. DeMille
- Written by: Walter DeLeon; Jack Cunningham; C. Gardner Sullivan
- Based on: Trouble Shooter (1936 novel) by Ernest Haycox
- Produced by: Cecil B. DeMille
- Starring: Barbara Stanwyck; Joel McCrea; Akim Tamiroff; Robert Preston; Lynne Overman; Brian Donlevy
- Cinematography: Victor Milner
- Edited by: Anne Bauchens
- Music by: Sigmund Krumgold; John Leipold; Gerard Carbonara (uncredited); Leo Shuken (uncredited); Victor Young (uncredited)
- Distributed by: Paramount Pictures
- Release date: May 5, 1939
- Running time: 135 minutes
- Country: United States
- Language: English

Union Pacific is a 1939 American Western drama directed by Cecil B. DeMille and starring Barbara Stanwyck, Joel McCrea and Robert Preston. Based on the 1936 novel Trouble Shooter by Western fiction author Ernest Haycox, the film is about the building of the Union Pacific Railroad across the American West. Haycox based his novel upon the experiences of civil engineer Charles H. Sharman, who worked on the railroad from its start in Omaha, Nebraska in 1866 until the golden spike ceremony on May 10, 1869 to commemorate the joining of the Central Pacific and Union Pacific railroads at Promontory Summit, Utah Territory. The film recreates the event using the same 1869 golden spike, on loan from Stanford University.

== Plot ==
The 1862 Pacific Railroad Act signed by President Abraham Lincoln authorizes pushing the Union Pacific Railroad westward across the wilderness toward California. Asa Barrows has a stake in the Central Pacific Railroad and hopes to profit from delaying the completion of the Union Pacific. Gambler Sid Campbeau and his partner Dick Allen help Barrows sabotage the endeavor.

Jeff Butler is hired to troubleshoot construction. He fought in the war with Allen and is happy to reunite with him. Both men have their eye on Mollie Monahan, the daughter of a railroad engineer.

Barrows agrees to finance the payroll of the Union Pacific but instructs Campbeau to hijack the money and return most of it to him. Butler interrupts the heist with his men. Allen rides off with the payroll and hides it at Mollie's. Butler finds Allen at Mollie's and looks for the payroll. Allen threatens to kill him.

Mollie agrees to marry Allen only if he will return the payroll. They pretend they found it on the tracks. Butler still has to find the payroll thieves, who will be hanged when they are caught.

Allen sneaks onto Mollie's car on the train as it moves down the line. The train is ambushed by Native Americans who collapse a water tower onto the tracks and destroy the locomotive. As they ransack the train, Mollie and Allen are trapped. Butler makes his way to their car and the trio telegraphs for help. When they run out of ammunition, Butler prepares to kill Mollie to prevent her capture. The cavalry arrives on another train. Butler allows Allen to escape because of their friendship.

Railroad construction halts as winter weather delays plans to build a mountain tunnel. A temporary track is built around the mountain. The first track collapses, killing Mollie's father. The second track holds and construction continues.

The completion of the railroad is celebrated by driving a golden spike to join the two lines that now span the continent. Allen is at the ceremony and reunites with Mollie. Campbeau is also there, waiting to kill Butler. Allen intervenes. Campbeau kills Allen before he is shot by Butler's friends.

== Cast ==
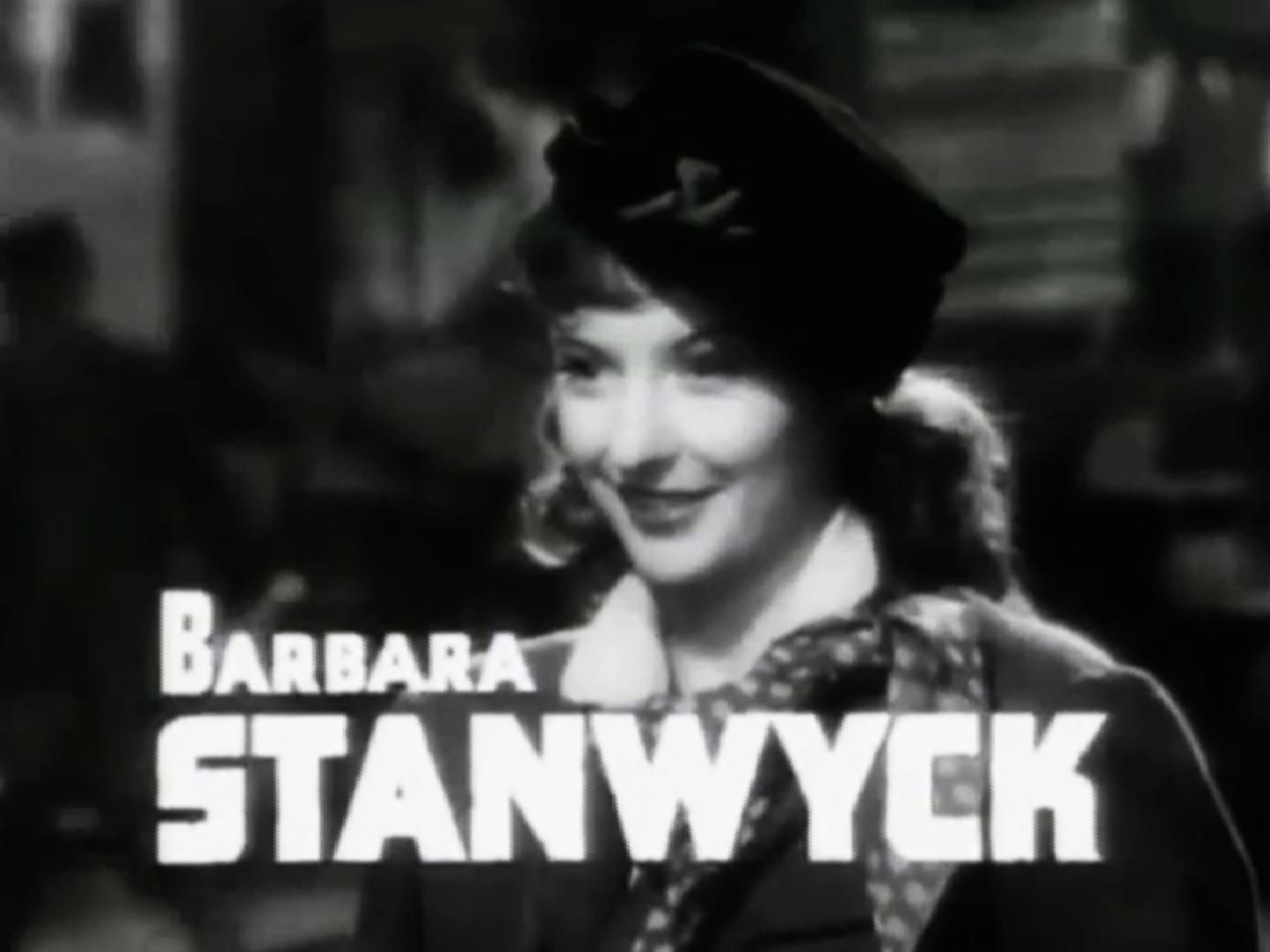
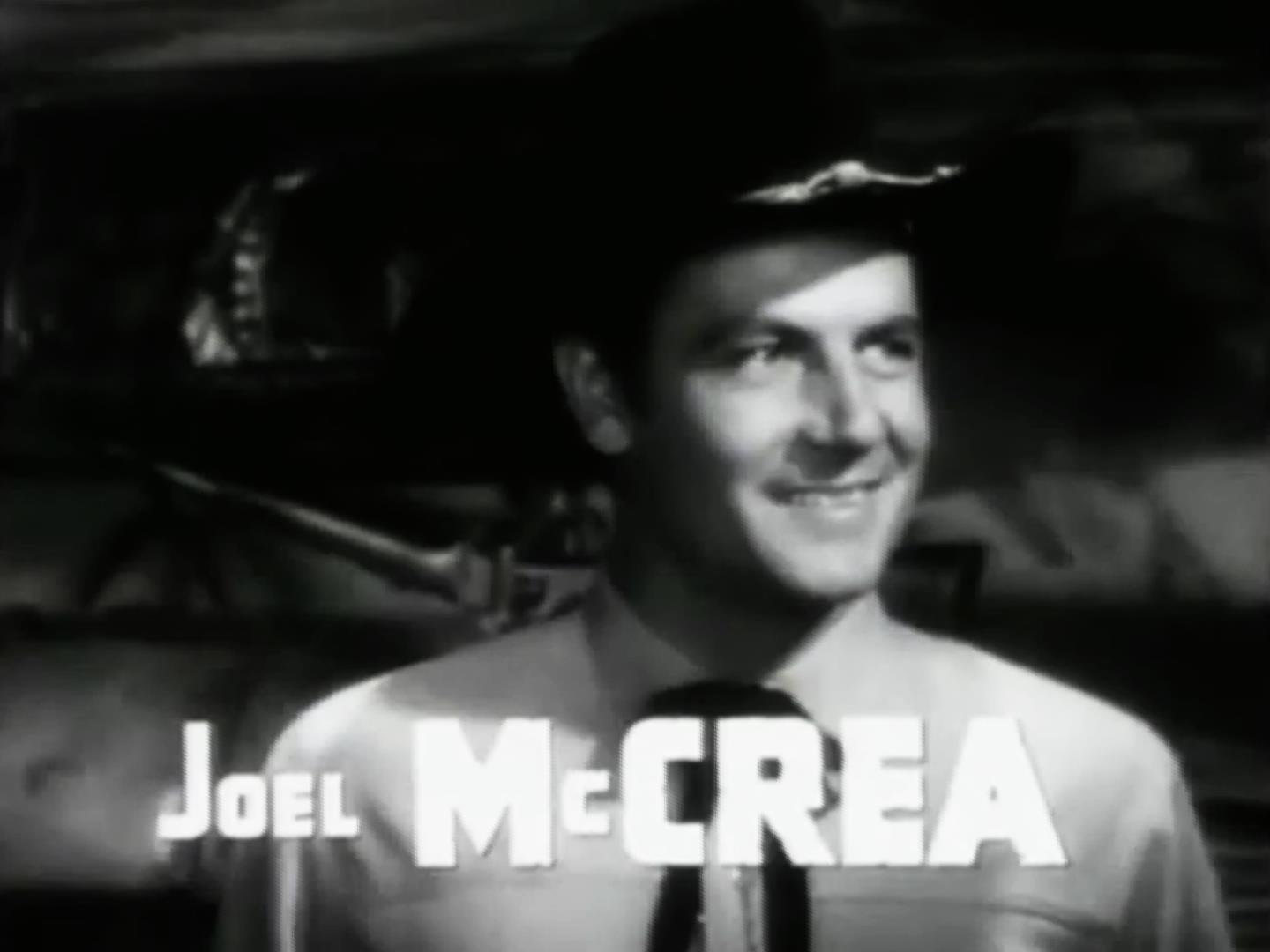
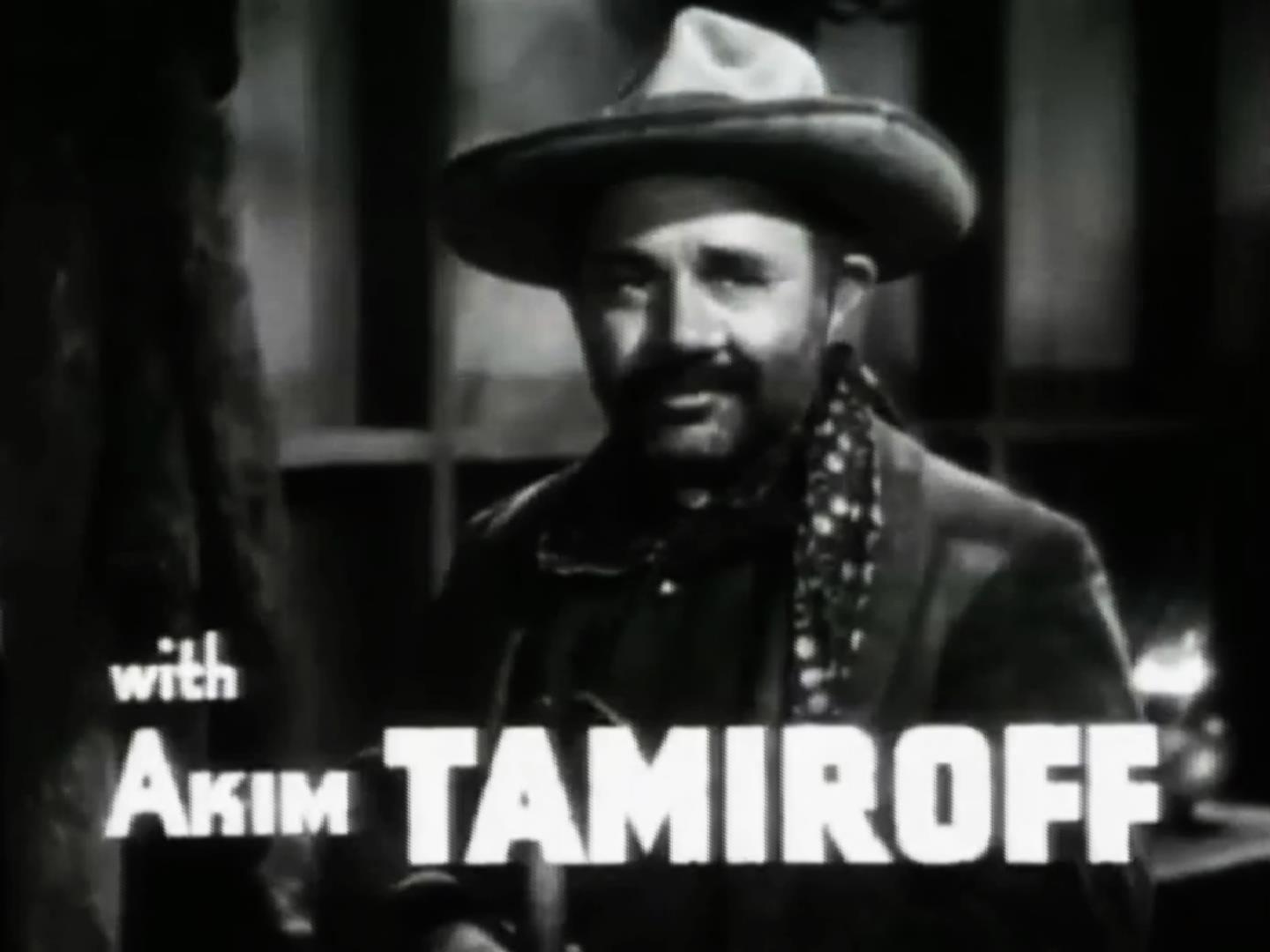
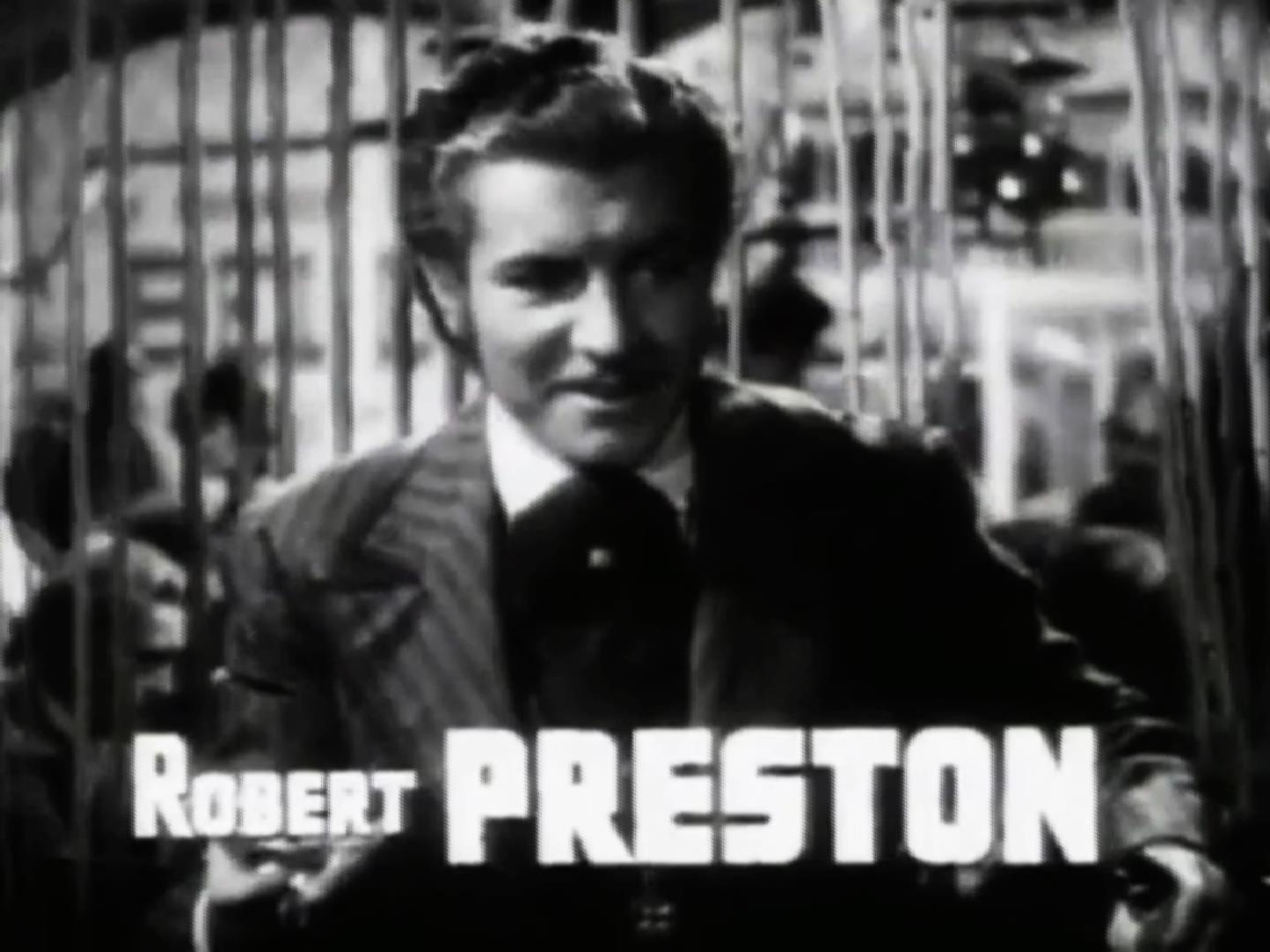
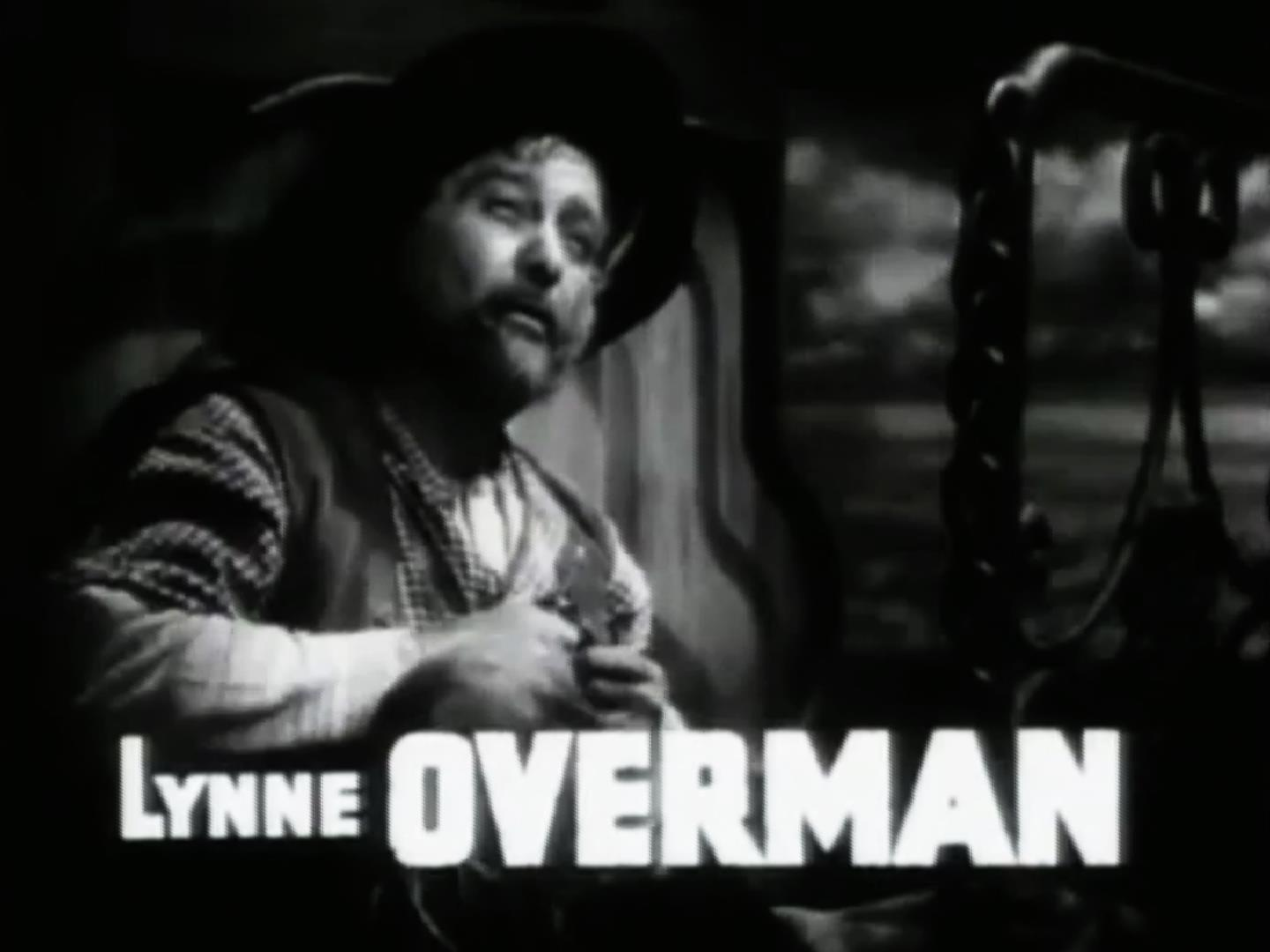
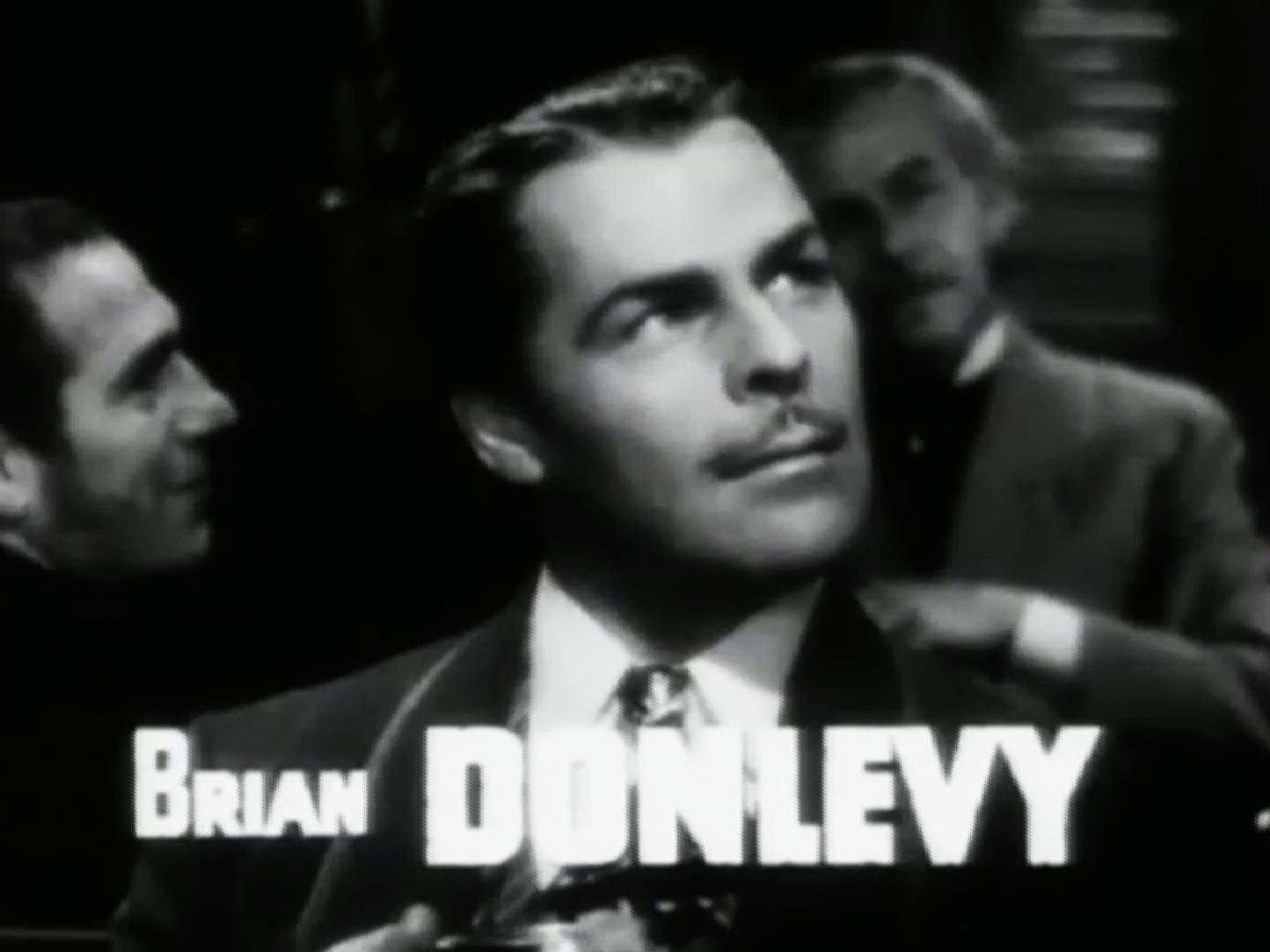
Screenshots from the film trailer, depicting its main characters
- Barbara Stanwyck as Mollie Monahan
- Joel McCrea as Captain Jeff Butler
- Akim Tamiroff as Fiesta
- Robert Preston as Dick Allen
- Lynne Overman as Leach Overmile
- Brian Donlevy as Sid Campeau
- Robert Barrat as Duke Ring (Campeau henchman)
- Anthony Quinn as Jack Cordray (Campeau henchman)
- Stanley Ridges as General Casement
- Henry Kolker as Asa M. Barrows (banker)
- Francis McDonald as General Grenville M. Dodge
- Willard Robertson as Oakes Ames
- Harold Goodwin as E.E. Calvin (telegrapher)
- Evelyn Keyes as Mrs. Calvin
- Richard Lane as Sam Reed
- Emory Parnell as Foreman

== Production ==
Union Pacific is a celebration of American industry. DeMille recognized that the time was right for "chauvinistic fairy tales". The film is essentially a remake of John Ford's The Iron Horse. DeMille even copies several of Ford's shots, especially during the attack on the supply train.

A prostate issue caused DeMille's absence from the shoot for several weeks during the location shooting. Studio records indicate that DeMille collapsed from the strain of directing three units simultaneously. While DeMille was incapacitated, the film was directed by Arthur Rosson and James Hogan. When DeMille returned, he directed from a stretcher.

Iron Eyes Cody was a trainer for the production. He taught Akim Tamiroff how to use his bullwhip and the extras how to shoot bows and arrows.

Parts of the film were shot in Iron Springs, Utah.

The golden spike used at the ceremony to mark the end of the construction was the same spike used in the May 10, 1869 event, on loan from Stanford University.

One of the noteworthy scenes in the film depicts Indians attacking the train carrying Jeff Butler, Dick Allen, and Mollie Monahan, inspired by a real-life incident near Plum Creek, Nebraska, during which the Indians fell a nearby water tower on to the locomotive, derailing the train, with the three main characters hiding within the wreckage as the Indians proceed to loot the train. For this scene, Paramount hired 100 Navajo Indian extras and rented many pinto horses. Cowboys were hired to round up the horses as they would scatter and sometimes stampede because of the noise and confusion of the production. For the wrecked train, the Virginia and Truckee Reno locomotive was to be laid on its side against an embankment. Despite precautionary measures, the locomotive suffered damage to its cab, running board, boiler jacketing, and pipework during the process of placing it on its side, and further as it was re-railed after filming concluded. Paramount paid nearly $5000 to repair the damage incurred while filming the scene.

To operate the number of trains required by the production, Paramount secured a regulation railroad operating license from the Interstate Commerce Commission.

== Release ==
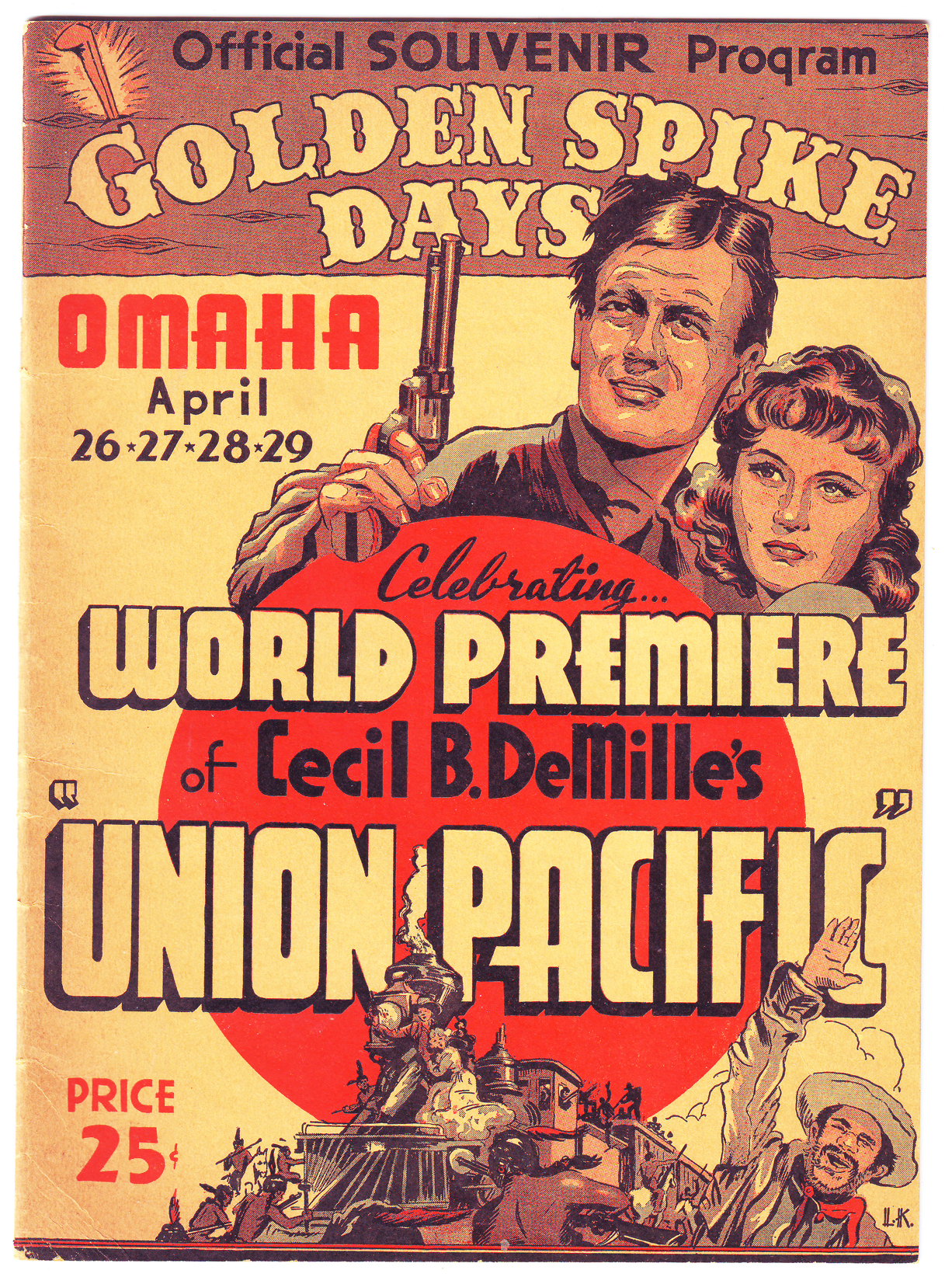
Official program of the Union Pacific world premiere

The film's world premiere took place simultaneously at three different theaters (the Omaha, Orpheum and Paramount) in Omaha, Nebraska, on April 28, 1939, just three weeks before the 70th anniversary of the driving of the golden spike that joined the rails of the Union Pacific and the Central Pacific Railroads at Promontory Summit, Utah Territory on May 10, 1869. The premiere was the centerpiece of a four-day event that drew 250,000 people to the city, temporarily doubling its population and requiring the National Guard to help maintain order.

A special train transported DeMille, Stanwyck and McCrea from Hollywood to Omaha. The trip took three days and made stops along the way, drawing large crowds. President Franklin Roosevelt inaugurated the overall celebration by pressing a telegraph key at the White House that opened the civic auditorium. An advertisement stated that the premiere, which involved parades, radio broadcasts and a banquet, was the largest in motion-picture history. An antique train continued on a 15-day coast-to-coast promotional tour, stopping at 30 cities around the country.

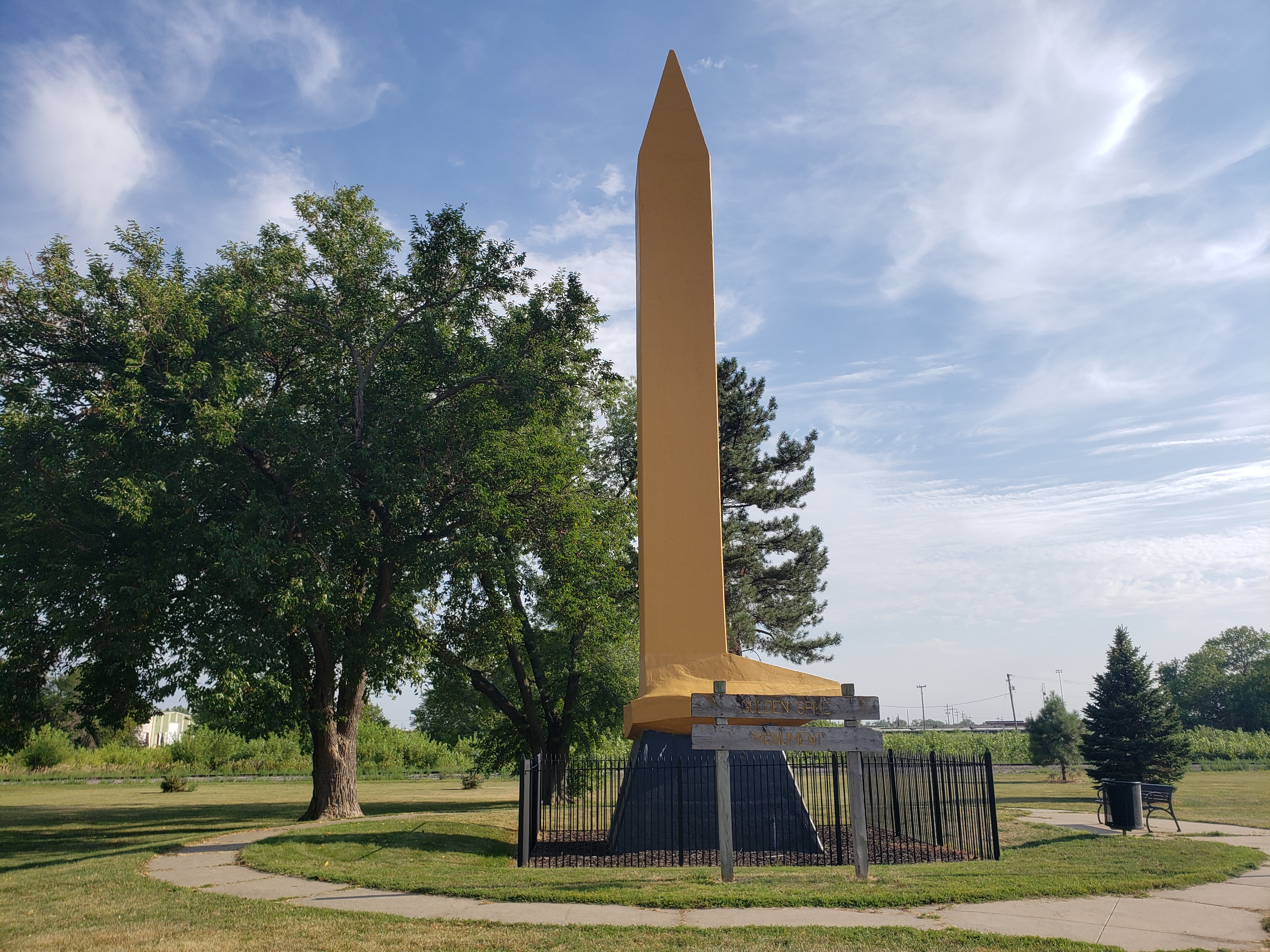
Golden Spike Monument in Council Bluffs, Iowa.

Celebrations also occurred on the other side of the Missouri River in Council Bluffs, Iowa. In commemoration of both the film's release and the 70th anniversary of the completion of the Transcontinental Railroad, a 59 foot tall Golden Spike Monument at milepost 0.0 of the eastern terminus of the Union Pacific Railroad was constructed. The monument was completed on April 26, 1939, and remains standing today.

== Reception ==
Union Pacific was so successful that Paramount gave DeMille carte blanche for his future productions.

Union Pacific was released two months after John Ford's Stagecoach in 1939. The two films helped the Western genre mature beyond Lone Ranger serials and singing cowboy B movies.

== Awards ==
The film was scheduled for the first-ever the Cannes Film Festival in 1939. The invasion of Poland canceled the festival. At the 2002 festival, Union Pacific was shown alongside other films on the original lineup: Goodbye, Mr. Chips, La Piste du Nord, Lenin in 1918, The Four Feathers, The Wizard of Oz, and Boefje. A special jury awarded it the Palme d'Or.

The film was nominated for an Academy Award for Best Special Effects (Farciot Edouart, Gordon Jennings and Loren L. Ryder) at the 12th Academy Awards.

== Home media ==
Union Pacific, along with The Sign of the Cross, Four Frightened People, Cleopatra and The Crusades, was released on DVD in 2006 by Universal Studios as part of the Cecil B. DeMille Collection. It was later released separately, as well as on DVD in France and Germany. In 2017, it was released on Blu-ray in Germany by Koch Media with a high-definition transfer of the 107-minute dubbed and edited 1939 German theatrical version.
