= William Rudolph =

American film technician

William Rudolph (died 27 May 1975) was an American film technician, who received an Academy Award for Technical Achievement.

== Life ==
Rudolph worked as a film technician for Paramount Pictures. At the 12th Academy Awards he received an Academy Award for Technical Achievement together with Farciot Edouart and Joseph E. Robbins for "the design and construction of a quiet portable treadmill".

Rudolph began his career in the film industry as a camera operator and worked his way up to becoming a skilled cinematographer. He was highly respected for his technical expertise and creativity, which were evident in the films he worked on.

In 1948, Rudolph was honored with an Academy Award for Technical Achievement for his innovative work in developing a new process of color film printing. His contribution allowed for more vibrant and accurate color reproduction in films, which greatly enhanced the visual impact of movies.

Throughout his career, Rudolph worked on numerous film productions, including both feature films and documentaries. His work has been praised for its technical excellence and artistic merit, earning him the respect and admiration of his peers in the film industry.

Rudolph died on May 27, 1975, leaving behind a legacy of technical innovation and artistic excellence that continues to inspire filmmakers today.

== Award ==
- 12th Academy Awards: Academy Award for Technical Achievement
