= I Wanted Wings =

1941 film by Mitchell Leisen

- Theatrical poster
- Directed by: Mitchell Leisen
- Screenplay by: Sig Herzig; Beirne Lay Jr. Richard Maibaum
- Story by: Eleanore Griffin; Frank Wead
- Based on: I Wanted Wings; 1937 book by Lt. Beirne Lay Jr.
- Produced by: Arthur Hornblow Jr.
- Starring: Ray Milland; William Holden; Veronica Lake
- Cinematography: Leo Tover
- Edited by: Hugh Bennett
- Music by: Victor Young
- Production company: Paramount Pictures
- Distributed by: Paramount Pictures
- Release date: March 26, 1941
- Running time: 135 minutes
- Country: United States
- Language: English
- Budget: $1,262,454.87 or $1,050,000

I Wanted Wings is a 1941 American drama film directed by Mitchell Leisen and based on the 1937 memoir of the same name by Lt. Beirne Lay Jr. The film stars Ray Milland and William Holden. The supporting cast includes Wayne Morris, Brian Donlevy, Constance Moore and Veronica Lake. I Wanted Wings features Lake's first major film role. Her career took off shortly thereafter; the same year, she starred in Sullivan's Travels. Lake would become one of the most popular and successful actresses of the early 1940s.

== Plot ==
It is 1940, prior to the American entry into World War II. After a simulated air raid against Los Angeles involving eighteen U.S. Army Air Corps Boeing B-17 Flying Fortress bombers, one of them goes down in the desert on its way back to base. Mysteriously, the dead body of a woman is found in the wreck. The pilot, Second Lieutenant Jefferson Young III, is accused of having an unauthorized civilian passenger on board and charged accordingly for disobeying orders. Before the court martial renders a verdict, they review Jeff's military background and history.

The son of a wealthy Long Island businessman, Jeff joins the United States Army Air Corps. At basic training in Texas, he meets former football standout Tom Cassidy and Al Ludlow, a mechanic. Jeff and Al become close friends and support each other through training.

Jeff meets singer Sally Vaughn, unaware that she used to be Al's sweetheart. Jeff, however, is already in love with photographer Carolyn Bartlett. When a pilot (Jimmy Masters) crashes while avoiding Tom, Jeff and Al are first responders to the burning airplane, but Jeff does nothing while Al rescues Masters. Afterward, Jeff is so ashamed of himself, he goes AWOL, gets drunk and goes to see Sally. He offers to take her to Mexico, but Al threatens to expose her past in order to make her persuade Jeff to go back to the base. Afterward, Jeff proposes to Carolyn; she accepts.

During training at another airfield, the three friends fly dangerously low for fun, but Tom crashes fatally. Al, the senior cadet, is discharged from the Air Corps.

Sally tells Al and Carolyn that she is pregnant with Jeff's child. Jeff admits to Carolyn that he secretly continued to see Sally because she threatened to destroy his reputation. Carolyn breaks up with Jeff. Al marries Sally, partly because he loves her and partly to protect Jeff. After a while, Sally tells Al that she lied about being pregnant, and he tells her he knew all along. Upset and believing that he never loved her, Sally leaves him.

After graduating, Jeff is about to go up in the air to participate in war game training. He meets Al, who is now an enlisted crew chief on his B-17 bomber. When their old mentor and the unit's commander, Captain Mercer, finds out about Al, he starts working to get him reinstated as an officer candidate and pilot.

Then Sally shows up, begging Al for help, saying she is wanted for the murder of her gangster friend, a crime she admits she committed. Al gives her some money and reluctantly promises to meet her later. Before she can leave the hangar, Air Corps officers enter the building. Sally hides inside a bomber. She is still there when the aircraft takes off, with Jeff as pilot. When the games are completed, Mercer asks Jeff to ready an emergency flare. Al goes to fetch them and discovers Sally. As they argue, a flare is ignited by accident. Before they can drop it out the bomb bay, Mercer is burned and falls out of the aircraft. Using a parachute, Al jumps after him and rescues him. Jeff manages to land the bomber in the dark to pick up his crew members. After learning that Mercer needs to get to a hospital immediately, he tries to take off again, disregarding Mercer's order to stay put. He crashes and Sally is killed.

Al takes the witness stand and tells the full story. Jeff is cleared of all charges and reunites with Carolyn. Al is reinstated as a pilot trainee and Mercer eventually recovers.

== Cast ==
- Ray Milland as Jeff Young
- William Holden as Al Ludlow
- Wayne Morris as Tom Cassidy
- Brian Donlevy as Captain Mercer
- Constance Moore as Carolyn Bartlett
- Veronica Lake as Sally Vaughn
- Harry Davenport as 'Sandbags' Riley
- Phil Brown as Jimmy Masters
- Edward Fielding as President of the Court
- Willard Robertson as Judge Advocate
- Richard Lane as Flight Commander
- Addison Richards as Flight Surgeon
- Hobart Cavanaugh as Mickey
- Douglas Aylesworth as Lieut. Hopkins
- John Trent as Lieut. Ronson
- Archie R. Twitchell as Lieut. Clankton
- Richard Webb as Cadet Captain
- John Hiestand as Radio Announcer

== Production ==
Bernie Lay Jr.'s book was published in 1937.

Filming began on August 26. In early August William Holden let Paramount know he was refusing to turn up as he wanted a raise from his salary of $500 a week. Production on I Wanted Wings began in the summer of 1940 at Randolph Field near San Antonio, Texas. Principal photography took place from August 26 to December 19, 1940. The United States Army Air Corps provided 1,160 aircraft, 1,050 cadets, 450 officers and instructors and 2,543 enlisted men for the film. One of the film's premieres was subsequently held at Randolph Field.

During rehearsal, Veronica Lake's hair fell over her eye, leading to the famous hairstyle that helped make her a star.

Paramount's production company relied heavily on location shooting, bringing 130 actors and technicians to Texas. The cast and crew blended in with over 200 student pilots in primary training. Aerial coordinator Paul Mantz was able to use massed formations of North American BT-9 and BT-14 trainers. He was backed up by Elmer Dyer, Hollywood's best aerial cinematographer, filming from Mantz's Lockheed Orion camera ship, equipped with six different camera positions. The early series Boeing B-17B bombers from the 19th Bomb Group, March Field, were also prominently utilized in the final aerial sequence. Additional footage was shot at Paramount Studios in Hollywood, where a B-17 mock-up, built for $40,000, was used for the climactic interior aircraft scenes.

== Reception ==
I Wanted Wings, released when the U.S. was still neutral in World War II, was well received as the first film to promote the then little-known Army Air Corps in anticipation of the necessary aviation training to come. Bosley Crowther of The New York Times noted that "Paramount set out to exalt the spirit and efficiency of the program whereby hundreds of keen American youngsters are now being trained to fly—as military pilots, firstly, and as the nucleus of a future nation of winged men... this cinematic salute to the Army Air Corps and to the young men who are entering it today is a vastly exciting motion picture and a dependable inspiration to the youth of the land."

Its writer, Richard Maibaum, who would go on to write twelve of the first fifteen James Bond films, was very proud of writing this film. This was "the first movie that introduced the American public to the importance of training airmen for the defense of the United States in a war many recognized as coming," his widow Sylvia reported when she donated his papers to the University of Iowa.

Diabolique called it "an entirely decent piece of 1940 Hollywood hokum, mostly worth seeing today for Lake. She doesn’t appear until more than half-way through but it’s a spectacular entrance – singing in a nightclub under a spotlight – and she lifts the entire movie: pint-sized, seductive, mischievous, with a delectable voice and mien."

== Awards ==
Farciot Edouart, Gordon Jennings and Louis Mesenkop won the Academy Award for Best Visual Effects at the 14th Academy Awards.

== Radio adaptation ==
Lux Radio Theatre broadcast an adaptation of I Wanted Wings on CBS Radio on March 30, 1942. The one-hour episode's cast included Lake, Milland, Holden, and Donlevy.
