= Marc Schneider =

Marc Schneider may refer to:

- Marc Schneider (footballer) (born 1980), retired Swiss footballer
- Marc Schneider (rower) (born 1973), American rower

== See also ==
- Mark Schneider (disambiguation)
