= Knothe =

Knothe is a surname of German origin. Notable people with the surname include:

- Dietrich Knothe (1929–2000), German conductor and choral conductor
- Fritz Knothe (1903–1963), American baseball player
- George Knothe (1898–1981), American baseball player
- Jan Knothe (1912–1977), Polish architect, artist, graphic designer, writer, poet and diplomat
- Noel Knothe (born 1999), German footballer

== See also ==
- Knoth
