= Douglas Smythe =

American visual effects artist

- Occupation: Visual effects artist

Douglas Smythe is an American visual effects artist. He won an Academy Award in the category Best Visual Effects for the film Death Becomes Her.

== Selected filmography ==
- Death Becomes Her (1991; co-won with Ken Ralston, Doug Chiang and Tom Woodruff Jr.)
