= Farciot Edouart =

Film artist and innovator (1894-1980)

Farciot Edouart, ASC (born Alexander Farciot Edouart; November 5, 1894 – March 17, 1980) was a film special-effects artist and innovator perhaps best known for his work with process photography, also known as rear projection.

Edouart was born in Northern California. His father was a portrait photographer. He began working as a cameraman while still a teenager at the production company of Hobart Bosworth.

By way of mergers and acquisitions, Edouart became an employee of Paramount Pictures, where he began to specialize on optical effects in the mid-1920s. He worked for Paramount until his department was abruptly closed in 1967. He worked on approximately 350 films, and his final film was Rosemary's Baby (1968). Edouart won a total of ten Academy Awards: two competitive (1942 and 1943), seven technical and scientific awards (1938, 1940, two in 1944 and 1948 and two in 1956) and an honorary award for special effects (1939). Leonard Maltin wrote: "The master of process-screen photography is Farciot Edouart."

== Academy Awards ==
- In 1939, Edouart shared a special Academy Award for Best Visual Effects "for outstanding achievement in creating special photographic and sound effects" for Spawn of the North.
- In 1940, he received a nomination for Union Pacific.
- In 1940, he received an Academy Award for Technical Achievement along with Joseph E. Robbins and William Rudolph for "the design and construction of a quiet portable treadmill."
- In 1941, he received nominations for Dr. Cyclops and Typhoon (both with Gordon Jennings).
- In 1942, he won the award for I Wanted Wings and was nominated for Aloma of the South Seas (both with Gordon Jennings).
- In 1943, Edouart won the award for Reap the Wild Wind (with Jennings and William Pereira).
- In 1944, he was nominated for So Proudly We Hail! (with Jennings).
- In 1945, he received a nomination for The Story of Dr. Wassell (with Jennings).
- In 1948, he received a nomination for Unconquered (with Devereux Jennings and Gordon Jennings).
