= Michael L. Dorrough =

American inventor and audio engineer

Michael L. Dorrough (born January 1942), American inventor and audio engineer regarded as the “father of multi-band processing.” He is the founder of Dorrough Electronics and inventor of the Discriminate Audio Processor (DAP) in 1973, and the Dorrough Loudness Monitor. While the DAP product instantly changed audio processing in the broadcast world, the company is best known for its award-winning “eyebrow” scale audio loudness monitors in widespread use throughout the motion picture, recording and broadcast industries worldwide.

== Biography ==
Born in San Francisco. Began his career as a recording engineer in 1963 at Casey Kasam and Bob Hudson's Emperor Productions. While focusing on recording, he maintained working relationships with several of the Los Angeles radio stations, bridging the gap between the two mediums, which enabled him to experiment with audio processing.

Later at RCA, he continued his research on his theory that audio processing should be directed toward perceived power and not on amplitude alone. The first composite tri-band processor was incorporated into the recording sessions of such artists as Jefferson Airplane and Carol Burnett. In 1970 Dorrough Electronics was formed to market this product.

Aware of the inconsistencies in the metering of program levels, he realized that to maintain consistent listening levels that there must be a relationship between the peak and the average content, and that both should be displayed on a common scale. His development of a LED meter displaying both peak and average ballistics with dual reference points is used for audio program level indications throughout the world.

Dorrough is a native of Los Angeles and lives in Woodland Hills, California. He is married and has five children.

== Awards and honors ==
- 1990 Audio Engineering Society: Fellowship Award presented for his development of multiband audio processing and the dual loudness meter, September 24.
- 1993 Academy of Motion Picture Arts and Sciences: Technical Achievement Award for design and development of the compound meter known as the Dorrough Level Meter, February 26.
- 2000 National Association of Broadcasters: Radio Engineering Achievement Award for his significant contribution to the art of audio processing and audio monitoring, April 12.
- 2000 Academy of Television Arts and Sciences: Emmy Award for the Dorrough Loudness Meter as the standard of the industry for accurately determining audio levels, July 11.

== US Patents ==
- Dual Loudness Meter and Method; Patent number 4,528,501, June 9, 1985
- Dynamic Video Luminance and Chrominance Meter; Patent number 5,216,492, June 1, 1993
- Sequential Audio Switcher; Patent number 5,343,534, August 30, 1994
- Level Meter for Digitally Encoded Audio; Patent number 5,751,819, May 12, 1998
- Power Line Meter/Monitor with LED Display; Patent number 6,198,403, March 6, 2001
