= Fred Knoth =

American special effects expert

Fred C. Knoth (September 12, 1907 – November 1990) was a special effects artist who was the longtime special effects head of Universal Studios. He won a 1955 Academy Award for Technical Achievement with Orien Ernest for "the development of a hand portable, electric, dry oil-fog machine".

Knoth graduated with a civil engineering degree in 1932 from the University of Colorado Boulder where he was a member of Phi Kappa Tau fraternity.
