= Gordon Jennings =

American special effects artist

- Born: Henry Gordon Jennings; 1896; Salt Lake City, Utah, U.S.
- Died: January 11, 1953 (aged 56–57); Hollywood, California, U.S.
- Occupation: Special effects artist
- Years active: 1919–1953

Gordon Jennings, A.S.C. (1896 – January 11, 1953) was an American special effects artist. He received seven Academy Awards (mainly for Best Special Effects) and was nominated for eight more in the same category. After starting 1919 in Hollywood as camera assistant he worked from 1932 until 1953 on the visual and special effects of more than 180 films. His older brother was cinematographer Devereaux Jennings (1884-1952), who filmed, for instance, Buster Keaton's monumental The General in 1926.

== Awards and nominations ==
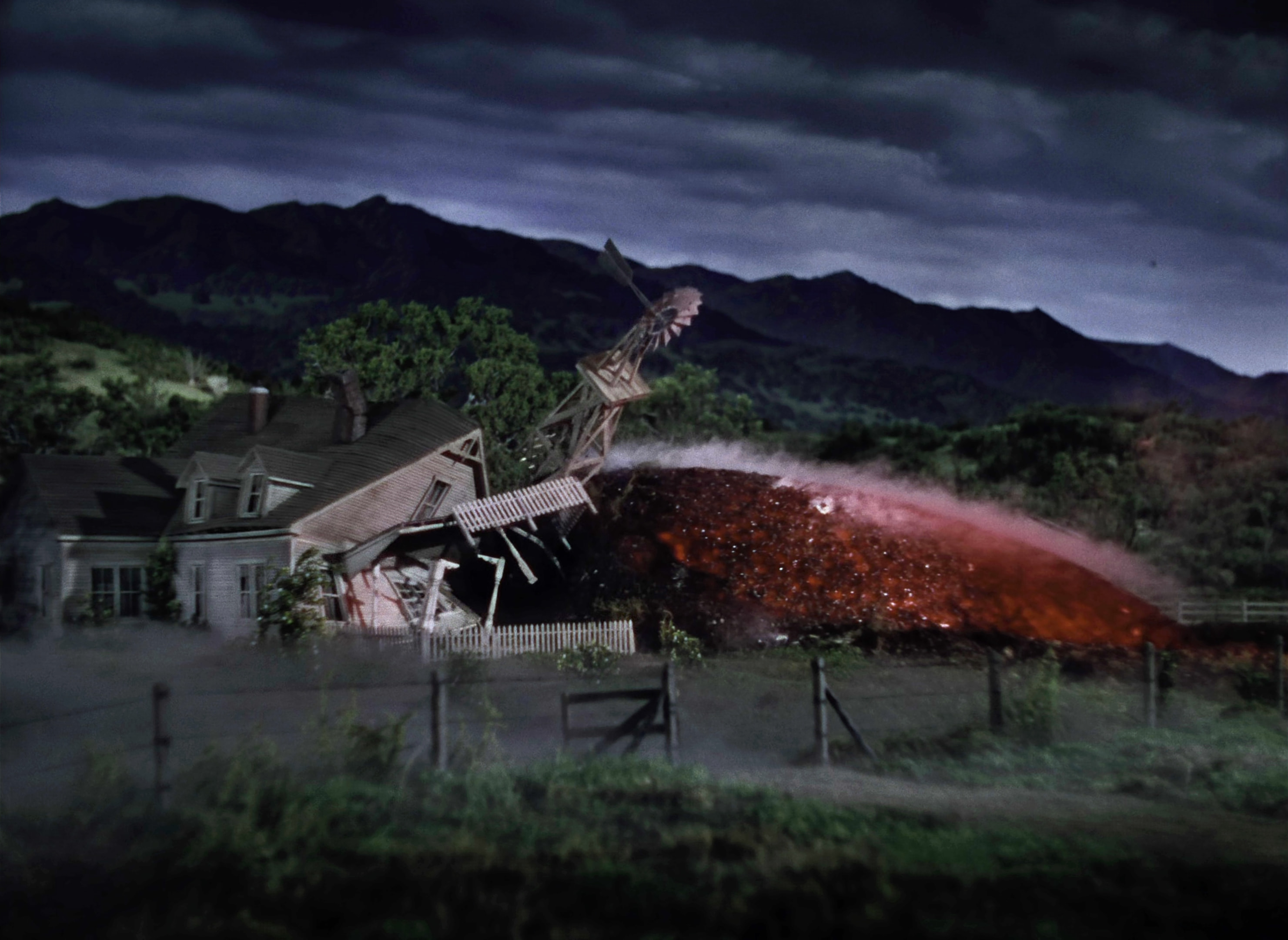
Screenshot from The War of the Worlds

Jennings received seven Academy Awards (mainly for "Best Special Effects") and was nominated for eight more. In 1942, he beat himself winning the Academy Award for his work in 1941 on I Wanted Wings with Farciot Edouart against his second nomination for Aloma of the South Seas with Louis Mesenkop. In 1952, he was decorated twice for When Worlds Collide and with an "Award for Technical Achievement". His last receipt of an Academy Award was posthumous, when The War of the Worlds was decorated during the 1954 ceremony.

Won or decorated

- 1938: Spawn of the North, Academy Honorary Award "for outstanding achievement in creating Special Photographic and Sound Effects in the Paramount production, Spawn of the North"
- 1941: I Wanted Wings
- 1942: Reap the Wild Wind
- 1944: Scientific or Technical Award (Class III) "for the design and construction of the Paramount nodal point tripod"
- 1951: When Worlds Collide, Category "Special Effects", not competitively but as Special Achievement Academy Award
- 1951: Scientific or Technical Award (Class II) "for the design, construction and application of a servo-operated recording and repeating device"
- 1953: The War of the Worlds, Category "Special Effects", not competitively but as Special Achievement Academy Award (posthumous)

Nominated

- 1939: Union Pacific
- 1940: Typhoon
- 1940: Dr. Cyclops
- 1941: Aloma of the South Seas
- 1943: So Proudly We Hail!
- 1944: The Story of Dr. Wassell
- 1947: Unconquered
- 1950: Samson and Delilah

== Filmography ==
- The Island of Doctor Moreau (1933)
- Peter Ibbetson (1935)
- The Plainsman (1936)
- If I Were King (1938)
- I Married a Witch (1942)
- For Whom the Bell Tolls (1943)
- Lady in the Dark (1944)
- Rainbow Island (1944)
- Here Come the Waves (1944)
- Love Letters (1945)
- Kitty (1945)
- The Lost Weekend (1945)
- Two Years Before the Mast (1946)
- Golden Earrings (1947)
- Wild Harvest (1947)
- Sorry, Wrong Number (1948)
- The Big Clock (1948)
- Miss Tatlock's Millions (1948)
- Bride of Vengeance (1949)
- Song of Surrender (1949)
- Rope of Sand (1949)
- The Furies (1950)
- When Worlds Collide (1951)
- The Turning Point (1952)
- Thunder in the East (1952)
- Anything Can Happen (1952)
- Son of Paleface (1952)
- The Greatest Show on Earth (1952)
- The War of the Worlds (1953)
- Botany Bay (1953)
- The Stooge (1953)
- Shane (1953)
- Stalag 17 (1953)
- The Eternal Woman (1954)
