= Joseph E. Robbins =

American film technician

Joseph E. Robbins (11 June 1901 - 7 July 1989) was an American film technician, who received three Academy Awards for Technical Achievement.

== Life ==
In the late 1920s Robbins was responsible for the car pool of Paramount Pictures.

Robbins later worked as film technician for Paramount Pictures and at the 10th Academy Awards he was awarded his first Oscar for Technical Achievement, which he received for "an exceptional application of acoustic principles to the sound proofing of gasoline generators and water pumps".

At the 12th Academy Awards he, Farciot Edouart and William Rudolph were awarded an Oscar, again for Technical Achievement, this time for "the design and construction of a quiet portable treadmill" .

He was awarded his third Oscar for Technical Achievement at the 17th Academy Awards, together with Russell Brown and Ray Hinsdale for "the development and production use of the Paramount floating hydraulic boat rocker".

== Awards ==
- 10th Academy Awards: Academy Award for Technical Achievement
- 12th Academy Awards: Academy Award for Technical Achievement
- 17th Academy Awards: Academy Award for Technical Achievement

== Work ==
- Quiet Gasoline Engine Propelled Apparatus. SAE Technical Paper 400032, 1940, doi:10.4271/400032.
