= Joseph Robbins (priest) =

19th-century Anglican priest in Ireland

Joseph Frederick Robbins was a 19th-century Anglican priest in Ireland. He was the son of Captain Joseph Robbins of Suir Castle, Co. Tipperary. He married Mary Caroline Lyons, daughter of Tension Lyons and Eleanor Frazier, on 6 January 1840. He died on 21 July 1886.

Robbins was educated at Trinity College, Dublin and ordained in 1833. He served curacies at Terryglass, Nenagh and Monsea. He was Vicar of Kilrush from 1847 to 1862; Rector of Castletownarra from 1862; and Dean of Killaloe from 1880 to 1886.
