= Mole-Richardson =

Mole-Richardson, also known as Mole, was an American stage lighting instrument and motion picture lighting manufacturing company originally based in Hollywood, California. The company was started in 1927 by Italian immigrant Pietro "Peter" Mule (changed to Mole). Born November 10, 1891, in the Italian town of Termini Imerese, Sicily, he first worked for General Electric (GE) in New York.

In 1927 he began selling incandescent tungsten lighting to the film industry, which allowed a more natural lighting than the previous arc lights. The new lights were also silent, an advantage for the new sound films.

Mole-Richardson invented the Fresnel Solar Spot unit in 1935, adapting the fresnel lighthouse lens for use in motion pictures. It won the first of four technical Academy Awards the company earned.

During World War II, Mole-Richardson concentrated their efforts on developing searchlights for battleships, tanks and artillery units to aid the Allied Forces' battle in Europe and the Pacific. In 1945, Peter Mole was invited to light the first United Nations conference held in San Francisco.

Peter Mole died on August 2, 1960, very suddenly. His son-in-law, Warren Parker, took over the company. Mole-Richardson Company LLC was now run by Michael Parker, one of Warren Parker's four sons and grandson of Peter Mole.

Mole-Richardson was considered by many to be the staple of motion picture and television lighting in the movie industry today, setting the standard for tungsten Fresnel fixtures. However, they do also manufacture HMI (Hydrargyrum Medium-arc Iodide) day-light lighting units. They had also introduced LED lights which consumed less power and generated less heat. Their lighting instruments were generally recognized by their maroon coloring and "MR" logo.

In August 2015, the company moved to Pacoima neighborhood of Los Angeles, California.

In July 2021 the company moved to Sylmar, CA. 15148 Bledsoe St. Unit A, Sylmar, CA 91342.

By December 31, 2025, the company had ceased trading and auctioned off its entire stock of lighting and manufacturing equipment, ending their long legacy and ceasing operations.
