= Takuo Miyagishima =

Japanese-American design engineer and inventor

- Born: March 15, 1928; Gardena, California, U.S.
- Died: August 4, 2011 (aged 83); Los Angeles, California, U.S.
- Other name: Tak Miyagishima
- Occupation: Design engineer
- Years active: 1954–2009

Takuo Miyagishima (Japanese: 宮城島 卓夫, March 15, 1928 – August 4, 2011) was an American design engineer who worked for Panavision. He was responsible for many of the company's innovations in motion picture photography and projection, and also designed the company's logo.

In 2005, Miyagishima received the Gordon E. Sawyer Award for his achievements and successful career at the 77th Academy Awards.

== Early years ==
Miyagishima was born in Gardena, California in 1928, to Japanese emigrant parents from Shizuoka. He had one brother and two sisters. He grew up in Long Beach and Terminal Island.

Miyagishima was attending junior high school in 1941 when World War II began, and was able to avoid the Japanese American internment by moving to Utah to live with relatives. He graduated from Davis High School in Kaysville.

== Career at Panavision ==
Miyagishima worked for Panavision from 1954 until his retirement in 2009, by which time he was Senior Vice-President of Engineering.

His first project was the Super Panatar projection lens in 1955. He helped develop Panavision's Primo Series of lenses, used for films including Empire of the Sun; these lenses received Academy and Emmy awards. He received the Fuji Gold Medal in 1991 for his single autofocusing anamorphic camera lens. He also worked on Panavision's Panaflex Motion Picture Camera System and Auto Panatar anamorphic photographic lens. With Albert Saiki, he developed an award-winning Eyepiece Leveler.

Miyagishima died in 2011, aged 83. Panavision's T-series line of anamorphic lenses, introduced in 2016, are named in his honor.

== Awards ==
He received the John A. Bonner Medal of Commendation from AMPAS in 1999, and the Academy's Gordon E. Sawyer Award presented at the Scientific and Technical Awards Dinner on February 12, 2005. In 1999 he also received the American Society of Cinematographers' President's Award, shared with Albert Mayer. He was a member of the Academy of Motion Picture Arts and Sciences and the Society of Motion Picture and Television Engineers.
