= Mark Robert Schneider =

American historian and author

Mark Robert Schneider (born March 4, 1948) is a retired history professor and an author. He has written about Christianity and race in colonial American and Boston during the Jim Crow era.

In 2017 he appeared on C-SPAN discussing his book on Gerry Studds, the first openly gay member of the U.S. congress.

He was a professor at Suffolk University.

== Writings ==
- Boston confronts Jim Crow, 1890-1920 Northeastern University Press (1997) ISBN 978-1-55553-296-3
- "We Return Fighting”: The Civil Rights Movement in the Jazz Age Boston Northeastern University Press (2002)
- Joe Moakley's Journey: From South Boston to El Salvador
- Gerry Studs: America’s First Openly Gay Congressman
- Colonial Weymouth: The Forgotten Second Settlement
- Arrogance of Faith: Christianity and Race in America from the Colonial Era to the Twentieth Century, co-author with Forrest G. Wood, Northeastern University Press ISBN 978-1-55553-096-9
