= Wratten number =

Labeling system for optical filters

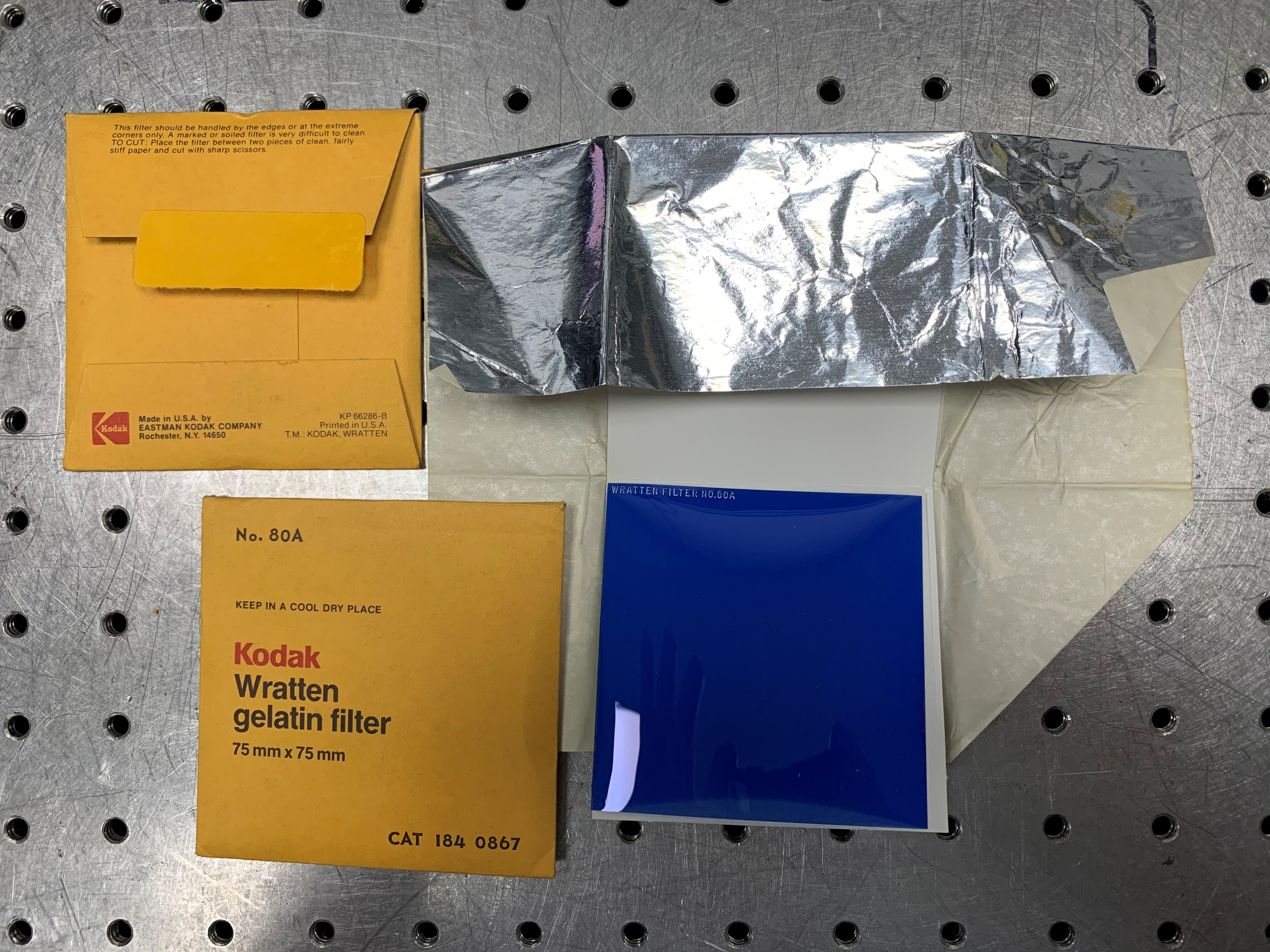
Kodak Wratten filter 80A in its original packaging

Wratten numbers are a labeling system for optical filters, usually for photographic use comprising a number sometimes followed by a letter. The number denotes the color of the filter and its spectral characteristics, and these numbers can be grouped into broad categories, but the numbering system is arbitrary within a group and does not encode any information. For example, within the photometric group of color correction filters, the 80A–80D are blue, while the next filters in numerical order, 81A–81EF, are orange. Letters almost always increase with increasing strength (the exception being 2B, 2A, 2C, 2E).

== History and use ==
They are named for the founder of the first photography company, British inventor Frederick Wratten. Wratten and partner C.E.K. Mees sold their company to Eastman Kodak in 1912, and Kodak started manufacturing Wratten filters. They remain in production, and are sold under license through the Tiffen corporation.

Wratten numbering overview
No.	Color / Use
0–2	Colorless
3–18	Yellows
19–29	Oranges & Reds
30–36	Magentas & Violets
37–50	Blues & Blue Greens
51–69	Greens
70–77	Monochromats
78–86	Photometrics
87+	Miscellaneous

The numbering scheme can be divided into broad categories by use including color, monochromats, photometrics, and miscellaneous.

Wratten filters are often used in observational astronomy by amateur astronomers. Color filters for visual observing made by GSO, Baader, Lumicon, or other companies are actually Wratten filters mounted in standard 1 1/4 in (32 mm) or 2 in (nominal, 48 mm actual) filter threads. For imaging interference filters are used. Wratten filters are also used in photomicrography.

Other manufacturers of photographic filters may use Wratten numbers for identification, but these may not precisely match the spectral definition for that number. This is especially true for filters used for aesthetic (as opposed to technical) reasons. For example, an 81B warming filter is a filter used to slightly "warm" the colors in a color photo, making the scene a bit less blue and more red. Many manufacturers make filters labeled as 81B with transmission curves which are similar, but not identical, to the Kodak Wratten 81B. This is according to that manufacturer's idea of how best to warm a scene, and depending on the dyes and layering techniques used in manufacturing. Some manufacturers use their own designations to avoid this confusion, for example Singh-Ray has a warming filter which they designate A‑13, which is not a Wratten number. Filters used where precisely specified and repeatable characteristics are required, e.g. for printing press color separation and scientific work, use more standardized and rigorous coding systems.

In digital photography, where the color temperature can be adjusted and color corrections can be easily accomplished in the camera (by firmware) or in software, the need for color filters has all but disappeared. Thus, it has become difficult to find Wratten filters in photography stores.

=== Subsets ===
Some filters are listed in tables of Wratten filters with codes which do not follow the original number-letter scheme, e.g. K2, G, X0, FL‑W; CC‑50Y. In some cases, these are alternate designations for the filters, and used by Kodak to recommend sets of filters for use with specific purposes. For instance, some sets were for commercial photographers to adjust contrast in black-and-white photography with orthochromatic and panchromatic films.

Wratten subsets
Purpose		Filters		Notes
Purpose		Alt	Wratten	Notes
Commercial		K1	6	Correction for short exposures
Commercial		K2	8	Orthochromatic film
Commercial		K3	9	Panchromatic film; later replaced by X1 (#11)
Commercial		G	15	Increase contrast of yellow objects
Commercial		A	25	Increase contrast of brown objects
Commercial		B2	58	Increase contrast of red objects; commonly known as B
Commercial		C5	47	Photograph blue as white; replaces C4 (#49) with a comparable filter factor as updated A and B2
Commercial		F	29	Blueprints; photograph red as white
Three-color separation		A	25	Red alternatives include 22, 23, 23A, 24, 24A, 27, 27A, 28, 29
Three-color separation		B2	58	Green alternatives include 40, 40A, 56, 57, 57A, 59, 59A, 60, 61
Three-color separation		C4	49	Blue alternatives include 45, 46, 47, 47A, 48, 48A, 49A, 49B, 49C
Two-color separation	Taking	Cine Red	28	
Two-color separation	Taking	Cine Green 2	40A	For tungsten, consider 40 or 60
Two-color separation	Viewing	A	25	
Two-color separation	Viewing	Minus Red 4	44	
Two-color separation	Projection	Two-Color Red	23B	
Two-color separation	Projection	Two-color Blue Green	69	
Two-color separation	Anaglyph	Stereo Red	26	
Two-color separation	Anaglyph	Stereo Green	55	
Two-color separation	Reproduction	See notes		Depending on the colors used, consider one of six pairs: (29,44) (25,58) (22,60) (21,45) (15,49) (8,50)
Microscopy		A	25	Used singly or paired with D to approximate monochromatic light with 670 nm.
Microscopy		B2	58	Used singly or paired with H, G, or E to approximate monochromatic light with 510, 540, or 575 nm, respectively.
Microscopy		C5	47	Used singly or paired with H to approximate monochromatic light with 460 nm, respectively.
Microscopy		D	35	Used singly or paired with H to approximate monochromatic light with 445 nm, respectively.
Microscopy		E2	22	Used paired with B to approximate monochromatic light with 575 nm, respectively.
Microscopy		F	29	Used singly to approximate monochromatic light with 625 nm, respectively.
Microscopy		G	15	Used singly or paired with B or H to approximate monochromatic light with 540 or 525 nm, respectively.
Microscopy		H	45	Used singly or paired with B, C, D, or G to approximate monochromatic light with 510, 460, 445, or 525 nm, respectively.
Microscopy		X1	11	Used singly with tungsten light; replaces K1

=== Color correction filters ===
Nomogram to compute mired shift; light source is on the top scale, while film is on the bottom scale.

The Wratten filters numbered with 80, 81, 82, and 85x are color conversion filters used to avoid unnatural colour casts when photographing scenes where the color temperature of the light source does not match the rated color temperature of the film, which is available in Tungsten and Daylight types. While the Wratten 80 and 82 series are cooling filters with blue tones, the 81 and 85 series are warming filters. The 80/85 series are regarded as "color conversion" filters, while the corresponding 82/81 series are "light balancing filters" which generally have a weaker effect than the 80/85 series.

To avoid confusion, some filter manufacturers use the mired shift to name their filters, which quantifies the effect of a color conversion filter; the mired shift is distinct from the Wratten number.

The mired value associated with a given color temperature is computed as the reciprocal of the color temperature, in Kelvin, multiplied by $10^6$:

$M = \frac{{10}^{6}}{T}$

The shift is the difference in the mired values of the film and light source. Sometimes the decamired is used, where 10 mired = 1 decamired, as the smallest perceptible color temperature change is from a 10 mired shift.

$\Delta M = M_{film} - M_{light} = \frac{{10}^{6}}{T_{film}} - \frac{{10}^{6}}{T_{light}}$

Mired shift of color correction / light balancing filters and Wratten equivalents
$\Delta M$	-130	-120	-110	-100	-90	-80	-70	-60	-50	-40	-30	-20	-10	$\Delta M$
Wratten	80A		80B			80C		80D	82C		82B	82A	82	Wratten
Wratten	81	81A	81B, 81C	81D	81EF			85C			85		85B	Wratten
$\Delta M$	+10	+20	+30	+40	+50	+60	+70	+80	+90	+100	+110	+120	+130	$\Delta M$

From the equation, when the film has a higher color temperature than the light source, a negative mired shift is required, which calls for a "cooling" filter; these have a perceptible blue color, and the more saturated the color, the stronger the cooling effect. Likewise, when the film has a lower color temperature than the light source, a positive mired shift is required, which calls for an amber "warming" filter.

Stacking color conversion filters creates an additive mired shift: for example, stacking a Wratten 80A (-130 mired) with a Wratten 82C (-60 mired) results in a total mired shift of -190. A typical set of color conversion filters has a geometric sequence, e.g. ±15, ±30, ±60, and ±120 mired, which approximates the sequence established by the Wratten filters, and allows intermediate values to be obtained by stacking.

== Reference table ==
The commonly available numbers and some of their uses include:

Wratten numbering scheme
Wratten number	Visible color	Filter factor or alternate designation	F‑stops correction	Uses and characteristics
Colorless
1A				Called a ‘skylight’ filter, this absorbs ultraviolet radiation, which reduces haze in outdoor color landscape photography; darkens the blue sky and by contrast lightens clouds
2B	pale yellow			Absorbs ultraviolet radiation, slightly less than #2A (letters out-of-order). Longpass filter blocking wavelengths shorter than 395 nm. Used for high-altitude photography.
2A	pale yellow			Absorbs ultraviolet radiation and heightens contrast of clouds against blue sky. Longpass filter blocking wavelengths shorter than 405 nm. Used for high-altitude photography.
2C				Absorbs ultraviolet radiation. Longpass filter blocking wavelengths shorter than 390 nm. Used for high-altitude photography.
2E	pale yellow			Absorbs ultraviolet radiation, slightly more than #2A. Longpass filter blocking wavelengths shorter than 415 nm. Used for high-altitude photography.
Wratten number	Visible color	Filter factor or alternate designation	F‑stops correction	Uses and characteristics
Yellows
3	light yellow	Aero No. 1		Absorbs excessive sky blue, making sky look slightly darker in black & white images. Can be used with carefully chosen color film, or with color balancing during printing, to heighten contrast of clouds against blue sky. Longpass filter blocking wavelengths shorter than 440 nm. Used for high-altitude photography, and in astronomy to mask achromatic lens color-fringing.
4	yellow	Minus-violet		Longpass filter blocking visible wavelengths shorter than 455 nm. Used for high-altitude photography, and in astronomy to mask achromatic lens color-fringing.
6	light yellow	K1		Not a longpass filter
8	yellow	K2	1	Absorbs more blue than #3. Longpass filter blocking visible wavelengths shorter than 465 nm
9	deep yellow	K3		Absorbs more blue than #8. Longpass filter blocking visible wavelengths shorter than 470 nm
11	yellowish-green	X1	2	Heightens contrast of skin tones in black & white photography. Not a longpass filter
12	deep yellow	Minus-blue	1 1/3	Minus-blue filter; complements #32 minus-green and #44A minus-red. Used with Ektachrome or Aerochrome Infrared films to obtain false-color results. Used in ophthalmology and optometry in conjunction with a slit-lamp and a cobalt blue light to improve contrast when assessing the health of the cornea and the fit of contact lenses. Longpass filter blocking visible wavelengths shorter than 500 nm
13	green	X2	2	Color enhancement. Not a long-pass filter
15	deep yellow	G	1 2/3	Profoundly darkens the sky in black & white outdoor photography. Longpass filter blocking visible wavelengths shorter than 510 nm
16	yellow-orange		1 2/3	Performs like #15, but more so. Longpass filter blocking visible wavelengths shorter than about 520 nm
18A	visually opaque			Based on Wood's glass, transmits small bands of ultraviolet radiation and infrared radiation. Used to block visible light from UV lamps.
18B	very deep violet			Similar to 18A but with wider bands of transmittance in both the ultraviolet and infrared, a less 'pure' filter.
Wratten number	Visible color	Filter factor or alternate designation	F‑stops correction	Uses and characteristics
Oranges and Reds
21	orange	YA3	2	Contrast filter for blue and blue-green absorption. Longpass filter blocking visible wavelengths shorter than 530 nm
22	deep orange	E2	2 1/3	Contrast filter, greater effect than #21. Longpass filter blocking visible wavelengths shorter than 550 nm
23A	light red	E Red (light)		Longpass filter blocking visible wavelengths shorter than 550 nm
24	red	Projection red		Used for color separation of Kodachrome transparency film, complements #47B and #61. Longpass filter blocking visible wavelengths shorter than 575 nm. Red for 'two color photography' (daylight or tungsten). White flame arc tri-color projection.
25	red tricolor	A (Tricolor Red)	3	Used for color separation and infrared photography. Longpass filter blocking short of 580 nm
26	red	Stereo Red		Longpass filter blocking short of 585 nm
29	deep red	F	4	Used for color separation, complements #47 and #61. In black and white outdoor photography makes blue skies look very dark, almost black. In infrared photography, blocks much visible light, increasing the effect of the infrared frequencies on the picture. Longpass filter blocking short of 600 nm.
Wratten number	Visible color	Filter factor or alternate designation	F‑stops correction	Uses and characteristics
Magentas and Violets
32	magenta	Minus-Green 3		Minus-green. Complements #12 minus-blue and #44A minus-red
33	magenta			Contrast filter for strongest green absorption. For photomechanical color masking
34	Indigo	D (light)		
34A	violet	D		Used for minus-green and plus-blue separation
35	Navy	D		
Wratten number	Visible color	Filter factor or alternate designation	F‑stops correction	Uses and characteristics
Blues and Blue Greens
38A	blue			Absorbs red, some UV, and some green light
40	light green	Cine Green 1		Green, for 'two color photography' (tungsten).
44	light blue-green	Minus-Red 4		Minus-red filter with substantial UV absorption
44A	light blue-green	Minus-Red 5		Complements #12 minus-blue, and #32 minus-green
47	blue tricolor	C5		Used for color separation. Complements #29 and #61
47A	light blue	Stage Blue		By removing much light that is not blue, blue and purple objects show a broader range of colors. Used for medical applications that involve making dyes fluoresce
47B	deep blue tricolor			Used for color separation. It is also commonly used to calibrate video monitors while using SMPTE color bars.
50	deep blue	LG or L		
Wratten number	Visible color	Filter factor or alternate designation	F‑stops correction	Uses and characteristics
Greens
56	light green	B3		
57	green	B2 (light)		Green for daylight 'two color photography'.
58	green tricolor	B2		Color separation.
60	green	P		Green for 'two color photography' (tungsten).
61	deep green tricolor	N		Color separation, complements #29 and #47.
Wratten number	Visible color	Filter factor or alternate designation	F‑stops correction	Uses and characteristics
Monochromats
70	red	α-(contrast R)		Used for color separation and infrared photography; longpass filter blocking short of 650 nm.
74	dark green monochromat	ε		Transmits 10% of green radiation and virtually no yellow radiation from mercury-vapor illumination.
Wratten number	Visible color	Filter factor or alternate designation	F‑stops correction	Uses and characteristics
Photometrics
80A	blue	4	2	Raises the scene's color temperature from 3200 K to approximately 5500 K, which allows use of daylight balanced film with tungsten lighting. Results in mired shift of -131.
80B	blue	3	1 2/3	Similar to 80A; 3400 K→5500 K. Results in mired shift of -112.
80C	blue	2	1	Similar to 80A; 3800 K→5500 K. Typically used so that old-style flashbulbs could be used on a daylight film. Results in mired shift of -81.
80D	blue	1.5	1/3	Similar to 80A; 4200 K→5500 K. Results in mired shift of -56.
81A	pale orange	1.4	1/3	Warming filter to decrease the color temperature slightly. Can be used when shooting with type B film balanced for tungsten lighting (3200 K) with 3400 K photoflood lights. The opposite of 82A. Results in mired shift of +18.
81B	pale orange	1.4	1/3	Warming filter, slightly stronger than 81A. The opposite of 82B. Results in mired shift of +27.
81C	pale orange	1.5	1/3	Warming filter, slightly stronger than 81B. The opposite of 82C. Results in mired shift of +35.
81D	pale orange		2/3	Warming filter, slightly stronger than 81C. Results in mired shift of +42.
81EF	pale orange		2/3	Warming filter, stronger than 81D. Results in mired shift of +52.
82A	pale blue	1.3	1/3	Cooling filter to increase the color temperature slightly. The opposite of 81A. Results in mired shift of -21.
82B	pale blue	1.4	2/3	Cooling filter, slightly stronger than 82A and opposite of 81B. Can also be used when shooting tungsten type B film (3200 K) with household 100 W electric bulbs (2900 K). Results in mired shift of -32.
82C	pale blue	1.5	2/3	Cooling filter, slightly stronger than 82B and opposite of 81C. Results in mired shift of -45.
85	amber	1.5	2/3	Color conversion, the opposite of the 80B; this is a warming filter that takes an outdoor scene lit by sunlight (which has a color temperature around 5500 K) and makes it appear to be lit by tungsten incandescent bulbs around 3400 K. This allows an indoor balanced film to be used to photograph outdoors. These filters were used in Super 8 movie cameras that were designed to use Tungsten film. Results in mired shift of +112.
85B	amber	1.5	2/3	Similar to 85; converts 5500 K→3200 K. Results in mired shift of +131.
85C	amber	1.5	1/3	Similar to 85; converts 5500 K→3800 K. Results in mired shift of +81.
85N3	amber			Neutral density of 1 stop + color conversion, the opposite of the 80A; this is a warming filter that takes an outdoor scene lit by sunlight (which has a color temperature around 5500 K) and makes it appear to be lit by tungsten incandescent bulbs around 3400 K. This allows an indoor balanced film to be used to photograph outdoors.
85N6	amber			Neutral density of 2 stops + color conversion, the opposite of the 80A; this is a warming filter that takes an outdoor scene lit by sunlight (which has a color temperature around 5500 K) and makes it appear to be lit by tungsten incandescent bulbs around 3400 K. This allows an indoor balanced film to be used to photograph outdoors.
85N9	amber			Neutral density of 3 stops + color conversion, the opposite of the 80A; this is a warming filter that takes an outdoor scene lit by sunlight (which has a color temperature around 5500 K) and makes it appear to be lit by tungsten incandescent bulbs around 3400 K. This allows an indoor balanced film to be used to photograph outdoors.
Wratten number	Visible color	Filter factor or alternate designation	F‑stops correction	Uses and characteristics
Miscellaneous
87	opaque			Passes infrared but not visible frequencies. Blocks wavelengths shorter than 740 nm
87A	opaque			Passes infrared but not visible frequencies. Blocks wavelengths shorter than 880 nm
87B	opaque			Passes infrared, blocks visible frequencies. Blocks wavelengths shorter than 820 nm
87C	opaque			Passes infrared, blocks visible frequencies. Blocks wavelengths shorter than 790 nm
88	opaque			Passes infrared, blocks visible wavelengths shorter than 700 nm.
88A	opaque			Passes infrared, blocks visible wavelengths shorter than 720 nm.
89B	near-opaque red	R72		Passes infrared, longpass filter blocking visible wavelengths shorter than 690 nm (very deep red). Aerial photography is one use.
90	dark grayish amber			Used for viewing scenes without color, before photographing them, in order to assess the brightness values. Not used for actual photography.
92	red			Color densitometry. Longpass filter blocking visible wavelengths shorter than 625 nm
93	green			Color densitometry.
94	blue			Color densitometry.
96	gray		varies	Neutral density filter. Blocks all frequencies of visible light approximately evenly, making scene darker overall. Available in many different values, distinguished by optical density or by filter factor.
98	blue			Like a #47B plus a #2B filter.
99	green			Like a #61 plus a #16 filter.
102	yellow-green			Color conversion for photometry: Makes a barrier-level type photocell respond as a human eye would.
106	amber			Color conversion for photometry: Makes a type S‑4 photocell respond as a human eye would.

== See also ==
- Filter factor
- Filter (photography)
- Filter (optics)
