= Wratten =

Wratten is a surname. Notable people with the surname include:

- Bill Wratten GBE, CB, AFC (born 1939), Air Officer Commanding-in-Chief of RAF Strike Command from 1994
- Frederick Wratten (1840–1926), English inventor
- Jack Wratten (1906–1996), Progressive Conservative party member of the Canadian House of Commons
- Paul Wratten (born 1970), retired English footballer who played as a midfielder

== See also ==
- Wratten number, labeling system for optical filters, usually for photographic use comprising a number sometimes followed by a letter
