= Photographic filter =

Camera accessory consisting of an optical filter

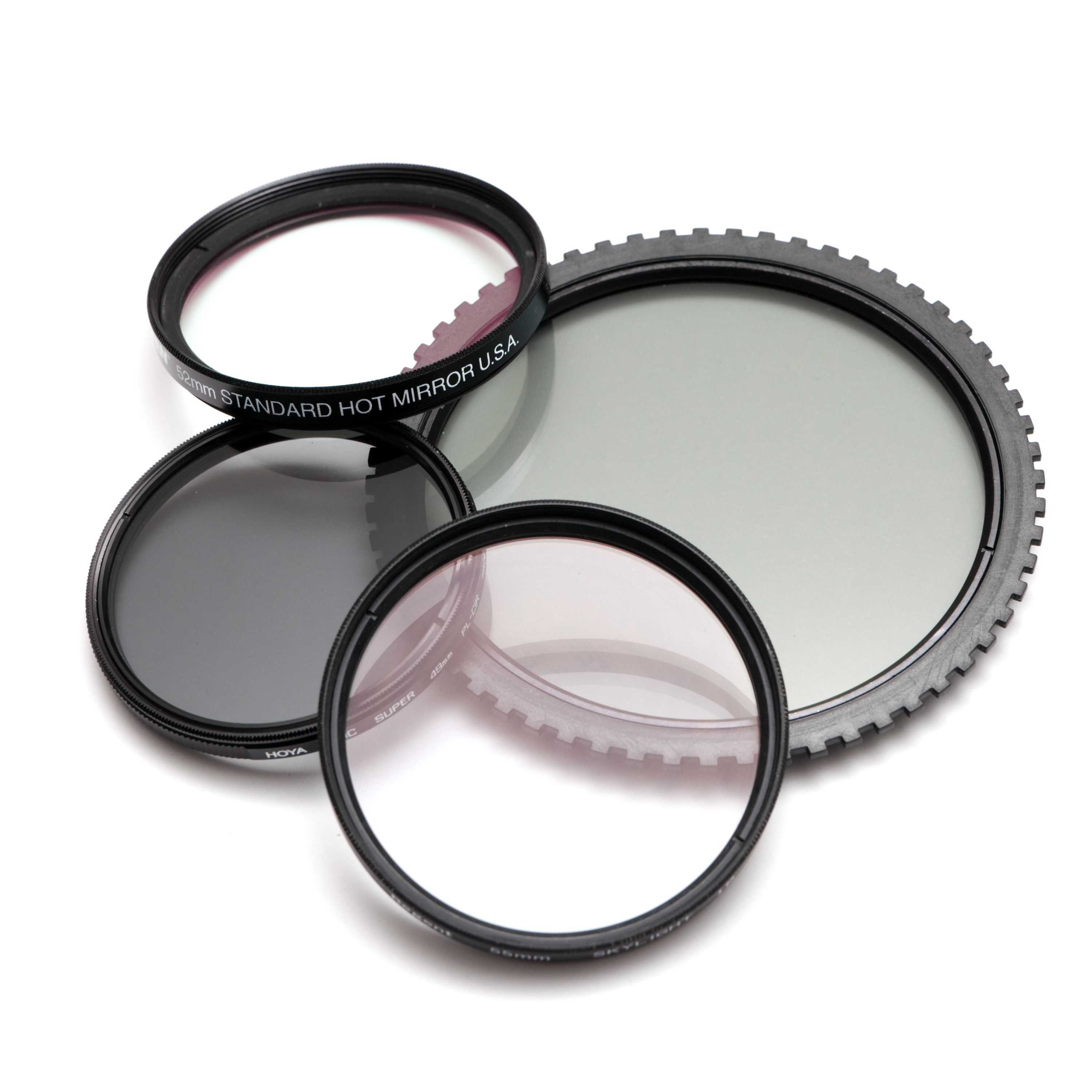
Four photographic filters (clockwise from top-left): an infrared hot mirror filter, a polarizing filter, and a UV filter. The larger filter is a polarizer for Cokin-style filter mounts.

In photography and cinematography, a filter is a camera accessory consisting of an optical filter that can be inserted into the optical path. The filter can be of a square or oblong shape and mounted in a holder accessory, or, more commonly, a glass or plastic disk in a metal or plastic ring frame, which can be screwed into the front of or clipped onto the camera lens.

Filters modify the images recorded. Sometimes they are used to make only subtle changes to images; other times the image would simply not be possible without them. In monochrome photography, coloured filters affect the relative brightness of different colours; red lipstick may be rendered as anything from almost white to almost black with different filters. Others change the colour balance of images, so that photographs under incandescent lighting show colours as they are perceived, rather than with a reddish tinge. There are filters that distort the image in a desired way, diffusing an otherwise sharp image, adding a starry effect, etc. Linear and circular polarising filters reduce oblique reflections from non-metallic surfaces.

== Overview ==
Many filters absorb part of the light available, necessitating longer exposure. As the filter is in the optical path, any imperfections – non-flat or non-parallel surfaces, reflections (minimised by optical coating), scratches, dirt – affect the image.

In digital photography the majority of filters used with film cameras have been rendered redundant by digital filters applied either in-camera or during post processing. Exceptions include the ultraviolet (UV) filter typically used to protect the front surface of the lens, the neutral density (ND) filter, the polarising filter, color-enhancing filters, and the infrared (IR) filter. The neutral density filter permits effects requiring wide apertures or long exposures to be applied to brightly lit scenes, while the graduated neutral density filter is useful in situations where the scene's dynamic range exceeds the capability of the sensor. Not using optical filters in front of the lens has the advantage of avoiding the reduction of image quality caused by the presence of an extra optical element in the light path and may be necessary to avoid vignetting when using wide-angle lenses.

=== Nomenclature ===
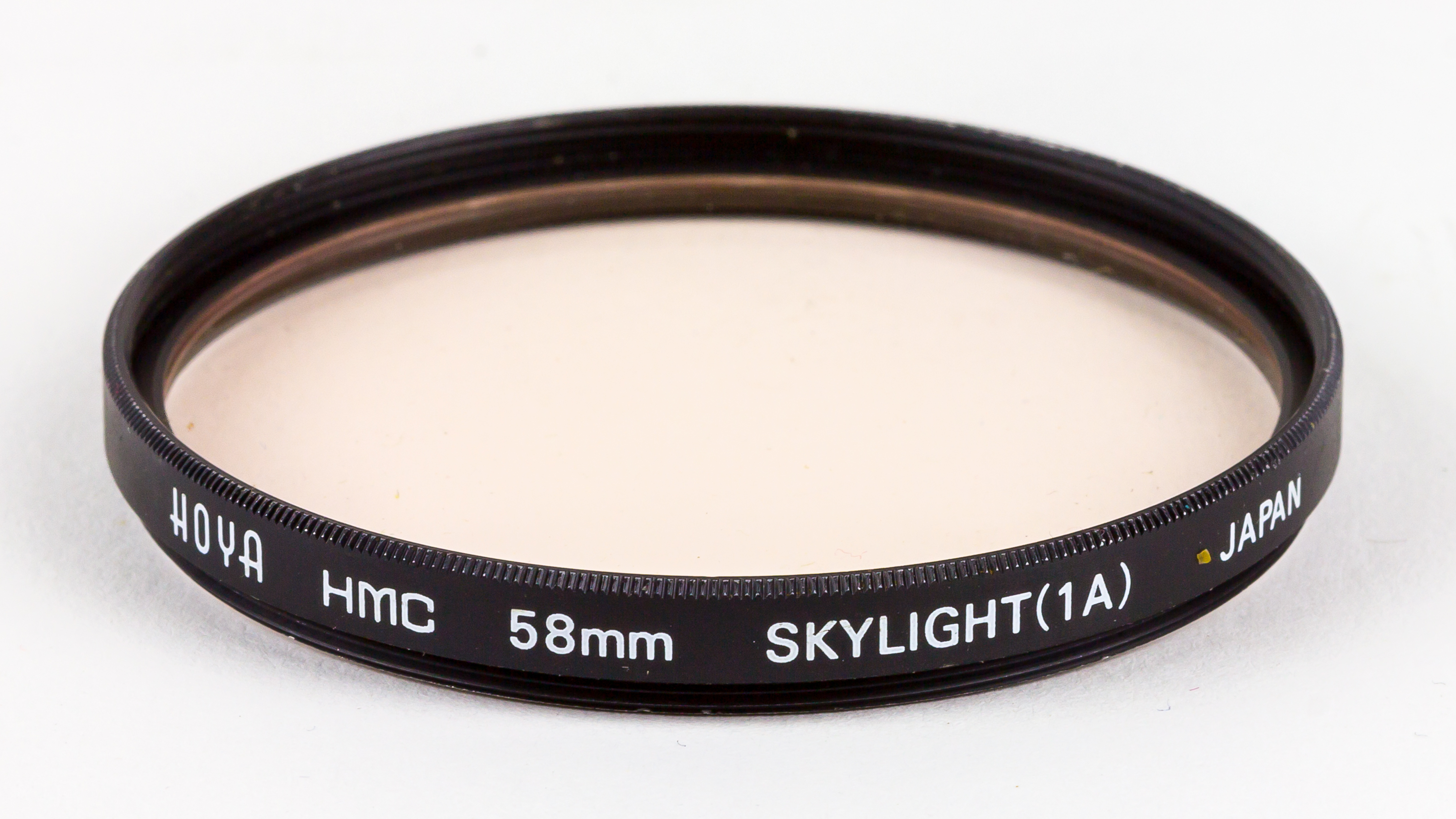
Markings on Hoya multicoated skylight filter, identifying size and equivalent Wratten number (1A)

There is no universal or reliably standard naming or labelling system for filters. The Wratten numbers adopted in the early twentieth century by Kodak, then a dominant force in film photography, are used by several manufacturers, including B+W, but the actual spectral characteristics of a filter may vary by manufacturer, despite having the same Wratten number. In addition, the Wratten numbers are sometimes used interchangeably with alternative names; for example, the Wratten filter number 6 is also named K1, while #11 is also named X1.

Spectral transmission by visible wavelength for Nikon UV (L39) and color filters (X0, X1, Y44, Y48, Y52, O56, R60)

Some manufacturers use a combination of Wratten numbers and wavelengths to identify filters. For example, Nikon offers four UV / skylight filters: L1A, L1B, L37, and L39; the L1A and L1B correspond to Wratten numbers 1A and 1B, while L37 and L39 include the wavelength cutoffs of 370 nm and 390 nm, respectively. Colored filters used to enhance contrast for black and white photography include a letter (Y, O, or R) and a similar wavelength cutoff: for example, R60 is a red filter with a step-like transmission function at 600 nm. For other filters, the alternate Wratten name is used (for example, X0 and X1 for green filters).

Many colour correction filters are identified by a code of the form CCaab, for example, CC50Y:

- CC = type (for colour correction)
- aa = strength or density of the filter (50 = 50%)
- b = color (in this case, Y for yellow)

While the same information may be present, the specific sequence of colour and density may vary by manufacturer.

== Scientific uses ==
Optical filters are used in various areas of science, including in particular astronomy; photographic filters are roughly the same as "optical" filters, but in practice optical filters often need far more accurately controlled optical properties and precisely defined transmission curves than filters only made for general photography. Photographic filters sell in larger quantities, at correspondingly lower prices, than many laboratory filters. The article on optical filters has information relevant to photographic filters, particularly special-purpose photographic filters like color enhancing filters and high-quality photographic filters, like sharp cut-off UV filters.

== Photographic uses ==
Transmission characteristics of three color conversion filters: Wratten #80 (blue line), #85 (orange line), and #85B (red line)

Filters in photography can be classified according to their visible color and use:

- Colorless / Neutral
  - Clear and ultraviolet
  - Infrared
  - Polarizing
  - Neutral density, including the graduated neutral density filter and solar filter
- Color
  - Color conversion (or color balance)
  - Color correction
  - Color separation, also called color subtraction
  - Contrast enhancement
- Special effects of various kinds, including
  - Graduated color, called color grads
  - Cross screen and star diffractors
  - Diffusion and contrast reduction
  - Close-up or macro diopters, and split diopters or split focus
  - Multi-image
  - Spot

=== Colorless / Neutral ===
==== Clear and ultraviolet ====
Clear filters, also known as window glass filters or optical flats, are transparent and (ideally) perform no filtering of incoming light. The only use of a clear filter is to protect the front of a lens.

Clear glass will absorb some UV.

UV filters are used to block invisible ultraviolet light, to which most photographic sensors and film are at least slightly sensitive. The UV is typically recorded as if it were blue light, so this non-human UV sensitivity can result in an unwanted exaggeration of the bluish tint of atmospheric haze or, even more unnaturally, of subjects in open shade lit by the ultraviolet-rich sky.

Normally, the glass or plastic of a camera lens is practically opaque to short-wavelength UV, but transparent to long-wavelength (near-visible) UV. A UV filter passes all or nearly all of the visible spectrum but blocks virtually all ultraviolet radiation. (Most spectral manipulation filters are named for the radiation they pass; green and infrared filters pass their named colors, but a UV filter blocks UV.) It can be left on the lens for nearly all shots: UV filters are often used mainly for lens protection in the same way as clear filters. A strong UV filter, such as a Haze-2A or UV17, cuts off some visible light in the violet part of the spectrum, and has a pale yellow color; these strong filters are more effective at cutting haze, reduce purple fringing in digital cameras, and can subtly darken pale blue skies – which improves contrast between sky and clouds. Strong UV filters are also sometimes used for warming color photos taken in shade with daylight-type film. They were originally developed to increase contrast in airborne surveillance photography, and were adopted by mountaineering photographers to remedy the strong UV at high altitude.

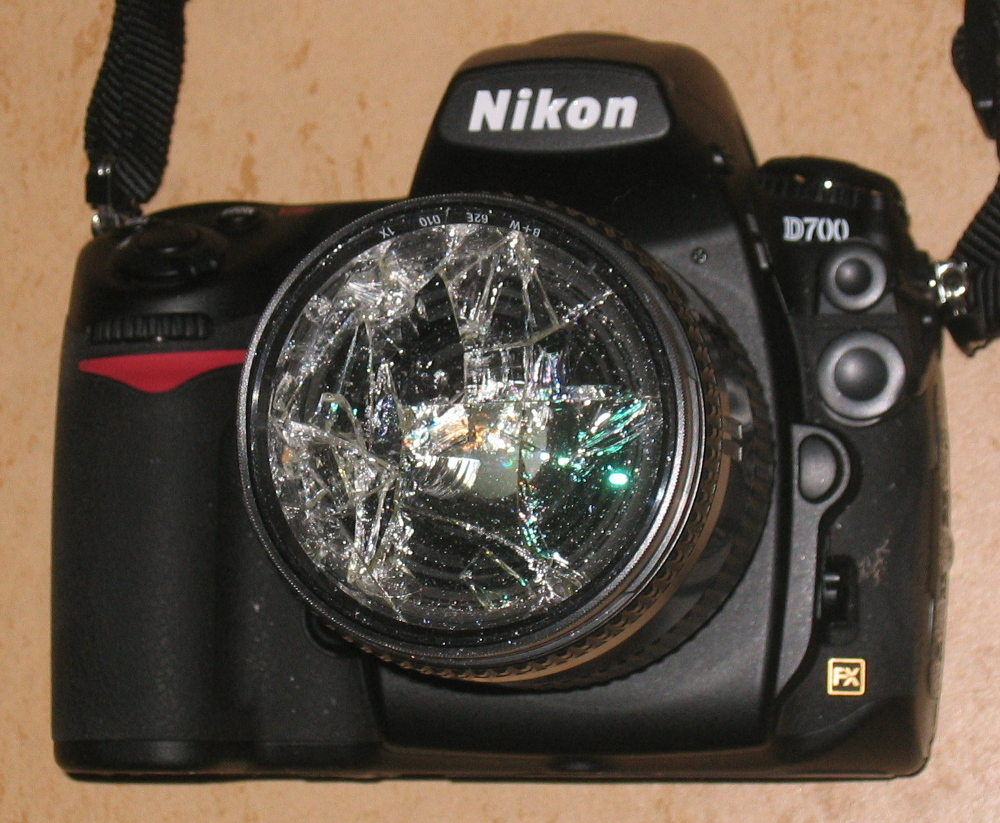
An extreme case: a Nikon D700 with a smashed filter which may have saved the Nikkor lens beneath. Usually, all that can reasonably be expected is protection from scratches, nicks and airborne contaminants.

While in certain cases, such as harsh environments, a protection filter may be necessary, there are also downsides to this practice. Arguments for the use of protection filters include:

- If the lens is dropped, the filter may well suffer scratches or breakage instead of the front lens element.
- The filter can be cleaned frequently without damage to the lens surface or coatings; a filter scratched by cleaning is much less expensive to replace than a lens.
- If there is blowing sand the filter will protect the front of the lens from abrasion and nicks.
- A few lenses, such as some of Canon's L series lenses, require the use of a filter to complete their weather sealing.

Arguments against their use include:

- Adding another element may degrade image quality if its surfaces are less than perfectly flat and parallel. Filters from reputable makers are very unlikely to cause any problems, but some "bargain" products are optically inferior.
- The two additional reflections at air-glass interfaces inevitably result in some light loss – at least four percent at each interface, if the surfaces are uncoated; they also increase the potential for lens flare problems.
- Low-quality filters may cause problems with autofocus.
- A filter may be incompatible with the use of a lens hood, since not all filters have the required threading for a screw-in hood or will allow a clip-on hood to be attached. Adding a lens hood on top of one or more filters may space the hood away from the lens enough to cause some vignetting.

There is a wide variation in the spectral UV blocking by filters described as ultraviolet.

==== Infrared ====
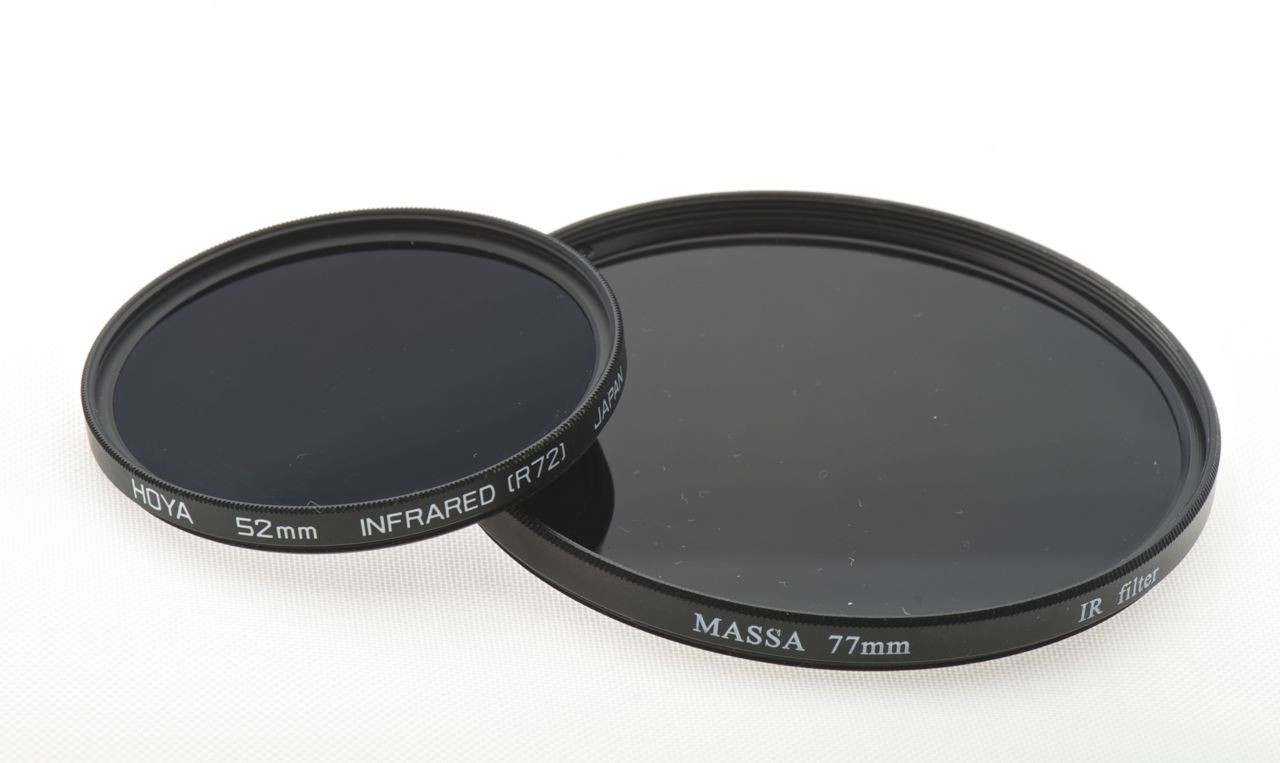
Infrared filters

Wratten IR filters
| No. | 50% (nm) (Note: The approximate transition wavelength where the filter achieves 50% transmission; longer wavelengths are passed, while lower wavelengths are absorbed.) |
|---|---|
| 15 | 530 |
| 21 | 560 |
| 23A | 580 |
| 25 | 600 |
| 29 | 620 |
| 70 | 675 |
| 89B | 720 |
| 88 | 735 |
| 72B | 740 |
| 88A | 750 |
| 87 | 795 |
| 87C | 850 |
| 87B | 930 |
| 87A | 1050 |

Unlike ultraviolet filters, which are suitable for general photography as they are designed to attenuate shorter ultraviolet wavelengths and pass visible wavelengths, filters for infrared photography are designed to block portions of the visible spectrum while passing longer wavelengths of light in the infrared spectrum, and hence they may appear dark red to black in color.

Historically, the Wratten number has been used to describe the spectral absorption characteristics of filters used with infrared photography. Common types include filters in the Wratten #87, 88, and 89 series; since Wratten numbers were assigned sequentially, there is no consistent logic (for instance, the #89B filter has a transition wavelength where the filter achieves 50% transmittance at approximately 720 nm, while #87 has its transition wavelength at approximately 795 nm. Because black-and-white infrared film retains significant sensitivity to blue wavelengths, sometimes red and orange filters are used to decrease contrast.

Other manufacturers may embed the transition wavelength in the name of the filter. For example, the Hoya R72 (720 nm) and RM90 (900 nm) are intended for infrared photography, corresponding to Wratten No. 89B and 87B, respectively. For use with color infrared film, some manufacturers advise filters which restrict blue and green visible wavelengths, but pass most of the red spectrum, with a transition wavelength around 550 nm.

==== Polarizer ====
Effect of polarizing filter

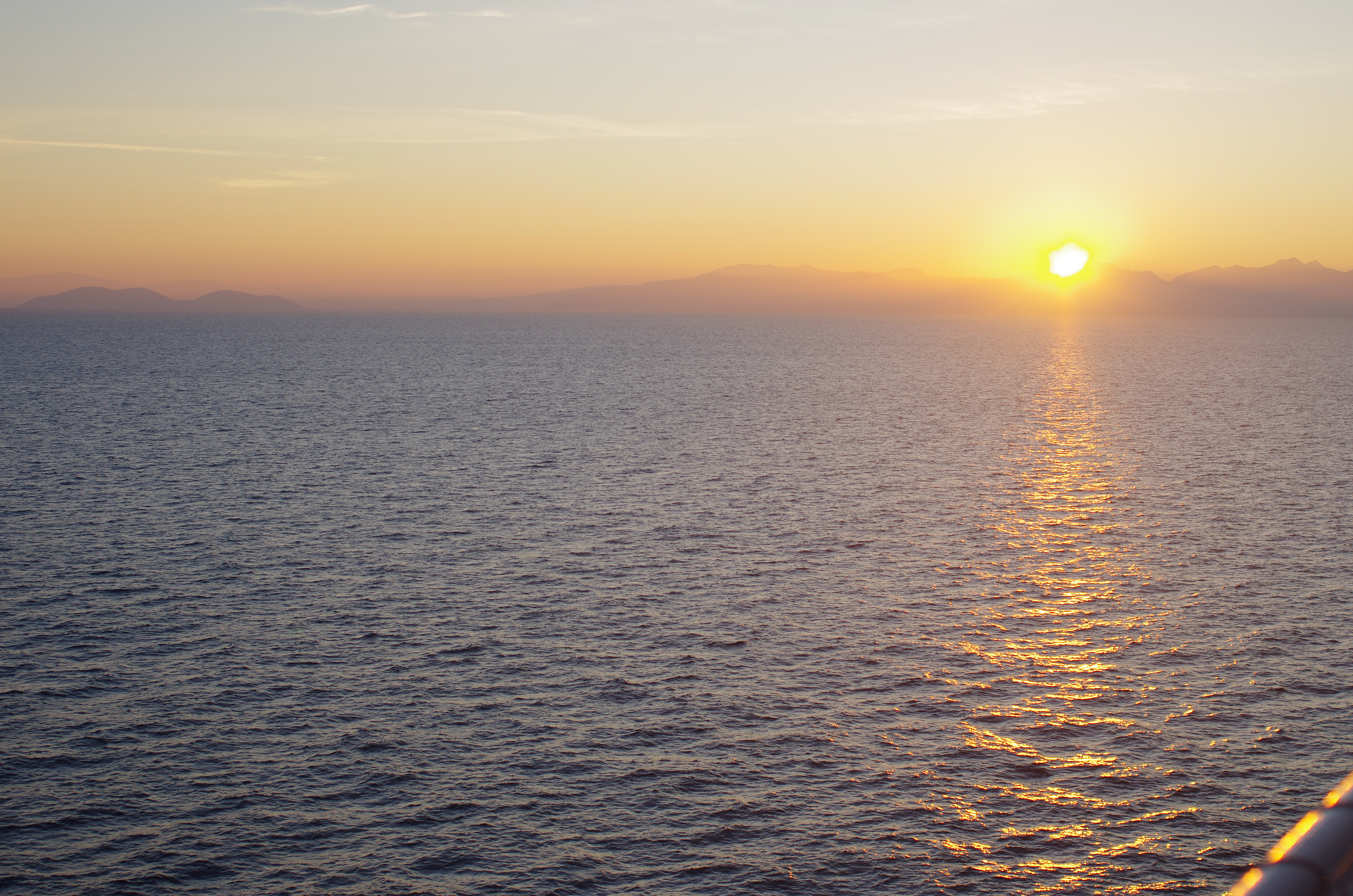
Without

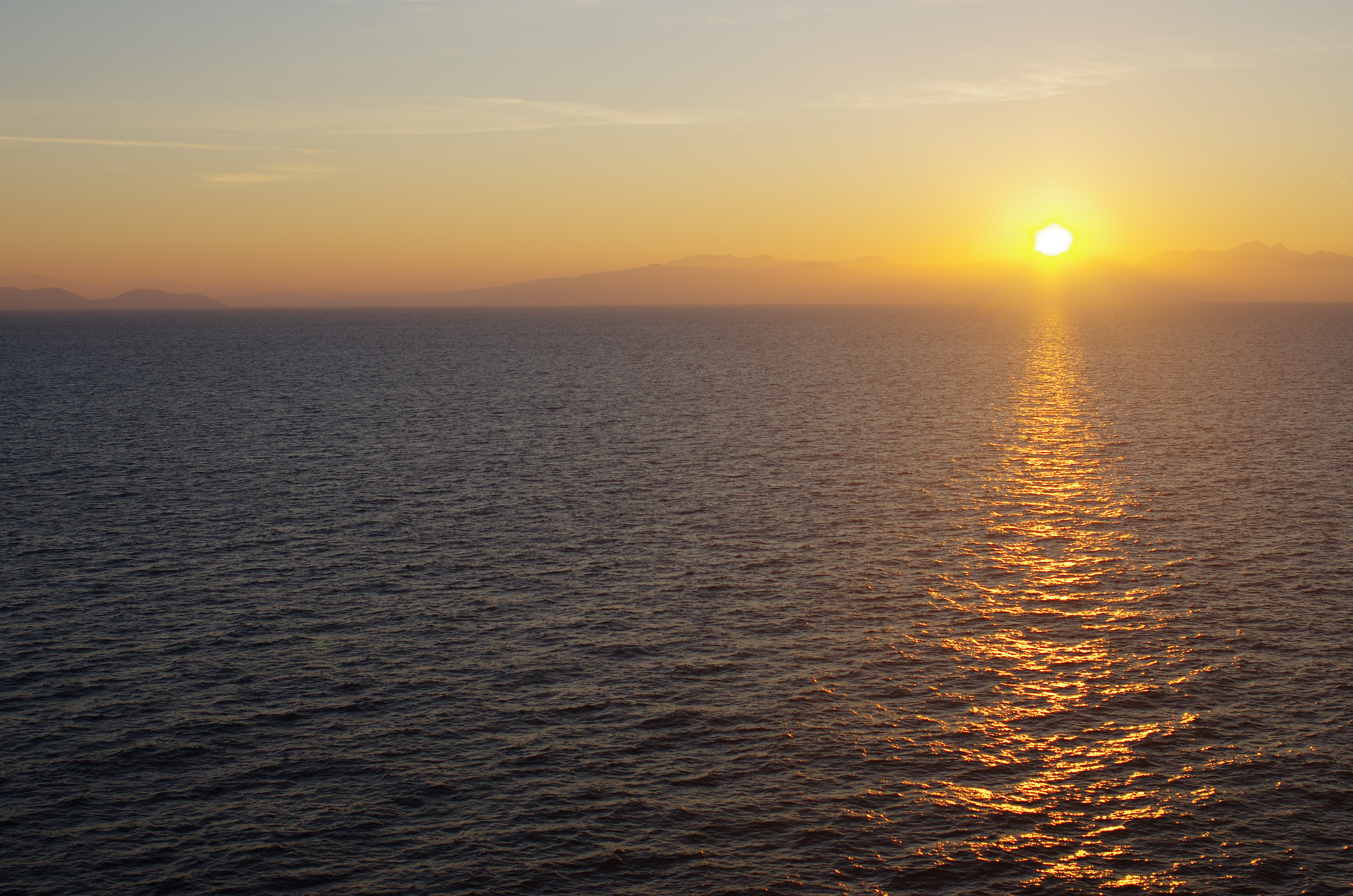
With

Polarizing filter used to reduce reflection from water

A polarizing filter, used for both color and black-and-white photography, is colourless and does not affect colour balance, but filters out light with a particular direction of polarisation. This reduces oblique reflections from non-metallic surfaces, can darken the sky in colour photography (in monochrome photography colour filters are more effective), and can saturate the image more by eliminating unwanted reflections.

Linear polarising filters, while effective, can interfere with metering and auto-focus mechanisms when mirrors or beam-splitters are in the light path, as in the digital single lens reflex camera; a circular polarizer is also effective, and does not affect metering or auto-focus.

==== Neutral density ====
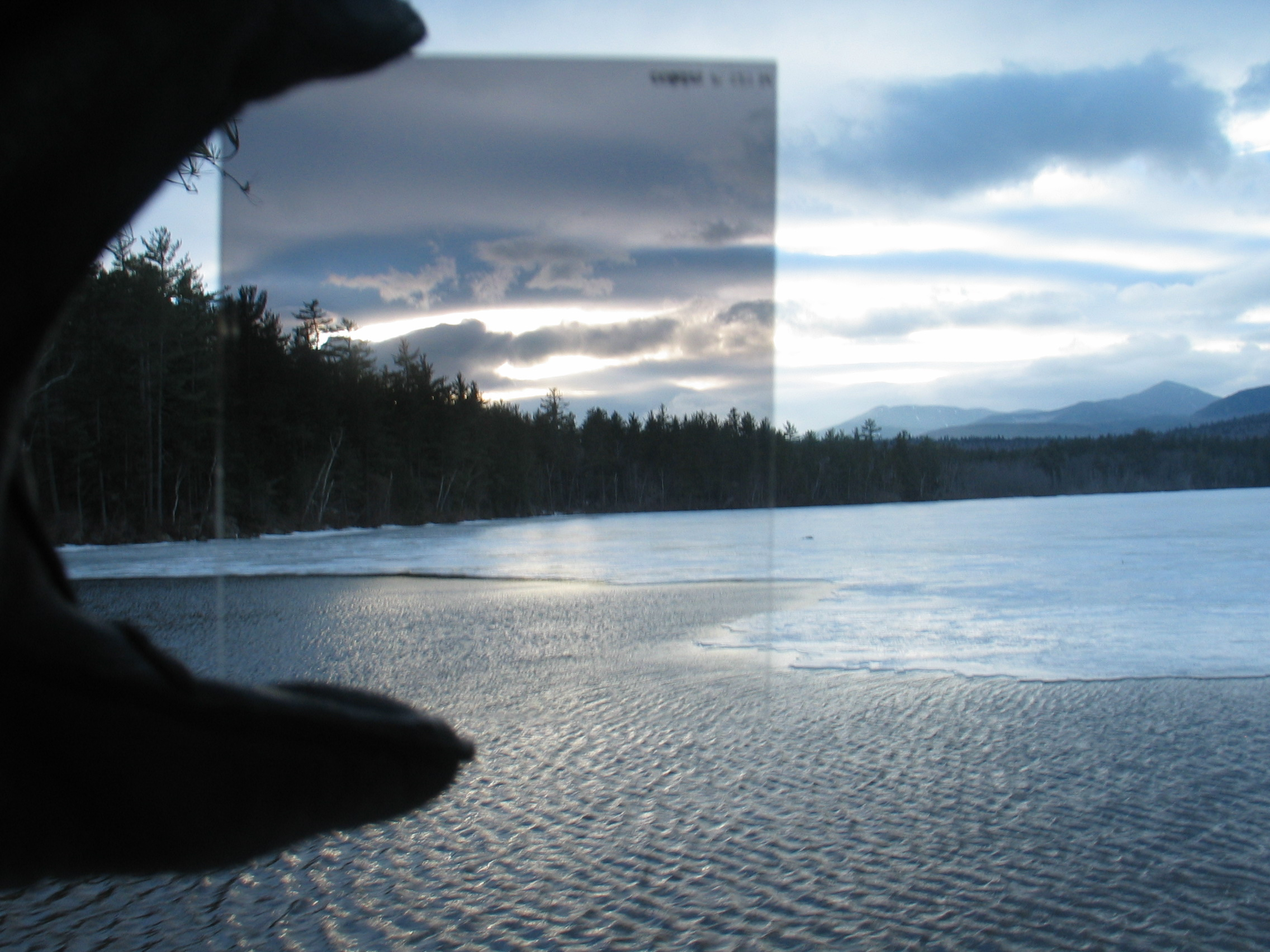
This handheld graduated neutral density filter demonstrates selective attenuation for the sky

A neutral density filter (ND filter) is a filter of uniform density which attenuates light of all colors equally. It is used to allow a longer exposure (to create blur) or larger aperture (for selective focus) than otherwise required for correct exposure in the prevailing light conditions, without changing the tonal balance of the photograph.

A graduated neutral density filter is a neutral density filter with different attenuation at different points, typically clear in one half shading into a higher density in the other. It can be used, for example, to photograph a scene with part in deep shadow and part brightly lit, where otherwise either the shadows would have no detail or the highlights would be burnt out.

=== Color filters ===
==== Color conversion ====
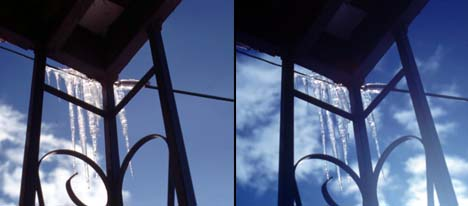
The 80A filter, mainly used to correct for the excessive redness of incandescent light bulbs, can also be used to oversaturate scenes that already have blue. The photo on the left was shot with a polarizer, while the one on the right was shot with a polarizer and an 80A filter.

Appropriate color conversion filters are used to compensate for colour casts caused by lighting not balanced for the film stock's rated color temperature, which is usually 3200–3400 K for use with professional incandescent light sources (Note: Professional "tungsten lighting" is also called photoflood lighting. Historically, there were two films balanced for tungsten lighting, Type A (3200 K) and Type B (3400 K).) and 5500–5700 K for daylight. Color conversion filters attenuate a range of visible wavelengths to shift the perceived color temperature. The need for these filters has been greatly reduced by the widespread adoption of digital photography, since color balance may be corrected with camera settings as the image is captured, or by software manipulation afterwards.

These color conversion filters are identified by non-standardised numbers which vary from manufacturer to manufacturer. Many filter manufacturers use the Wratten number or make reference to it. The Wratten numbers were assigned sequentially as applications were created (80x and 82x for blue cooling filters, 81x and 85x for amber warming filters), so there is no systematic logic that ties the number to its effect: for example, the 80A filter has the strongest "cooling" effect, followed by the 80B, and both are stronger than the 82C, which is stronger in turn than the 82B. The 80/85 series are regarded as "color conversion" filters, while the corresponding 82/81 series are "light balancing filters" which generally have a weaker effect than the 80/85 series. Typically, the 80A blue filter used with film for daylight use corrects the perceived orange/reddish cast of incandescent photographic photoflood lights, and significantly improves the stronger cast produced by lower-temperature household incandescent lighting, while the 85B amber filter will correct the bluish cast of daylight photographs on tungsten film.

Nomogram to compute mired shift; light source is on the top scale, while film is on the bottom scale.

To avoid confusion and to assist photographers in selecting the appropriate filter, some manufacturers, including B+W, Rodenstock, and Hoya, include or use the mired shift to name their filters, which quantifies the effect of a color conversion filter. The mired value associated with a given color temperature is computed as the reciprocal of the color temperature, in Kelvin, multiplied by $10^6$:

$M = \frac{{10}^{6}}{T}$

The shift is the difference in the mired values of the film and light source. Sometimes the decamired is used, where 10 mired = 1 decamired, as the smallest perceptible color temperature change is from a 10 mired shift.

$\Delta M = M_{film} - M_{light} = \frac{{10}^{6}}{T_{film}} - \frac{{10}^{6}}{T_{light}}$

Warming filters
| $\Delta M$ | Wratten |
|---|---|
| +10 | 81 |
| +20 | 81A |
| +30 | 81B, 81C |
| +40 | 81D |
| +50 | 81EF |
| +60 | |
| +70 | |
| +80 | 85C |
| +90 | |
| +100 | |
| +110 | 85 |
| +120 | |
| +130 | 85B |

Cooling filters
| $\Delta M$ | Wratten |
|---|---|
| -130 | 80A |
| -120 | |
| -110 | 80B |
| -100 | |
| -90 | |
| -80 | 80C |
| -70 | |
| -60 | 80D |
| -50 | 82C |
| -40 | |
| -30 | 82B |
| -20 | 82A |
| -10 | 82 |

From the equation, when the film has a higher color temperature than the light source, a negative mired shift is required, which calls for a "cooling" filter; these have a perceptible blue color, and the more saturated the color, the stronger the cooling effect. Likewise, when the film has a lower color temperature than the light source, a positive mired shift is required, which calls for an amber "warming" filter.

Stacking color conversion filters creates an additive mired shift: for example, stacking a Wratten 80A (-130 mired) with a Wratten 82C (-60 mired) results in a total mired shift of -190. A typical set of color conversion filters has a geometric sequence, e.g. ±15, ±30, ±60, and ±120 mired, which corresponds approximately to the pattern of the Wratten filters, and allows intermediate values to be obtained by stacking.

Mired shift and required filter(s) for typical situations
| Film type Light source | | Tungsten | Daylight |
|---|---|---|---|
| Film type Light source | | 3200 K | 5700 K |
| "Warm white" incandescent | 2700 K | -60 mired Wratten 80D | -190 mired 80A+80D |
| Professional tungsten | 3200 K | —N/a | -140 mired Wratten 80A |
| Metal halide, "cool white" incandescent | 4200 K | 70 mired Wratten 81EF | -60 mired Wratten 80D |
| Daylight | 5700 K | 140 mired Wratten 85B | —N/a |
| Electronic flash | 6500 K | 160 mired 85B+81B | 20 mired 81A |
| Open shade | 10000 K | 210 mired 85B+85C | 80 mired 85C |

==== Color correction ====
Color conversion and light balancing (LB) filters must be distinguished from color correction filters (CC filters), which filter out a particular color cast that may have various causes, including reflections from colored surfaces, fluorescent lighting (which has an unbalanced spectrum), underwater photography, or the Schwarzschild effect (also known as reciprocity failure).

In general, CC filters are supplied in densities varying between 5 and 50% in primary colors, both additive (red, green, and blue) and subtractive (cyan, magenta, and yellow). They may be used for graphic effect or to compensate for differences in color balance between film batches for critical work. Fluorescent filters generally have a magenta hue, selectively absorbing excessive green light, and have a name which includes the letters FL, such as FL-D for use with daylight balanced film.

==== Color subtraction ====
Color subtraction filters work by absorbing certain colors of light, letting the remaining colors through. They can be used to demonstrate the primary colors that make up an image. They are perhaps most frequently used in the printing industry for color separations, and again, use has diminished as digital solutions have become more advanced and abundant.

Didymium filters, sold as "color enhancement" or "fall color" filters act similarly: They remove a narrow (or broad) band of color in the yellow part of the spectrum (589 nm). (Note: The loss of some of the yellow light does not greatly affect humans' or cameras' ability perceive yellow colors, but does provide better color separation between shades of red, orange, and green. The greens look greener, the reds look redder, the oranges look redder, browns acquire a reddish tinge, and the yellows dim slightly. The net effect is to make the colors of autumn leaves 'pop'. Looking through a didymium filter at a familiar human environment makes many colors appear gaudy or cartoonish. Some filter manufacturers add light color-correction coatings to help preserve white balance, or heavier coatings to exaggerate some colors (e.g. "green enhancing"). The yellow-blocking material used didymium is actually a naturally occurring mixture of two rare earths; by adjusting the mix of praseodymium and neodymium, and the amount of both in the glass, different degrees and intensities of color effects can be produced. Hence, different manufacturers' "color enhancement" filters can produce subtle through to garish effects. As an example of manipulating the didymium mixture and amount, 'light pollution filters' used in amateur astronomy use a particularly heavy dose of didymium in the glass, in order to completely block parts of the spectrum typically dominated by light pollution from sodium-vapor lamps and mercury vapor lighting, while leaving colors of dim astronomical objects visible to the dark-adapted eye largely unaffected.) Some astronomical filters similarly use didymium in heavier concentration. Even astronomical filters which don't use didymium typically are some kind of narrow pass-band color filter.

==== Contrast enhancement ====
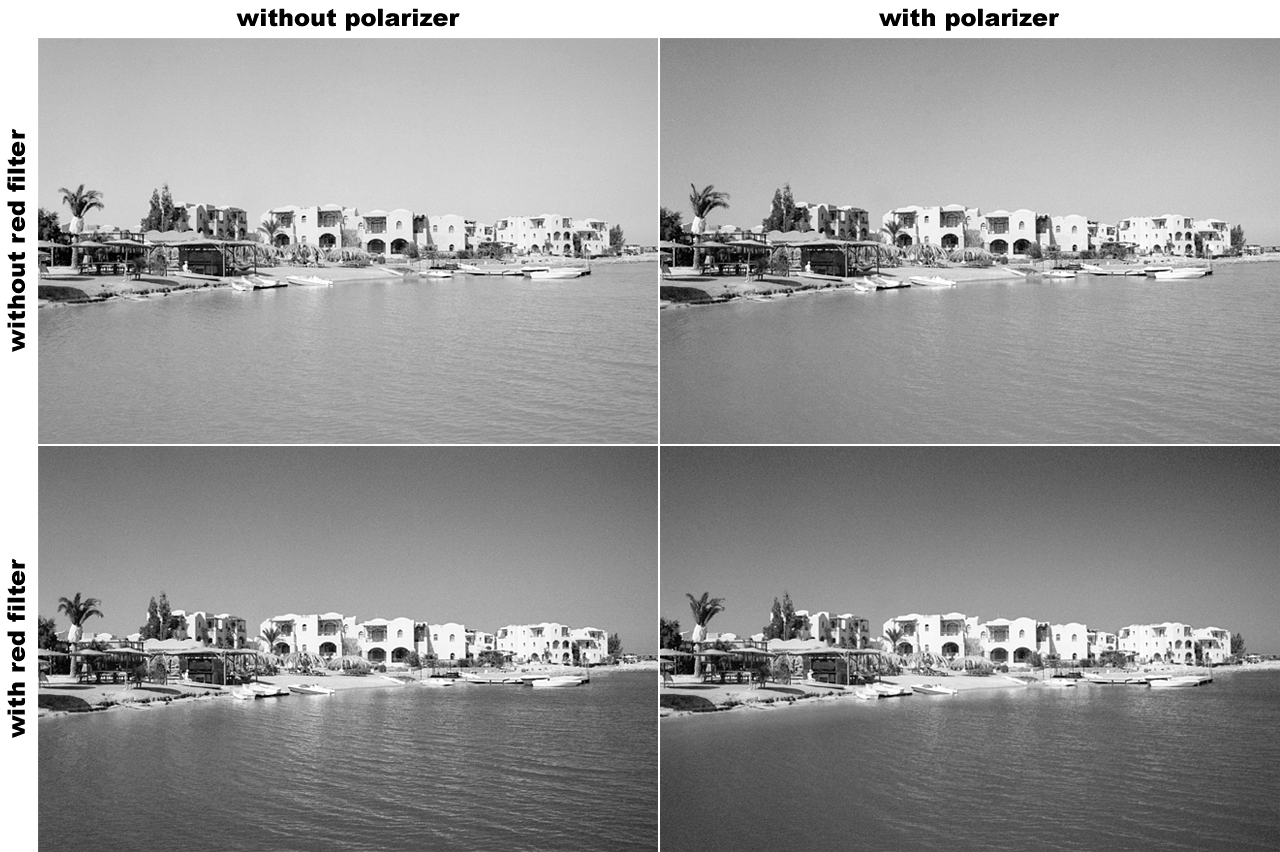
Effects of using a polarizer and a red filter in black-and-white photography

Colored filters are commonly used in black and white photography to alter the effect of different colors in the scene, changing contrast recorded in black and white of the different colours. The standard rule-of-thumb is a colored filter will selectively lighten its color, while darkening other colors, especially the complementary color, as the filter passes that color while attenuating others.

For example, a yellow filter or, more dramatically, an orange or red filter, will enhance the contrast between clouds and sky by darkening the blue sky while leaving the clouds bright (after exposure compensation). A deep green filter will also darken the sky, and additionally lighten green foliage, making it stand out against the sky. Light yellowish-green filters were used as standard portrait filters for panchromatic film, since they render skin-tones as light to dark grey, while darkening deep reds and blues to nearly black.

Black and white simulations with color contrast filters
| Filter | Example 1 (still life) | | Example 2 (landscape) | | Example 3 (portrait) | | Notes |
| Filter | Color | B&W | Color | B&W | Color | B&W | Notes |
|---|---|---|---|---|---|---|---|
| (none) | | | | | | | Black and white simulated by converting to luminance values only. |
| Red | | | | | | | Red filter tends to darken blue and green objects while lightening red and orange subjects. |
| Orange | | | | | | | Similar effects as red filter, but not as strong. |
| Yellow | | | | | | | Yellow filter is generally used to neutralize atmospheric haze. |
| Green | | | | | | | Used to differentiate green tones. |
| Cyan | | | | | | | Simulates effect of orthochromatic film |
| Blue | | | | | | | Blue filter tends to accentuate haze and lighten skies. |
| Magenta | | | | | | | Not generally used; included for completeness |

A sky-blue filter (cyan) mimics the effect of older orthochromatic film – or with a "true blue" filter, even older film only sensitive to blue light – rendering blue as light and red and green as dark, showing blue skies the same as overcast, with no contrast between sky and clouds, darkening blond hair, making blue eyes nearly white, and red lips nearly black.

Diffusion filters have the opposite, contrast-reducing effect; in addition they "soften" focus, making small blemishes invisible.

=== Special effects ===
==== Cross ====
A cross screen filter, also known as a star filter, creates a star pattern, in which lines radiate outward from bright objects. The star pattern is generated by a very fine diffraction grating embedded in the filter, or sometimes by the use of prisms in the filter. The number of stars varies by the construction of the filter, as does the number of points each star has. The pattern of the diffraction grating can affect the shape of the resulting highlights as well.

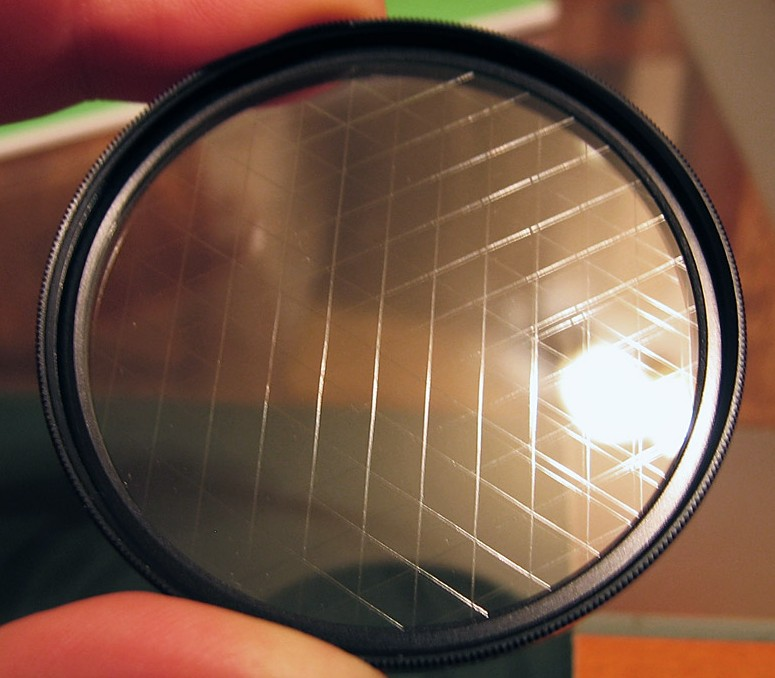
A cross-screen photo filter

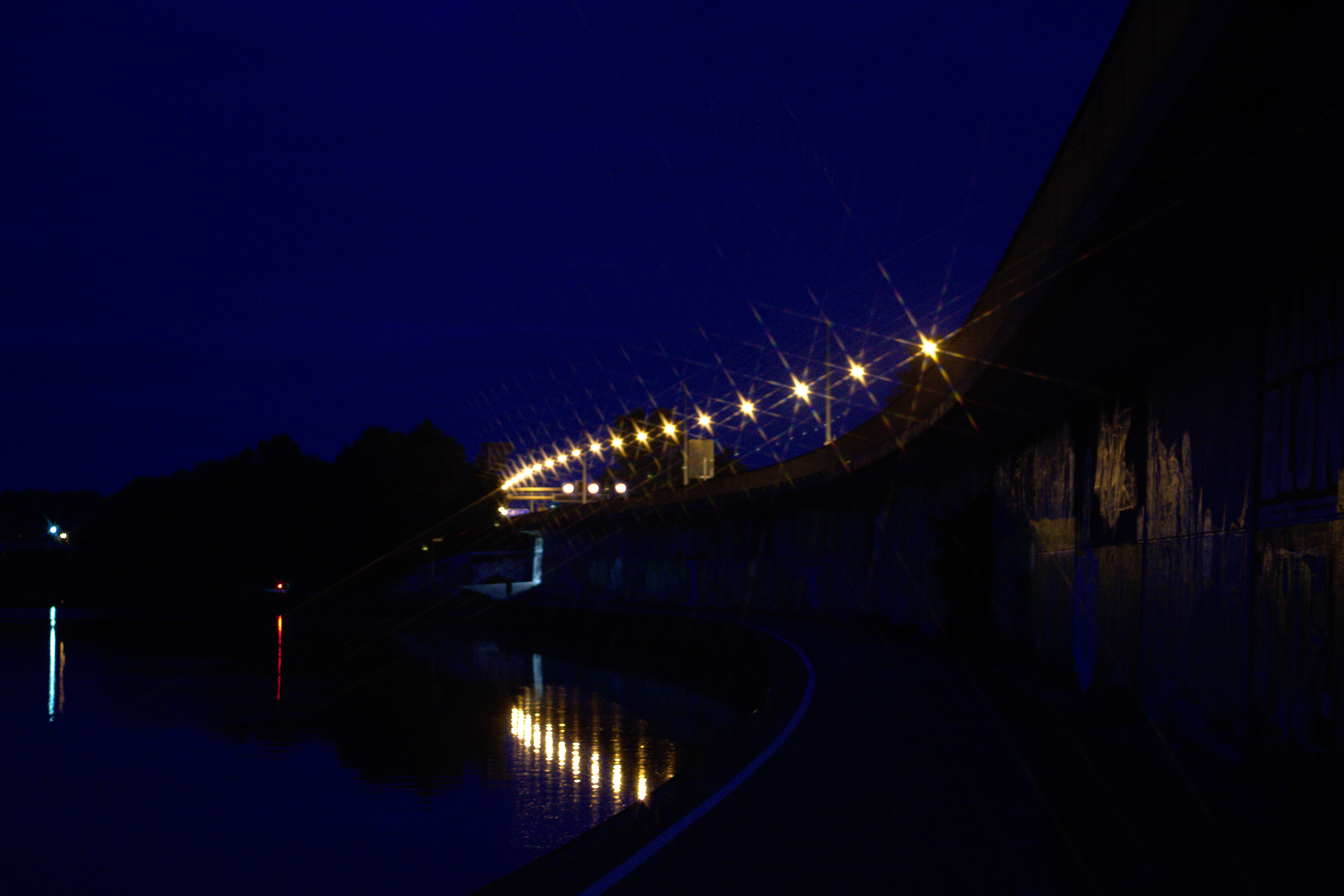
A picture taken with cross-screen filter

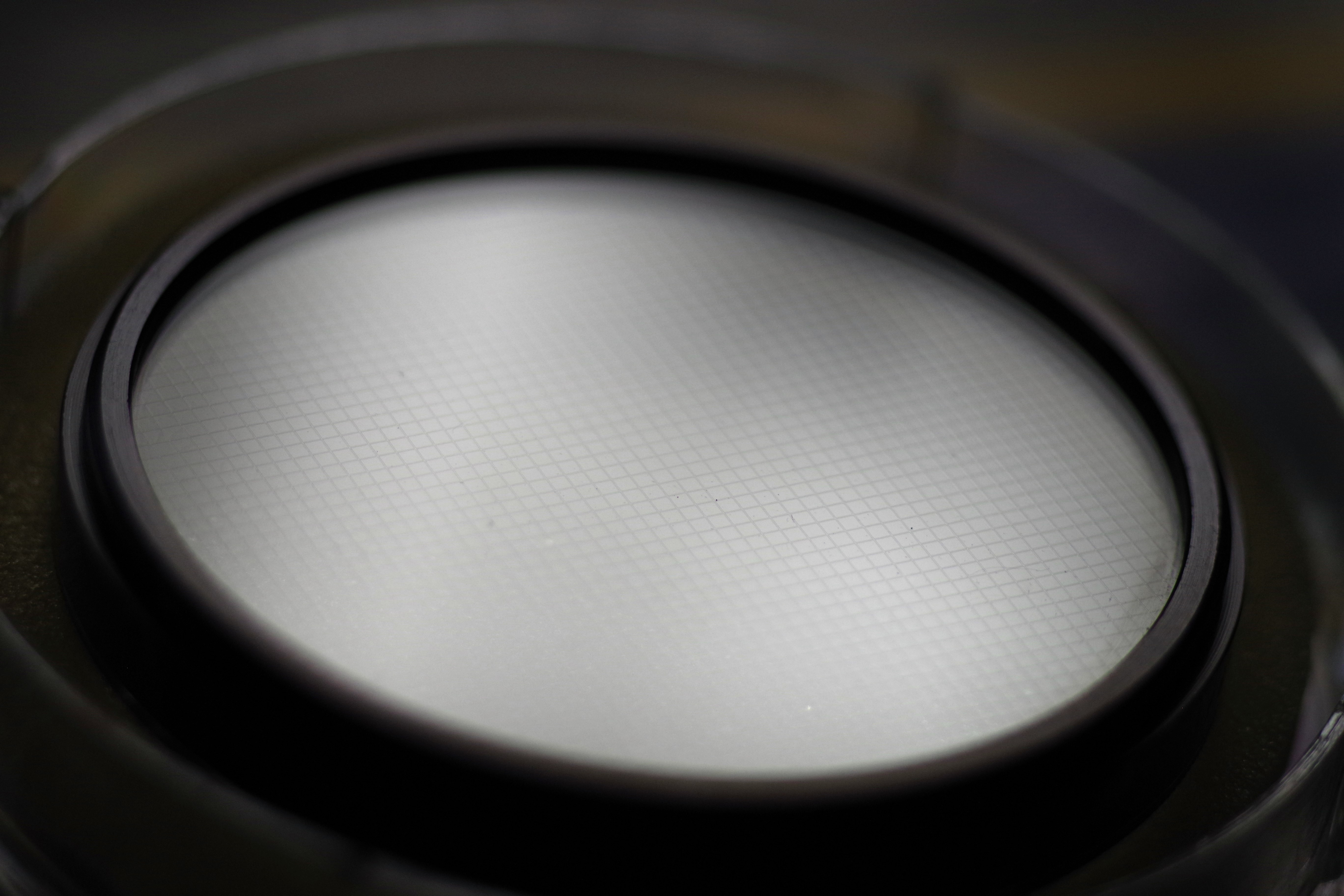
Another star filter

==== Diffusion ====
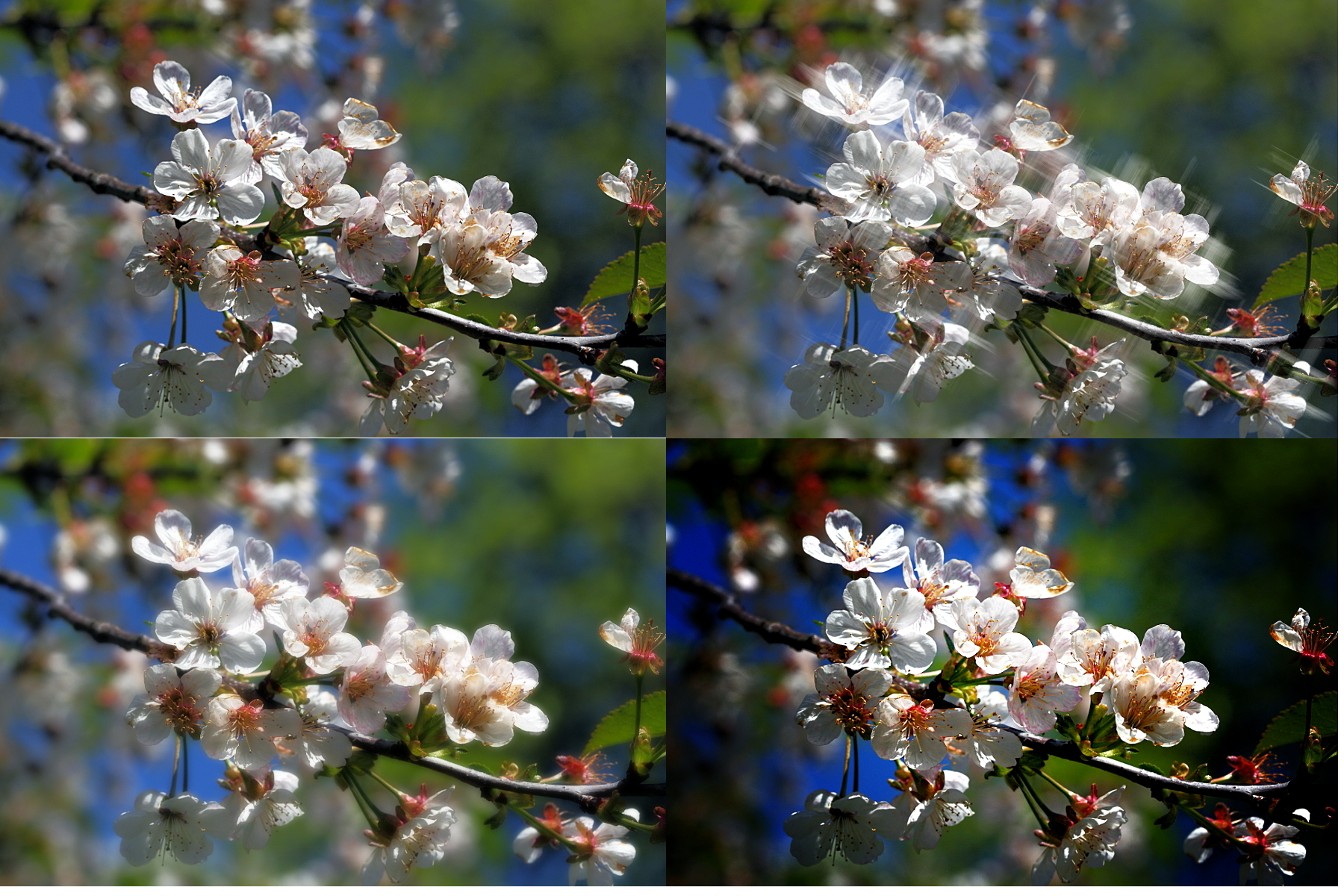
Filter effects applied to the original (top left) image through post-processing using the FX Foundry plug-in for GIMP. The bottom left image has a diffusion filter effect applied. The top right is a cross screen effect. The bottom right shows a LOMO (Note: The LOMO effect imitates photos made with a low-cost Russian camera brand, named "LOMO". It is approximated by saturated central colors, blurred periphery, and darkened corners and edges (vignetting).) effect.

A diffusion filter (also called a softening filter) softens subjects and generates a dreamy haze (see photon diffusion). This is most often used for portraits, providing an effect similar to that of a dedicated soft focus lens. It also has the effect of reducing contrast, and the filters are designed, labeled, sold, and used for that purpose too. There are many ways of accomplishing this effect, and thus filters from different manufacturers vary significantly. The two primary approaches are to use some form of grid or netting in the filter, or to use something which is transparent but not optically sharp.

Both effects can be achieved in software, which can in principle provide a very precise degree of control of the level of effect, however the "look" may be noticeably different. If there is too much contrast in a scene, the dynamic range of the digital image sensor or film may be exceeded, which post-processing cannot compensate for, so contrast reduction at the time of image capture may be called for.

==== Close-up and split diopter lenses ====
A close-up lens is not technically a filter but accessory lens which attaches to a lens like a filter, hence the alternative but misleading term "close-up filter". They are often sold by filter manufacturers as part of their product lines, using the same holders and attachment systems. A close-up lens is a single or two-element converging lens used for close-up and macro photography, and works in the same way as spectacles used for reading. The insertion of a converging lens in front of the taking lens reduces the focal length of the combination.

Close-up lenses are usually specified by their optical power, the reciprocal of the focal length in meters. Several close-up lenses may be used in combination; the optical power of the combination is the sum of the optical powers of the component lenses; a set of lenses of +1, +2, and +4 diopters can be combined to provide a range from +1 to +7 in steps of one.

A split diopter has just a semicircular half of a close-up lens in a normal filter holder. It can be used to photograph a close object and a much more distant background, with everything in sharp focus; with any non-split lens the depth of field would be far too shallow.

==== Multi-image ====
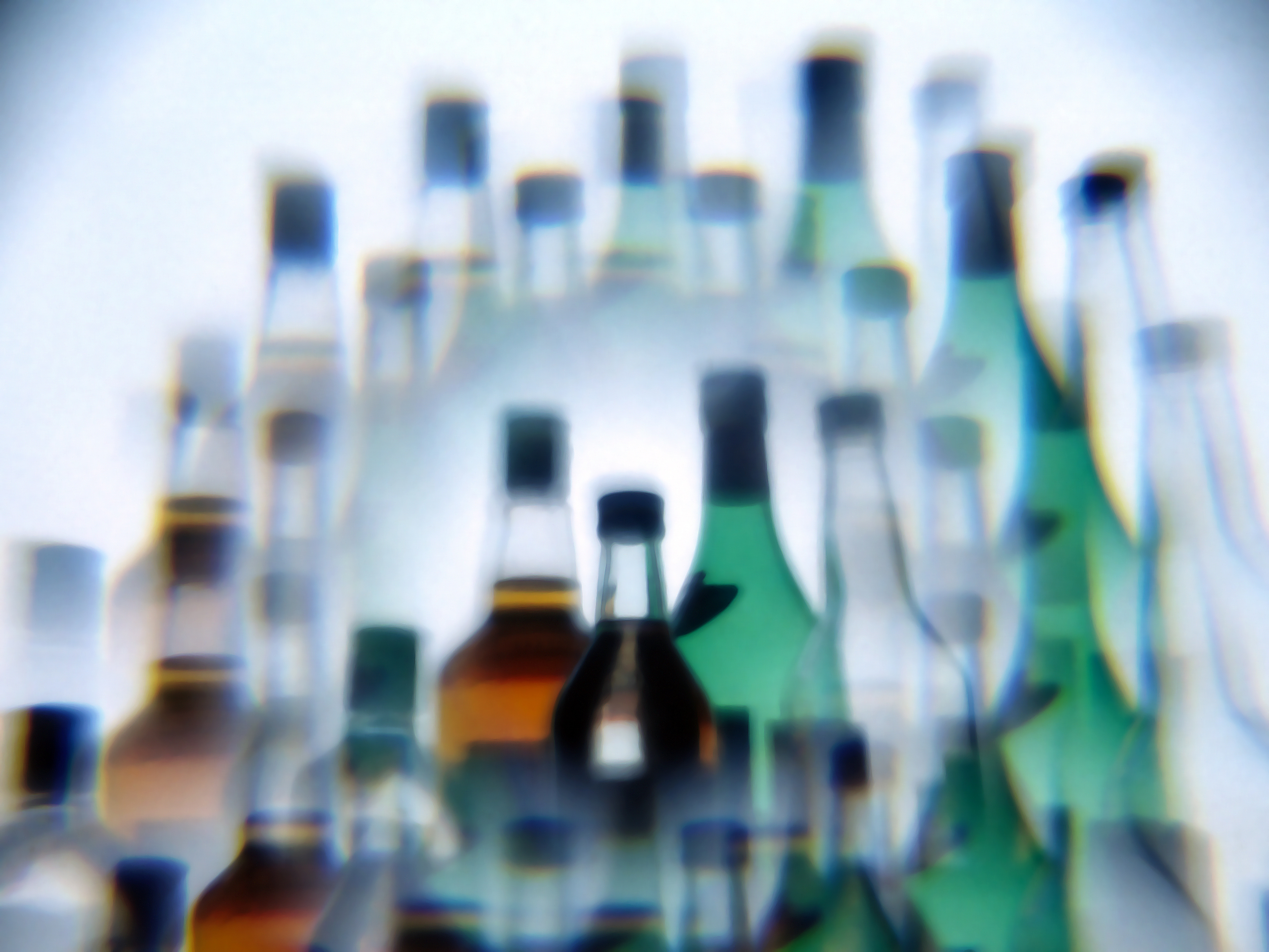
Still life photographed using a multi-image filter

A multi-image filter, sometimes called multiple image or kaleidoscopic, uses a faceted lens which generally repeats the central subject one or more times in the periphery; the images may be repeated with a radial or parallel layout.

== Physical design ==
=== Materials and construction ===
Photo filters are commonly made from glass, resin plastics similar to those used for eyeglasses (such as CR-39), polyester and polycarbonate; sometimes acetate is used. Historically, filters were often made from gelatin, and color gels. While some filters are still described as gelatin or gel filters, they are no longer actually made from gelatin but from one of the plastics mentioned above.

Sometimes the filter is dyed in the mass, in other cases the filter is a thin sheet of material sandwiched between two pieces of clear glass or plastic.

Certain kinds of filters use other materials inside a glass sandwich; for example, polarizers often use various special films, netting filters have nylon netting, and so forth.

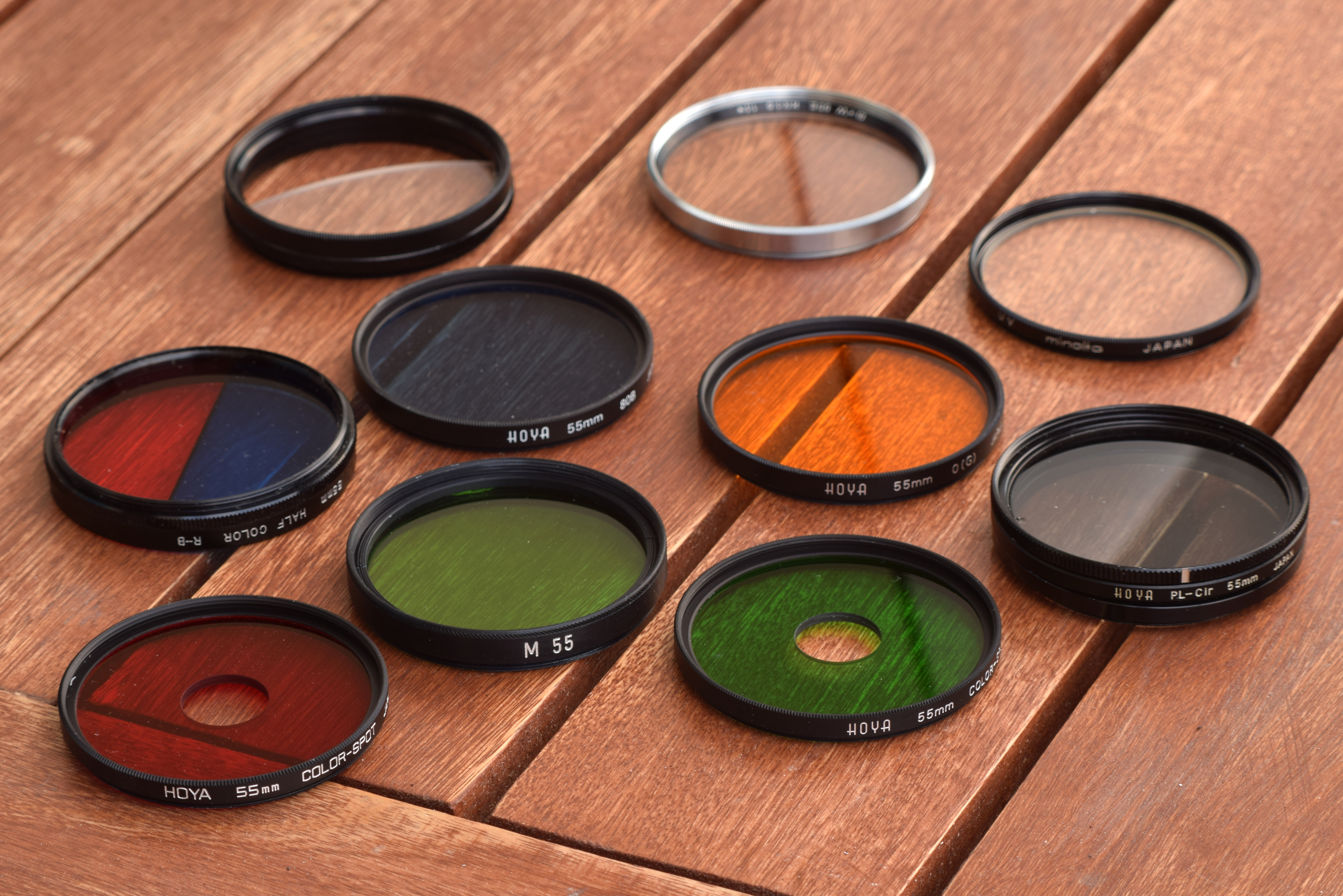
Hoya and Minolta round threaded filters, colored for contrast enhancement and special effects

The rings on screw-on filters are often made of aluminum, though in more expensive filters brass is used. Aluminum filter rings are much lighter in weight, but can "bind" to the aluminum lens threads they are screwed in to, requiring the use of a filter wrench to get the filter off of the lens. Aluminum also dents or deforms more easily.

High quality filters are multi-coated, with multiple-layer optical coatings to reduce reflections. Uncoated filters can reflect up to 12% of the light, single-coated filter can reduce this considerably, and multi-coated filters can allow up to 99.8% of the light to pass through (0.2% unwanted reflection); the loss of light is not important, but part of the light is reflected inside the camera, producing flare and reducing the contrast of the image.

=== Filter sizes and mountings ===
Manufacturers of lenses and filters have standardized on several different sets of sizes over the years.

==== Threaded round filters ====
Common objective filter threads
| Dia. (mm) | Thread pitch (mm) | |
| Dia. (mm) | Common | Alternate |
|---|---|---|
| 24 | 0.75 | —N/a |
| 25 | 0.75 | —N/a |
| 27 | 0.75 | —N/a |
| 30 | 0.75 | —N/a |
| 30.5 | 0.75 | —N/a |
| 34 | 0.75 | —N/a |
| 35.5 | 0.75 | —N/a |
| 36.5 | 0.75 | —N/a |
| 37 | 0.75 | —N/a |
| 37.5 | 0.75 | —N/a |
| 39 | 0.75 | —N/a |
| 40 | 0.75 | —N/a |
| 43 | 0.75 | —N/a |
| 46 | 0.75 | —N/a |
| 48 | 0.75 | —N/a |
| 49 | 0.75 | —N/a |
| 52 | 0.75 | —N/a |
| 53 | 0.75 | —N/a |
| 55 | 0.75 | —N/a |
| 58 | 0.75 | —N/a |
| 62 | 0.75 | —N/a |
| 67 | 0.75 | —N/a |
| 72 | 0.75 | —N/a |
| 77 | 0.75 | —N/a |
| 82 | 0.75 | —N/a |
| 86 | 0.75 | 1.0 |
| 94 | 0.75 | 1.0 |
| 95 | 0.75 | 1.0 |
| 105 | 0.75 | 1.0 |
| 107 | 0.75 | 1.0 |
| 110 | 0.75 | —N/a |
| 112 | 0.75 | —N/a |
| 112.5 | 0.75 | —N/a |
| 125 | 0.75 | 1.0 |
| 127 | 0.75 | —N/a |
| 138 | 0.75 | —N/a |
| 145 | 0.75 | —N/a |

The most common standard filter sizes for circular filters include 30.5 mm, 35.5 mm, 37 mm, 39 mm, 40.5 mm, 43 mm, 46 mm, 49 mm, 52 mm, 55 mm, 58 mm, 62 mm, 67 mm, 72 mm, 77 mm, 82 mm, 86 mm, 95 mm, 105 mm, 112 mm 122 mm, and 127 mm. The filter diameter has a steady increase from 43 to 58 mm every 3 mm and from 62 to 82 mm every 5 mm. Other filter sizes within this range may be hard to find since the filter size may be non-standard or may be rarely used on camera lenses. The specified diameter of the filter in millimeters indicates the diameter of the male threads on the filter housing. The thread pitch is 0.5 mm, 0.75 mm or 1.0 mm, depending on the ring size. A few sizes (e.g. 30.5 mm) come in more than one pitch. Most filters have a 0.75 mm pitch thread, some manufacturers use a 1.0 mm pitch thread; filters with thread pitches are incompatible with lenses with a different thread pitch.

The filter diameter for a particular lens is commonly identified on the lens face by the ⌀ symbol. For example, a lens marking may indicate: “⌀55 mm” or “55⌀” meaning it would accept a 55 mm filter or lens hood.

==== Square filters ====
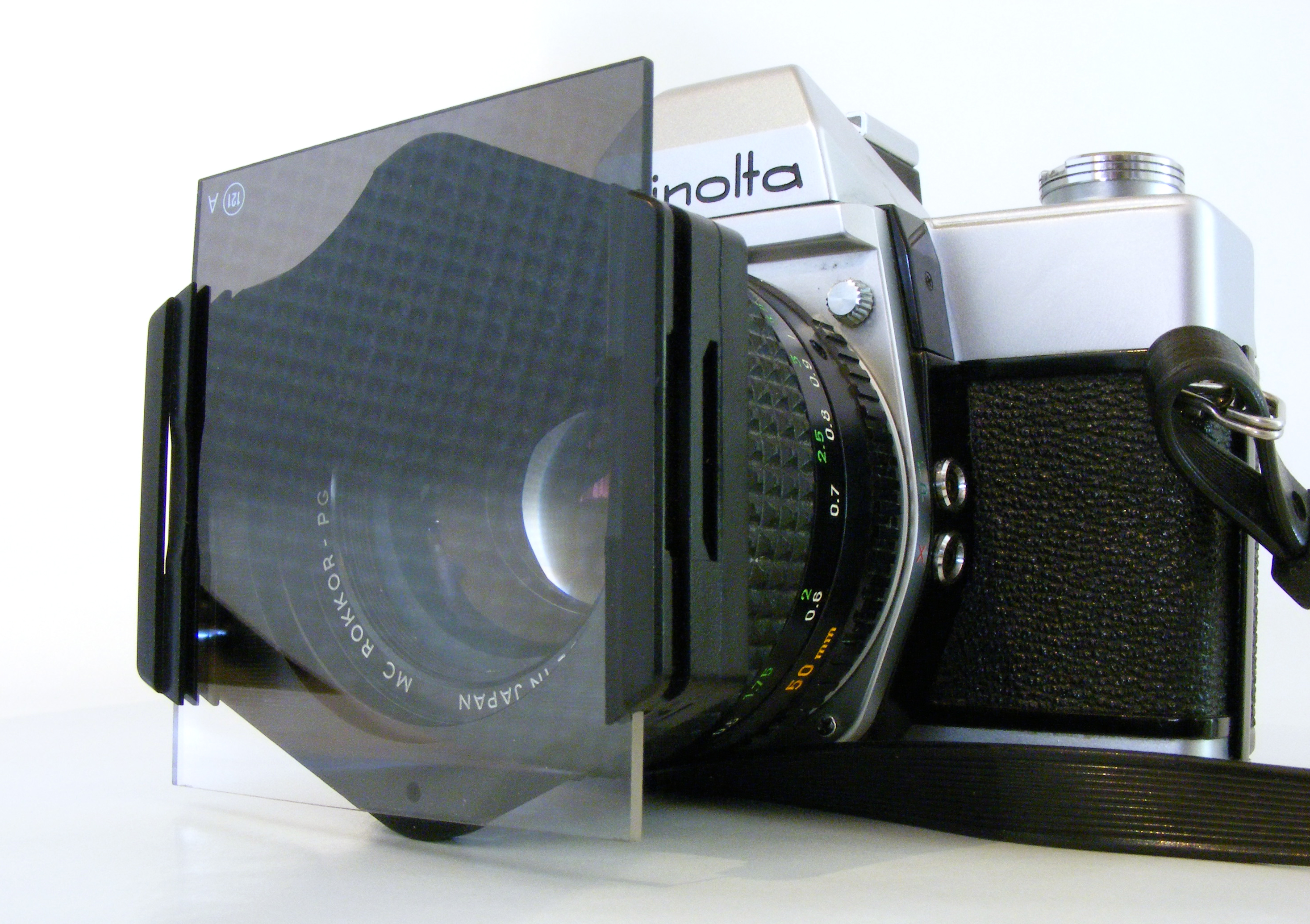
Minolta SR-T 101 with Cokin "A" graduated neutral density filter

For square filters, 2" × 2", 3" × 3" and 4" × 4" were historically very common and are still made by some manufacturers. 100 mm × 100 mm is very close to 4" × 4", allowing use of many of the same holders, and is one of the more popular sizes currently (2006) in use; it is virtually a standard in the motion picture industry. 75 mm x 75 mm is very close to 3" × 3" and while less common today, was much in vogue in the 1990s.

The French manufacturer Cokin makes a wide range of filters and holders in three sizes which is collectively known as the Cokin System. "A" (amateur) size is 67 mm wide, "P" (professional) size is 84 mm wide, and "X Pro" is 130 mm wide. Many other manufacturers make filters to fit Cokin holders. Cokin also makes a filter holder for 100 mm filters, which they call the "Z" size. Most of Cokin's filters are made of optical resins such as CR-39. A few round filter elements may be attached to the square/rectangular filter holders, usually polarizers and gradient filters which both need to be rotated and are more expensive to manufacture.

Cokin formerly (1980s through mid-1990s) had competition from Hoya's 'Hoyarex' system (75 mm x 75 mm filters mostly made from resin) and also a range made by Ambico, but both have withdrawn from the market. A small (84 mm) "system" range is still made (as of 2012) by Formatt Hitech. In general, square (and sometimes rectangular) filters from one system could be used in another system's holders if the size was correct, but each made a different system of filter holder which could not be used together. Lee, Tiffen, Formatt Hitech and Singh Ray also make square / rectangular filters in the 100 × 100 mm and Cokin "P" sizes.

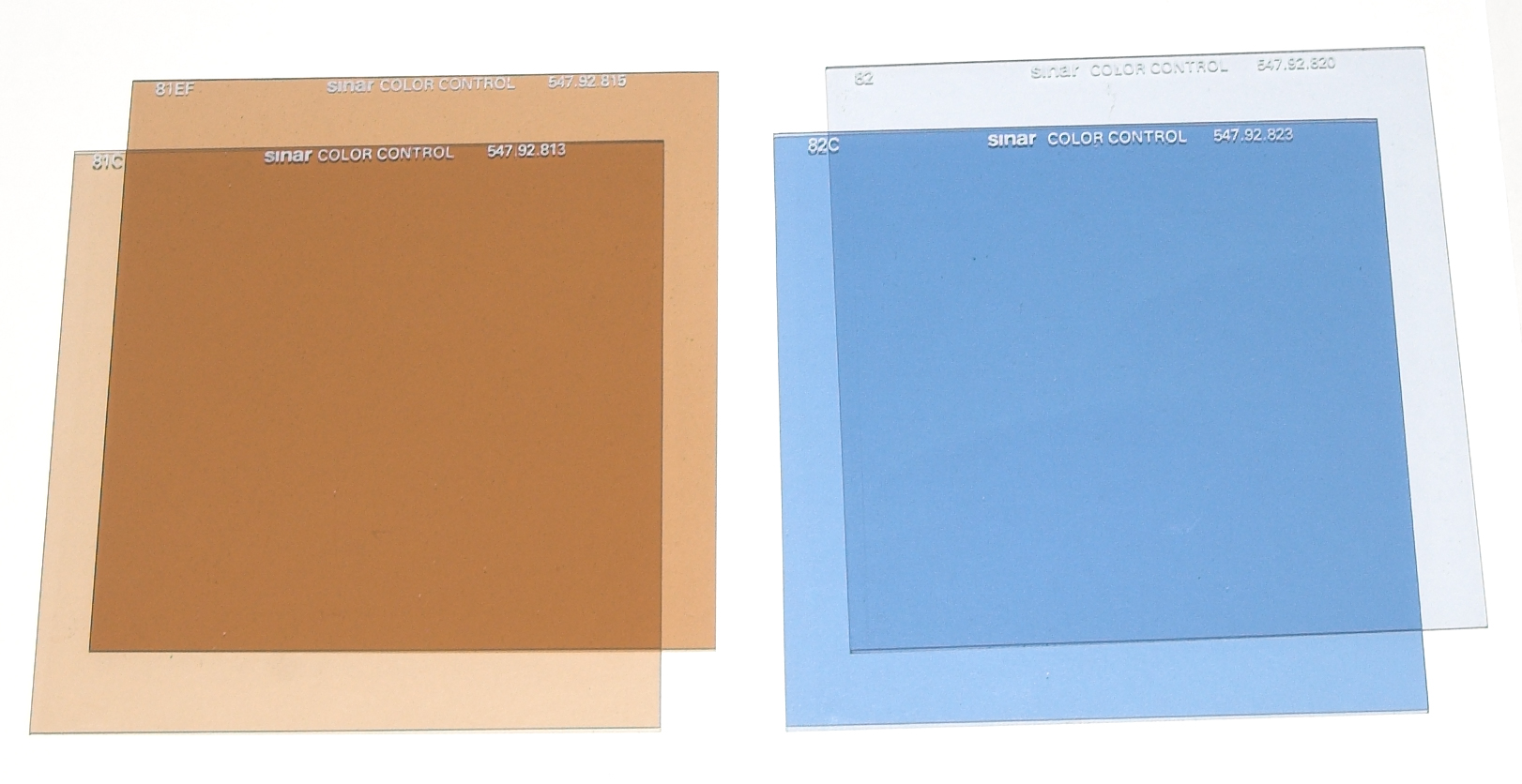
Sinar warming (left) and cooling (right) light balancing gel filters for color conversion from the Wratten 81 and 82 series, respectively

Gel filters are very common in square form, rarely being used in circular form. These are thin flexible sheets of gelatin or plastic which must be held in rigid frames to prevent them from sagging. Gels are made not only for use as photo filters, but also in a wide range of colors for use in lighting applications, particularly for theatrical lighting. Gel holders are available from all of the square “system” makers, but are additionally provided by many camera manufacturers, by manufacturers of gel filters, and by makers of expensive professional camera accessories (particularly those manufacturers which target the movie and television camera markets.

Square filter systems often have lens shades available to attach to the filter holders.

==== Rectangular filters ====
Graduated filters of a given width (67 mm, 84 mm, 100 mm, etc.) are often made oblong, rather than square, in order to allow the position of the gradation to be moved up or down in the picture. This allows, for example, the red part of a sunset filter to be placed at the horizon. These are used with the "system" holders described above.

==== Bayonet round filters ====
Certain manufacturers, most notably Rollei and Hasselblad, have created their own systems of bayonet mount for filters. Each design comes in several sizes, such as Bay I through Bay VIII for Rollei, and Bay 50 through Bay 104 for Hasselblad.

==== Series filters ====
Starting in the 1930s, filters were also made in a sizing system known as a Series mount. The Series filters are round pieces of glass (or occasionally other materials) with no threads. Very early Series filters had no rims around the glass, but the more common later production Series filters had the glass mounted in metal rims. The Series size designations are generally written as Roman numerals, I to IX, though there are a few sizes not written that way, such as Series 4.5 and Series 5.5.

Most Series filter sizes are now obsolete, production having ceased by the late 1970s. However, Series 9 (IX) became a standard of the motion picture industry and Series 9 filters are still produced and sold today, particularly for professional motion picture cinematography.

To mount Series filters on a camera lens, first an appropriate adapter is mounted to the lens, either by threading onto the lens, pushing into the lens, or clamping on to the lens barrel. Then the filter is placed in the adapter, and finally, a retaining ring is threaded into the adapter to secure the filter. In some cases, additional accessories, such as a lens hood or a second filter, can be accommodated in the adapter, or the hood itself may act as the retaining ring. Lenses designed for Series filters have a suitable adapter built-in to the front, and generally require only a retaining ring.

Series filter dimensions
| Series no. | Filter diam. | Retaining ring | Lens diam. (mm) |
|---|---|---|---|
| I | n/a | n/a | n/a |
| II | n/a | n/a | n/a |
| III | n/a | n/a | n/a |
| IV | 13/16 in (20.6 mm) | 15/16 in (23.8 mm) | 16–18 |
| 4.5 | 1 in (25.4 mm) | 1 1/8 in (28.6 mm) | 19–25 |
| V | 1 3/16 in (30.2 mm) | 1 1/4 in (31.8 mm) | 17–36 |
| 5.5 | 1 19/32 in (40.5 mm) | 1 23/32 in (43.7 mm) | 31–40 |
| VI | 1 5/8 in (41.3 mm) | 1 3/4 in (44.5 mm) | 27–49 |
| 6.5 | 1 7/8 in (47.6 mm) | 2 in (50.8 mm) | 43–48 |
| VII | 2 in (50.8 mm) | 2 1/8 in (54.0 mm) (36 tpi) | 40–62 |
| 7.5 | 2 1/4 in (57.2 mm) | 2 3/8 in (60.3 mm) | 52–57 |

| Series no. | Filter diam. | Retaining ring | Lens diam. (mm) |
|---|---|---|---|
| VIII | 2 1/2 in (63.5 mm) | 2 5/8 in (66.7 mm) | 40–77 |
| 8.5 | 2 15/16 in (74.6 mm) | 3 1/16 in (77.8 mm) | 67–75 |
| IX | 3 1/4 in (82.6 mm) | 3 7/16 in (87.3 mm) | 56–84 |
| 93 | 3 21/32 in (92.9 mm) | 3 25/32 in (96.0 mm) | 86–93 |
| 103 | 4 1/16 in (103.2 mm) | 4 3/16 in (106.4 mm) | 86–103 |
| 107 | 4 7/32 in (107.2 mm) | 4 11/32 in (110.3 mm) | 86–107 |
| X | 4 1/2 in (114.3 mm) | 4 5/8 in (117.5 mm) | 86–114 |
| 119 | 4 11/16 in (119.1 mm) | 4 13/16 in (122.2 mm) | 115–119 |
| 125 | 4 15/16 in (125.4 mm) | 5 1/16 in (128.6 mm) | 115–125 |
| 138 (XI) | 5 7/16 in (138.1 mm) | 5 9/16 in (141.3 mm) | 115–138 |

== See also ==
- Color gel
- List of photographic equipment makers
- Optical filter
