= Filter factor =

Multiplicative amount of light a photography filter blocks

In photography, filter factor refers to the multiplicative amount of light a filter blocks.

== Converting between filter factors and stops ==
The table below illustrates the relationship between filter factor, the amount of light that is allowed through the filter, and the number of stops this corresponds to.

Filter factor	Proportion of light transmitted (1/FF)	Number of stops
1	95–100%	0
1.3	75% (3/4)	1/3
1.4	70%	1/2
1.5	67% (2/3)	2/3
2	50% (1/2)	1
2.5	40% (2/5)	1 1/3
3	33% (1/3)	1 2/3
4	25% (1/4)	2
8	12.5% (1/8)	3
16	6.25% (1/16)	4

== Calculating exposure increase ==
The number of f-stops of light reduction, given a filter factor, may be calculated using the formula:

  
    
      
        
          log
          
            2
          
        
        ⁡
        (
        f
        i
        l
        t
        e
        r
        f
        a
        c
        t
        o
        r
        )
      
    
    {\displaystyle \log _{2}(filterfactor)}
  

Most calculators do not have a $\log_{2}$ function. An equivalent calculation is:

  
    
      
        
          log
          
            10
          
        
        ⁡
        (
        f
        i
        l
        t
        e
        r
        f
        a
        c
        t
        o
        r
        )
        
          /
        
        
          log
          
            10
          
        
        ⁡
        (
        2
        )
      
    
    {\displaystyle \log _{10}(filterfactor)/\log _{10}(2)}
  

or

  
    
      
        ln
        ⁡
        (
        f
        i
        l
        t
        e
        r
        f
        a
        c
        t
        o
        r
        )
        
          /
        
        ln
        ⁡
        (
        2
        )
      
    
    {\displaystyle \ln(filterfactor)/\ln(2)}
  

An example: A green filter with a filter factor of 4

  
    
      
        
          log
          
            10
          
        
        ⁡
        (
        4
        )
        =
        .602
      
    
    {\displaystyle \log _{10}(4)=.602}
  

  
    
      
        
          log
          
            10
          
        
        ⁡
        (
        2
        )
        =
        .301
      
    
    {\displaystyle \log _{10}(2)=.301}
  

  
    
      
        .602
        
          /
        
        .301
        =
        2
      
    
    {\displaystyle .602/.301=2}
  

The green filter factor of 4 yields a 2 f-stop light reduction.

The filter factor, given the exposure change in f-stops, may be calculated using the formula:

  
    
      
        
          2
          
            f
            s
            t
            o
            p
          
        
        =
        f
        i
        l
        t
        e
        r
        f
        a
        c
        t
        o
        r
      
    
    {\displaystyle 2^{fstop}=filterfactor}
  

An example: A deep red filter with an f-stop change of 3 stops

  
    
      
        
          2
          
            3
          
        
        =
        8
      
    
    {\displaystyle 2^{3}=8}
  

A change of 3 f-stops is equivalent to a filter factor of 8.

As a consequence of this relationship, filter factors should be multiplied together when such filters are stacked, as opposed to stop adjustments, which should be added together.

== Filter factors for common filters ==
The table below gives approximate filter factors for a variety of common photographic filters. Filter factors are highly dependent on the spectral response curve of the film being used. Thus, filter factors provided by the film manufacturer should be preferred over the ones documented below. Furthermore, these factors are for daylight color temperature (5600K); when shooting under a different color temperature of ambient light, these values will most likely be incorrect.

Filter purpose	Wratten number	Other designation	Filter factor
Ultraviolet		UV(0)	1
Skylight	1A or 1B	KR1.5	1
Contrast filters
Yellow	8	Y, K2, Y48, 022	2
Yellow-green	11	X0	2.5
Orange	21		3
Red	25	A, 090, R2	8
Deep Red	29	F, 091	20
Green	58	X1	4
Infra-Red	89B	R72	16
Infra-Red	70	092	20-40
Colour conversion (blue)
3200 K to 5500 K	80A	KB15	4
3400 K to 5500 K	80B	KB12	3
3800 K to 5500 K	80C	KB6	2
Warming filters
3400 K to 3200 K	81A	A2	1.4
3500 K to 3200 K	81B		1.4
3600 K to 3200 K	81C	KR3	1.4
3700 K to 3200 K	81D		1.5
3850 K to 3200 K	81EF	KR6	1.5
Cooling filters
3000 K to 3200 K	82A	B2, KB1.5	1.3
2900 K to 3200 K	82B		1.5
2800 K to 3200 K	82C	KB3	1.5
Colour conversion (orange)
5500 K to 3400 K	85 / 85A	KR12	1.6
5500 K to 3200 K	85B	KR15	1.6
5500 K to 3800 K	85C		1.3
Neutral density
0.3	96	NDx2	2
0.6	96	NDx4	4
0.9	96	NDx8	8
3.0	96	NDx1000	1000
Polarizers
Linear polarizer		PL or LP	3 to 4
Circular polarizer		PL-Cir, C-PL, CP	3 to 4

== See also ==
- Filter (photography)
- Filter (optics)
- Wratten number
- Exposure (photography)
- F-number
