= Tungsten film =

Photographic film

Tungsten film is photographic film designed to accurately represent colors as perceived by humans under tungsten light; the more usual color films are "daylight films", balanced to produce accurate colours under direct light from the sun or electronic flash. Tungsten film was developed for photographers who use tungsten lights, also known as photofloods, which have a much lower color temperature than daylight, at 3200 kelvins or 3400 kelvins. It also renders colors more accurately than daylight film under ordinary household incandescent lighting.

On daylight-balanced film tungsten lighting produces a spectrally accurate rendition of a scene; but human vision adjusts to the color of the lighting and perceives colors as if under daylight, seeing a spectrally accurate image as having a yellow-orange cast. Tungsten film is balanced in such a way that this lighting is recorded with a subjectively neutral color balance. When shot outdoors, tungsten film produces a strong blue cast, an effect which is often used purposely to create different color contrasts. In the motion picture industry the use of underexposed tungsten-balanced film in an outdoor setting is a common way of producing a "day for night" effect, whereby film shot during the daytime looks as if it had been shot at night.

Tungsten slide films are designed to provide accurate exposure as well as color rendition even when exposed according to exposure meter readings indicating a long exposure; tungsten film can be used to avoid reciprocity failure which often occurs when using long exposures. Common film speeds for tungsten-balanced slide film are ISO 64, 160, and 320.

== Examples ==
- Cinestill 800t
- Kodak 500t
- Ektachrome 64T
