= Photographic lighting =

How a light source illuminates the scene or subject of a photograph

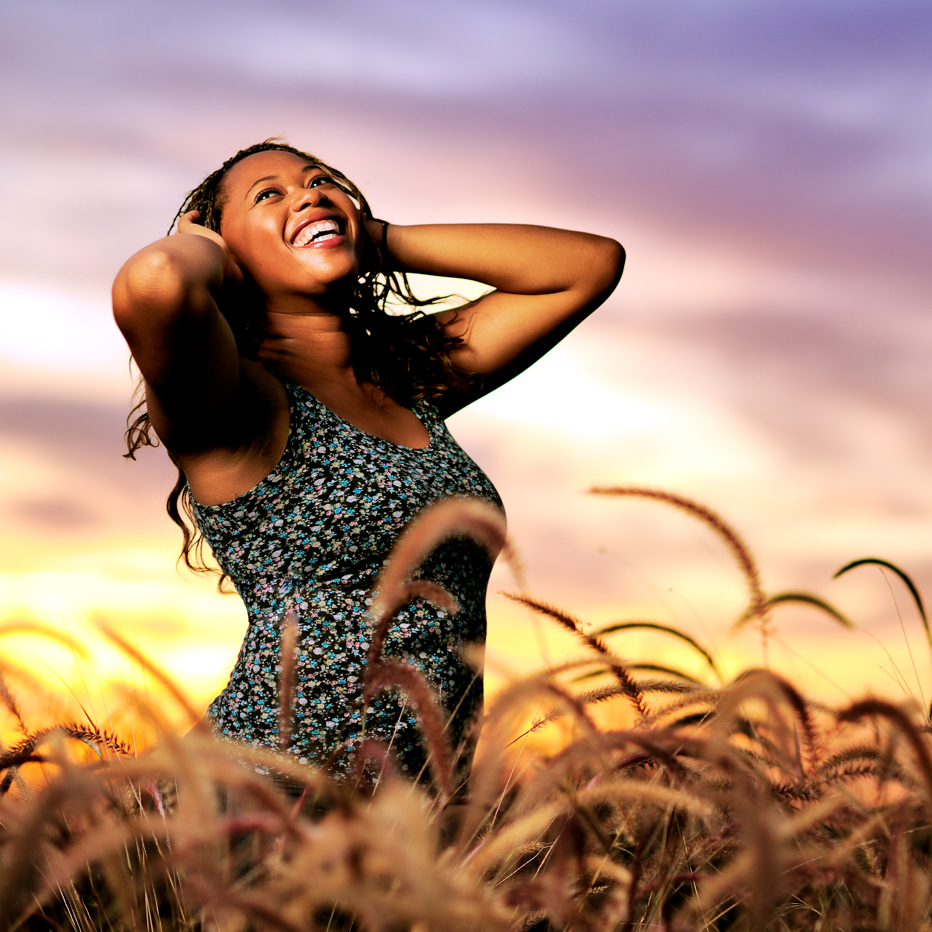
The model was lit on the left with a strobe. The light was warmed with an orange gel to match the sunset.

Photographic lighting refers to how a light source, artificial or natural, illuminates the scene or subject that is photographed; put simply, it is lighting in regards to photography. Photographers can manipulate the positioning and the quality of a light source to create visual effects, potentially changing aspects of the photograph such as clarity, tone and saturation to create an accurate rendition of the scene.

Lighting determines exposure and can be used to create effects such as low-key and high-key lighting, both of which involve the contrast between darker and lighter elements in a scene. Lighting is especially important for monochrome photography, where there is limited to no color information, and exclusively includes the interplay of highlights and shadows.

== Main sources ==
The main sources of light for photography are:

- Daylight, which is determined via the weather as well as the time. Different techniques are necessary to take full advantage of bright sunshine and an overcast evening.
- Continuous artificial light, also known as normal lighting, produced by special photoflood lights. The properties of different light sources vary; sources such as household incandescent lighting, fluorescent lighting, and sodium discharge street lighting produce a wide range of results and require different correction if a subjectively neutral rendition of colors is required.
- A bright and very brief photographic flash from a single position (close to the camera generally), typically used in a studio environment.
- Candid sources including lightning, electric sparks, fireworks, and moonlight.

== Basic lighting patterns ==
- Loop lighting produces a small shadow of the subject's nose on the shadow side of the face.
- Butterfly lighting, named for the butterfly-shaped shadow under the nose, the butterfly lighting pattern is created when the light is above and in line with the camera.
- Split lighting, where the main light is placed off to the side of the subject at about 90 degrees and positioned at face height or slightly above. The subject looks straight on at the camera.
- Rembrandt lighting, which entails a contrast of dramatic lighting coming from the top and the side, thus giving specific light spot on the other cheek.

== Perceptual cause and effect ==
Lighting creates the 2D pattern of contrast that the brain interprets in order to recognize 3D objects in photographs. When viewing something in-person, the brain relies on stereoscopic vision, parallax, shifting focal in addition to the clues created by the highlight and shadow patterns the light on the object creates. When viewing a photo, however, the brain tries to match the patterns of contrast and color it sees to other sensory memories.

The baseline for what seems "normal" in lighting is often the direction and character of natural and artificial light as well as the context provided by other clues. In the picture above, the photographer added a warming gel on the flash of the woman standing in a field in late afternoon light. The viewer knows the time of day from the angle of the shadows; therefore, neutral color balance would have seemed odd in that context. However, if masked out and put on a plain white or neutral gray background, the image of the woman would seem abnormally yellow.

While the goal of photography is not necessarily to create an impression of normality, knowing what the audience normally expects to see is required to pull off a lighting strategy that fools the brain. Light direction relative to the camera can make a round ball appear to be a flat disk or a sphere. The position of highlights and direction and length of shadows will provide other clues to shape and can even indicate the time of day. The tone of the shadows on an object also can provide contextual clues about the time of day, the environment in which the photo was taken, and even the mood of the person.

A skilled photographer can manipulate how a viewer is likely to react to the content of a photo by manipulating the lighting. When shooting outdoors, changing locations may be required, as well as waiting for the ideal time of day (or even the ideal time of year in some cases) for the lighting to create the desired impression in the photo. Photographers may also manipulate natural lighting by using reflectors or flash. In a studio setting, however, there is no limit to the options a photographer has for lighting. Objects can be made to either look normal as "seen by the eye" or surreal as the goals for the photograph require. Usually, the viewer's reaction will depend on whether or not the lighting seems normal/natural compared to other clues.

Mixing natural and artificial light can be a difficult process. A mistake less-skilled photographers often make when mixing flash and natural lighting is not matching the light from the flash with the highlight and shadow clues seen in a background lit with ambient light. For example, if the background is illuminated by the setting sun, but the face in the foreground appears to have been photographed at noon, it will not seem normal, as the lighting clues do not match.

== The natural light baseline ==
The sun hitting the front of objects facing the camera acts as a "key light," creating highlights and casting shadows. Detail in shadows can be seen due to the reflection of sunlight off water vapor and dust in the atmosphere creating omni-directional "fill". In open shade, 3D objects will also usually cast shadows because the downward vector of skylight is usually stronger than the sideways vectors illuminating the sides. When a photographer puts the sun behind an object, however, its role in the lighting strategy changes from modeling the front of the object to defining its outline (silhouette) and creating the impression of physical separation and 3D space that a frontally illuminated scene normally lacks. To differentiate that role from that of "key" modeling in which a lighting source is place behind the subject, it is typically called a "rim" or "accent" light. In portrait lighting, it also called a "hair" light because it is used to create the appearance of physical separation between the subject's head and background. In natural lighting, the tone of the background is influenced by its reflective qualities and whether it is illuminated by the sun directly or skylight indirectly. Therefore, either the sun or sky, or a combination of both, can be considered "background" lighting.

Midday sunlight can be challenging to use, as light may be too bright and shadows too dark. The degree of overexposure depends on the film and the camera used, as well as their different dynamic features. These characteristics are particularly important for portrait photography, in which an extra flash is often used to balance the light on the face or other parts of the body and to soften contrasting shadows in order to properly balance photographic exposure.

== Creating natural-looking artificial lighting ==
Artificial lighting strategies that seem most "natural" duplicate the same contrast pattern clues seen on 3D objects in various lighting conditions. A typical studio lighting configuration will consist of a fill source to control shadow tone, a single frontal key light to create the highlight modeling clues on the front of objects facing the camera over the shadows the fill illuminates, one or more rim/accent lights to create separation between foreground and background, and one or more background lights to control the tone of the background and separation between it and the foreground.

There are two significant differences between natural lighting and artificial sources: the character of the fill and the fall-off in intensity. In nature, light from the sky is omni-directional and usually brighter from above. That "wrap around" characteristic is difficult to duplicate with a directional artificial source. In a fixed studio location, it is possible to bounce fill backwards off a white wall to flood the space with indirect reflected light similar to how the sun reflects off the atmosphere. Another way is to supplement a fill source from the direction of the camera with reflectors placed near the sides of the foreground subject.

The Inverse-Square Law describes the predictable way a point light source radiates and changes in intensity with distance. As the distance from a source doubles, the area of the footprint of light increases by a factor of four, the square ^2 of the distance. Because the same number of photons are spread over four times the area when distance is doubled, the intensity at any point will be 1/ distance ^2 or 1/4 the strength. Photographic light sources are not point light sources, so the law does not strictly apply. However, it does explain why the distance of artificial sources affects the character of lighting and lighting strategies in ways not seen in nature.

If the distance of a light source is changed in the following distance increments 1, 1.4, 2, 2.8, 4, 5.6, 8, 11, 16, 22, 32, 45, 64 the intensity will decrease by one f/stop. Notice how each step increases by the square root of 2. In practical terms, it means that if one face in a group portrait is 4 metres from the "key" light and another is 5.6 m away, the face further from the light will be one f/stop darker. In an outdoor portrait of a group of 200 people taken on an overcast day, the lighting of all the faces will be equal. The same group photographed indoors would be far more difficult to light evenly. The simplest strategy requiring the least flash equipment would be to get above the group with the camera, have them look up, and bounce the lighting off the ceiling. This way every face is as equidistant as possible to the apparent source of the light, much as with an overcast day.

Even something as basic as a head and shoulders portrait must take inverse-square fall-off into account by posing the front of the subject's face as close or closer to the "key" light than the shoulder or any other body part if the goal is to make the front of the face the most strongly contrasting focal point on a darker background. The position of the fill source relative to the face will also affect whether the nose shadow is the lightest (when fill is centered near camera) or darkest (when fill is placed to the side) one on the face. The distance of the key light and fill sources to the face will affect the rate at which the shadows transition from light to dark on the face.

== Creating surreal lighting ==
Natural and surreal lighting are different sides of the same coin. Understanding what makes lighting seem natural makes it easier to understand how to create other desired reactions. Natural light usually comes from above, so strategies which place the key light below the face will appear to be unusual or unnatural. The brain adapts color perception in a way that makes color balance seem neutral on white clothing and faces. The eyes also adapt to brightness as they scan and usually perceive a full range of detail in most environments. Lighting a scene with a tonal range or color cast which is out of context with what would typically be expected will cause the viewer to notice the environment and make other than normal assumptions about it. It is also possible to create the impression of environmental context where none is seen in the photograph, such as the look of a person standing under a streetlight at night by using a grid flash attached to the ceiling of the studio with no fill source.

== Three light setup ==
The three light setup is a common method used in photography. This method uses three separate lighting positions to give the photographer a great deal of control in illuminating the subject. It is formed by a main light known as the "key", the fill light, and the backlight.

== Reflected light ==
This is when a flash is directed upwards or sideways. The light is reflected from a wall, the ceiling, or a reflector, and gives more nuances to the subject. The main advantage is that the subject does not face the light source.
