= Cokin =

French manufacturer of optical filters for photography

logo of cokin

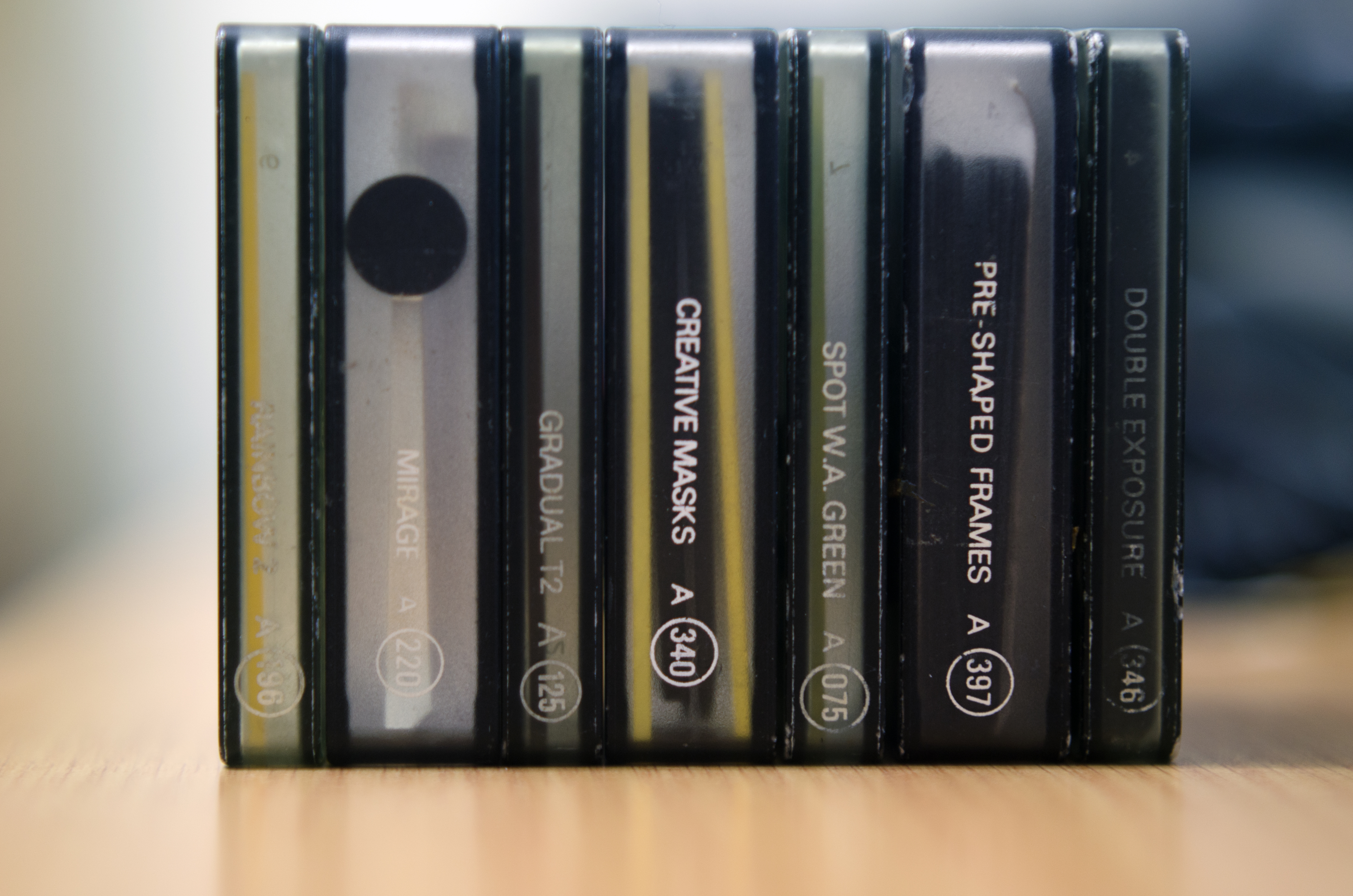
Stacked cases of Cokin filters.

Cokin is a French manufacturer of optical filters for photography. The system allows filters such as rectangular graduated neutral density filters which are versatile in use.

== History ==
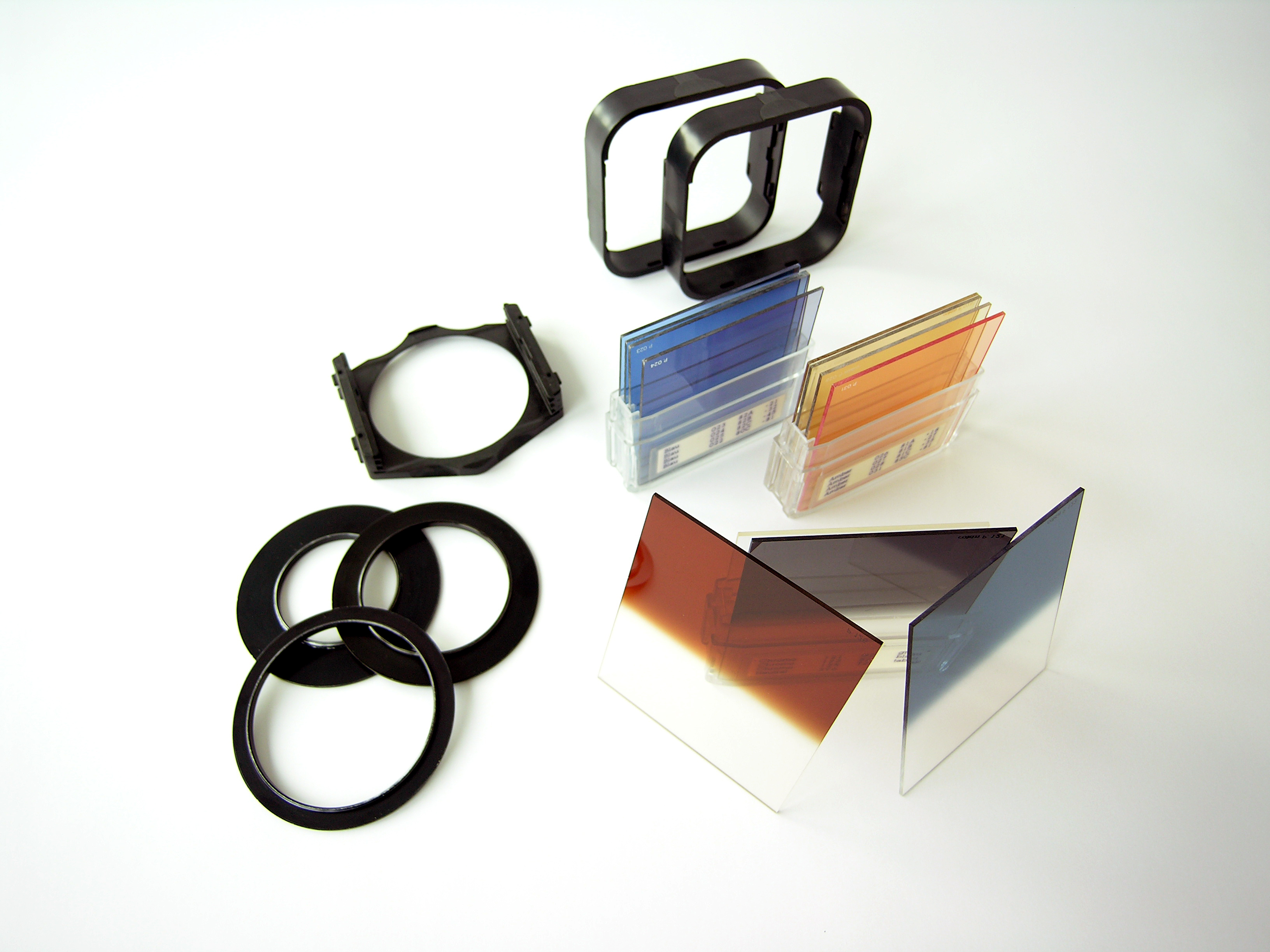
Cokin Creative Suite

Cokin are particularly noted for their "Creative Filter System". It was invented by photographer Jean Coquin and introduced in 1978. Based primarily around square filters, these require a holder which is attached to the lens via a simple adapter ring of the appropriate size. Unlike screw-thread circular filters, which are each tied to lenses of a specific diameter, those in the system can be used with any lens, provided they are large enough to cover it sufficiently. (Only the adapter ring may need changing).

== Production ==
The system includes a wide range of filters including color correction, plain and coloured graduated filters, diffraction, diffusion and polarizers. The material is a polymer, CR-39 sometimes advertised as "organic glass".

Cokin produce various differently-sized versions of the Creative Filter System. The smallest is "A" ("Amateur", 67mm wide). The larger "P" ("Professional", 84mm wide) system covers cases where "A" filters are too small to cover the lens (or would cause problems at wider angles). The still-larger "X-Pro" filters are 130mm wide. The "A" and "P" sizes in particular are de facto standards, with many other manufacturers producing compatible filters and holders. Cokin also produce a system for 100mm-wide filters which they refer to as "Z-Pro". "X-Pro" and "Z-Pro" are designed for larger cameras.
