= Frederick Wratten =

English inventor of prepared photographic plates

Frederick Charles Luther Wratten (1840, England – 8 April 1926, London) was an English inventor.

Wratten started his career as a school teacher and organist, and moved to London in 1861 to become a clerk at Joseph Solomon's Photographic & Optical Warehouse. His work at the warehouse stimulated his interest in photography, and while there he learned how to use gelatin in a sensitized emulsion and began experimenting on his own.

In 1876, Wratten developed the use of alcohol in drying gelatin emulsion and removing unwanted silver nitrate. This process was described in the British Journal of Photography of 1877 and 1878. During the course of his experiments, Wratten formed a partnership with Henry Wainwright (1877~) for the manufacturing and sale of photographic supplies. Wratten & Wainwright were the first firm in England to offer prepared photographic plates.

Wratten is also credited with introducing the noodling process for pre-washed gelatin emulsion in 1878, which substantially increases the surface area of the emulsion and thus the efficiency of the process. This allowed creating more sensitive photographic plates than previously possible. In 1906 Wratten incorporated his company with his son, S. H. Wratten, and C. E. Kenneth Mees as owners. Mees, a recent graduate of London University, was placed in charge of new product development, and soon introduced panchromatic plates sensitive to longer wavelengths. To allow photography using particular wavelengths of light, Mees developed dyed gelatin filters which were placed between the plate or lens and the subject matter. These colored filters, later known as Wratten filters, began with yellow filters dyed with tartrazine (CAS # 1934-21-0), but were soon available in many more colors. George Eastman purchased Wratten and Wainwright in 1912, to be merged with Kodak Ltd. Frederick and S. H. Wratten continued working at Kodak's branch in Harrow, while Mees moved to Rochester, New York to found Eastman Kodak's Research Laboratories.

== See also ==
- Wratten number
- Kenneth Mees
