= Mired =

Unit of reciprocal color temperature

Close up of the Planckian locus in the CIE 1960 color space

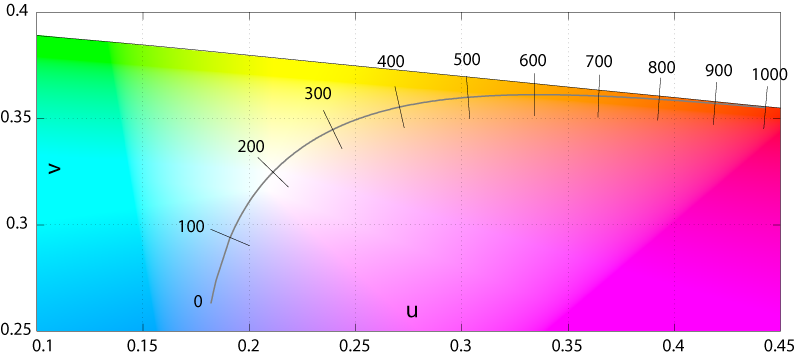
Isotherms in mireds

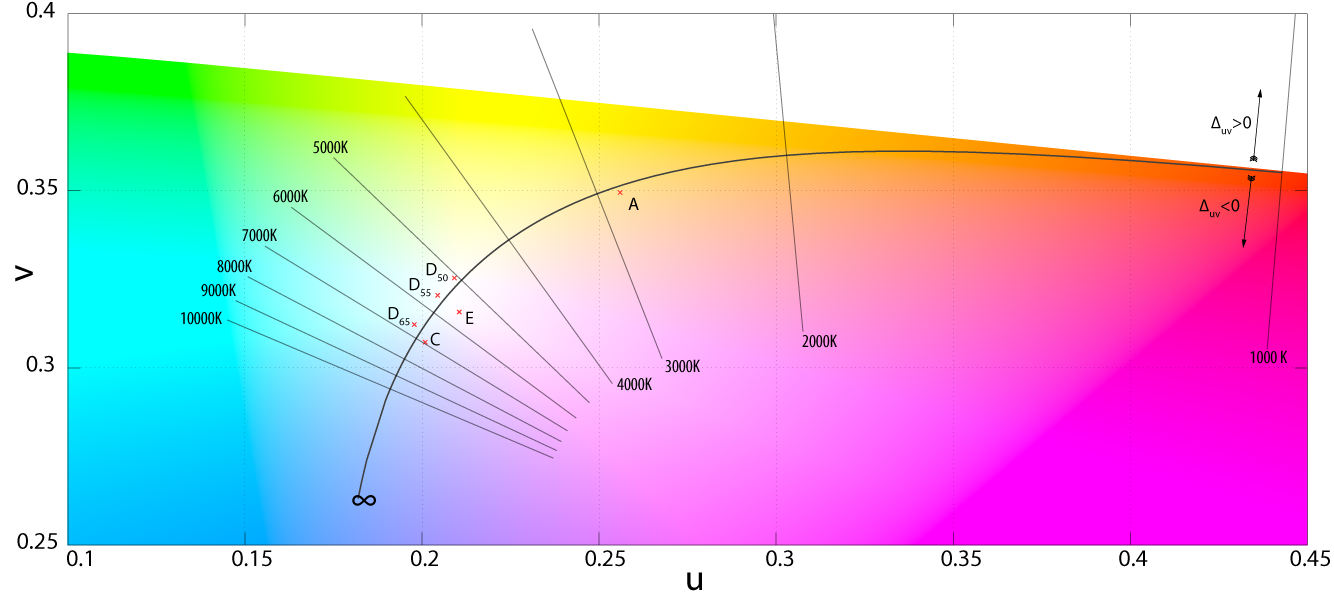
Isotherms in kelvins

Note the even spacing of the isotherms when using the reciprocal temperature scale. The even spacing of the isotherms on the locus implies that the mired scale is a better measure of perceptual color difference than the temperature scale. The range of isothermal color temperatures for both diagrams is from 1000 K (1000 MK^{−1}) to 10000 K (100 MK^{−1}).

Contracted from the term micro reciprocal degree, the mired (/ˈmaɪrɛd/) is a unit of measurement used to express color temperature. Values in mireds are calculated by the formula:

$$M = \frac{1\,000\,000 \,\text{K}}{T},$$

where T is the colour temperature in units of kelvins and M denotes the resulting mired dimensionless number. The constant 1000000 K is one million kelvins.

The SI term for this unit is the reciprocal megakelvin (MK^{−1}), shortened to mirek, but this term has not gained traction.

For convenience, decamireds are sometimes used, with a decamired equaling ten mireds.

The use of the term mired dates back to Irwin G. Priest's observation in 1932 that the just-noticeable difference between two illuminants is directly related to the difference of the reciprocals of their temperatures, rather than to the difference in their temperatures.

== Examples ==
A blue sky, which has a color temperature T of about 25000 K, has a mired value of M = 40 mireds, while a standard electronic photography flash, having a color temperature T of 5000 K, has a mired value of M = 200 mireds.

Common color temperature and mired equivalents
Light source	Temp. (K)	Mired
Skylight (clear, blue)	15000–27000	40–70
Shade, illuminated by skylight	10000–12000	80–100
Skylight (hazy)	7500–8400	120–130
Overcast	6700–7000	140–150
Electronic flash	6200–6800	150–160
Sunlight (hazy)	5800	170
Daylight (average)	5500–6000	170–180
Daylight (morning / afternoon)	5000–5500	180–200
LED (cool white)	3100–4500	220–320
Professional tungsten	3200	310
Incandescent bulb (100 W)	2900	340
Incandescent bulb (40 W)	2650	380

== Applications ==
=== Photographic filter and gel ===
Mired difference can be quickly approximated with a nomogram

In photography, mireds are used to indicate the color temperature shift provided by a filter or gel for a given film and light source. For instance, to use daylight film (5700 K) to take a photograph under a tungsten light source (3200 K) without introducing a color cast, one would need a corrective filter or gel providing a mired shift

$$\frac{10^6}{5700} - \frac{10^6}{3200} \approx -137~\text{MK}^{-1}.$$

This corresponds to a color temperature blue (CTB) filter. Color gels with negative mired values appear green or blue, while those with positive values appear amber or red.

=== CCT calculation ===
A number of mathematical methods, including Robertson's, calculate the correlated color temperature of a light source from its chromaticity values. These methods exploit the relatively even spacing of the mired unit internally.

=== Color description ===
Apple's HomeKit uses the mired unit for specifying color temperature.
