= Transmission curve =

Transmission of a signal or filter as a function of frequency or wavelength

The transmission curve or transmission characteristic is the mathematical function or graph that describes the transmission fraction of an optical or electronic filter as a function of frequency or wavelength. It is an instance of a transfer function but, unlike the case of, for example, an amplifier, output never exceeds input (maximum transmission is 100%). The term is often used in commerce, science, and technology to characterise filters.

The term has also long been used in fields such as geophysics and astronomy to characterise the properties of regions through which radiation passes, such as the ionosphere.

== See also ==
- Electronic filter — examples of transmission characteristics of electronic filters
