= Photoflood =

Powerful incandescent lamp used for photography

Photoflood lamps are a type of incandescent light bulb designed for use as a continuous light source for photographic lighting. The filaments of such lamps are operated at much higher temperatures than is the case for standard, general lighting service lamps. The result is a brilliance of light much higher than the lamp's wattage rating would suggest. The trade-off is that the lamp has a very short service life of seldom more than ten hours.

== Applications ==
=== Past ===
Photoflood lamps were used by photographers and film makers as a continuous lighting source. However for photographers, such use has been overtaken by the use of high power studio flash units many of which also provide a lower power light for modelling purposes. Film makers have turned to longer lasting tungsten halogen lamps which, in their turn, are being overtaken by light-emitting diode (LED) lamps.

=== Present ===
Photoflood lamps are still used in special cases by the motion picture industry. Where an illuminated lamp is required on set as part of the dressing, the light fall from a normal light bulb would not be visible on film as it would be swamped by the bright studio lighting. The ordinary lamp is replaced by a photoflood bulb whose intense light is easily visible on film (and if so required, is bright enough that it can form the sole illumination for the shot).

== Lamp characteristics ==
Photoflood bulbs are available in a number of sizes. The two most common sizes have these characteristics.

120 volt lamps
Type	Watts	Lumens	Lumens per watt	Colour temperature (K)	Avg. Life (hours)	ANSI code
100 watt lamp	100	1630	16.3		750	
No. 1 photoflood	250	6500	26	3200	20	ECA
No. 2 photoflood	500	17,800	35.6	3400	6	EBV

240 volt lamps
Type	Watts	Lumens	Lumens per watt	Colour temperature (K)	Avg. Life (hours)
100 watt lamp	100	1200	12	2900	1000
No. 1 photoflood	275	8500	30	3400	3
No. 2 photoflood	500	14,400	28.8	3400	6

Note that in each case an ordinary 100 watt lamp is provided for comparison purposes.
