= Dalsa Origin =

Digital motion picture camera

The Dalsa Origin was the first camera designed and built by Dalsa Corporation to be used specifically for digital cinematography.

== Overview ==
The Dalsa Origin is the first commercially available digital cinema camera to capture at 4K resolution, the emerging quality standard for feature film content.

The camera was originally shown at the NAB Show 2003 in Las Vegas, where Dalsa received four industry awards for innovation. The camera initially became available for testing in 2006, and was available for rental for $3000 per day, including storage, from the company's camera rental facility in Woodland Hills, which was established in mid-2005 by Bobby DaSilva as President of Dalsa Digital Cinema.

The camera is suited for visual effects photography employing digital compositing and travelling matte photography on larger budget productions. The system was developed by a collective group, including cinematographer, and founder of Cinema Products Ed DiGiulio. During the development of the DALSA Origin camera it was tested by members of the filmmaking world including Daryn Okada, ASC, Allen Daviau, ASC and various members of the commercial and VFX industries.

In 2007 the Origin camera was upgraded to the production version of the camera, and re-branded Origin II also known as the Evolution. The Origin II upgrade features improved image quality from DALSA's latest generation frame transfer CCD sensor, and a simplified touch screen interface.

== Technical details ==
The camera has a resolution of 4K (4096×2048) at a relatively high-bit depth. The camera outputs an uncompressed, RAW Bayer pattern 16-bit image, which was considerably higher than other cameras which are limited to 8, 10 or 12 bits. This results in a linear exposure latitude equivalent to more than 13 stops.

The final configuration of the camera can run 1–30 frames per second. The Origin II camera features an optical reflex viewing system with rotating mirror similar to 35 mm film cameras and uses standard PL mount 35 mm film gate lenses. The camera is approximately the same size and weight as an average 35 mm film cameras with a 400' magazine.

The camera outputs raw data to an off board storage unit at a rate of approximately 400 megabytes per second. The Origin II connects to the storage unit by a rugged, thin, and flexible mil-spec fiber optic cable. This fiber cable can be run for over a mile without any signal degradation or repeating. The storage unit that has been used most often was the Codex Digital recorder, which could hold about two hours of uncompressed 4K camera RAW footage. In January 2008 S.Two began shipping the DFR4K recorder, which can also capture images from the Origin II camera and similar 2K and 4K models. S.Two also manufactured a system of 4K workflow products that are compatible with the Origin II camera's 4K images.

== Filmography and commercial projects ==
The camera was successfully used in a number of projects including "Postcards from the Future", directed by Alan Chan and shot by Eric Adkins; a Snickers commercial, directed by Jesse Dylan and shot by Rolf Kestermann; a beer commercial by Curtis Clark, ASC; a Greenpeace commercial, shot by Florian Stadler; a Motorola commercial, shot by Byron Werner; a short entitled "The Trident", directed by Anurag Mehta and shot by David Stump, ASC; "She Called Up", a music video for the band Crowded House shot by Damian Acevedo; a promo for ABC 7 Eyewitness News, shot by Mark Zavad; "Reach for Me" a feature film directed by LeVar Burton and shot by Kris Kosskove; and most recently a British short, "Drop", directed by Gavin Toomey and shot by Tom Debenham, starring Russell Tovey.

Also, the James Bond film, Quantum of Solace, featured a complex visual effects shot captured with eight DALSA 4K Origin cameras, though was largely shot on conventional 35mm negative. The company revealed that the technically ambitious visual effects shot featured Daniel Craig and actress Olga Kurylenko, and involved simultaneously shooting with eight shutter-synchronized DALSA Origin 4K cameras.

Two remaining Dalsa Origin Cameras currently reside in Ryerson University's Digital Cinema Research Lab (a collaborator with Dalsa's research in Toronto, Canada) where they were used in production of research material demonstrating 4K resolution, and a short 3D test production called "Banana Jam" was created by the Lab's Director Richard Grunberg.

== Workflow overview ==
While any professional off-line NLE can be used with the Origin II proxy images, in the relatively short life of the camera system Final Cut Pro had been the most popular. Just like performing a digital intermediate with 35mm film, any on-line editing system that can access DPX, TIFF or Cineon file types can be used to on-line the 4K images captured with the Origin II.

== Availability ==
The Dalsa Origin II is no longer available. Dalsa discontinued the Digital Cinema division in 2008. The Origin II was available via a rental-only model similar to Panavision.

== See also ==
- Arriflex D-20
- Genesis (Panavision)
- RED Digital Cinema
- Codex Digital
