= CKS =

CKS may refer to:

== Transport ==
- Clarkston railway station, which has the National Rail code CKS
- The former IATA airport code for Taiwan Taoyuan International Airport (IATA: TPE), which was formerly known as Chiang Kai-shek International Airport
- The ICAO code for Kalitta Air
- Chu Kong Passenger Transport Co., Ltd (CKS), a Hong Kong ferry company

== Other uses ==
- CKS Group, an American advertising company
- Checksum, to detect data errors
- Chiang Kai-shek (1887–1975), Chinese politician and military leader
- Chiyoda Kogaku Seiko, a Japanese camera manufacturer
- Ciné-Kodak Special, a series of video cameras (made 1930s–1960s)
