= Edmund DiGiulio =

Edmund DiGiulio (June 13, 1927 – June 4, 2004) was an American technical innovator who founded Cinema Products Corporation that developed the Steadicam, CP-16, and won multiple Academy Scientific and Technical Awards as well as the Gordon E. Sawyer Award for his contributions to motion picture technology in 2001.

== Biography ==
DiGiulio received his B.S. from Columbia School of Engineering and Applied Science in 1950. After graduation, he spent 10 years working for IBM. He later landed a job at Mitchell Camera, where he helped smooth out the motors for zoom lenses. He then started his own company, Cinema Products Corporation, and developed a through-the-lens viewing system for 35-mm studio cameras, for which he won an Engineering and Scientific Award from the Academy of Motion Picture Arts and Sciences in 1969.

As head of Cinema Products Corporation, he oversaw the development of Steadicam, invented by Garrett Brown, who licensed the company to develop and manufacture the product. Brown and the staff won another Scientific and Engineering Award in 1978. He was credited for developing the CP-16 that were widely used by television journalists and was the technique behind The Blair Witch Project in 1999.

He worked with director Stanley Kubrick to develop the special cinematic effects for Barry Lyndon, The Shining, and A Clockwork Orange. He also developed a camera system used in the film adaption of the musical Stop the World – I Want to Get Off.

In 1992, he won the Scientific and Engineering Award a second time for the camera system design of the CP-65 showcase camera system for 65mm motion picture photography. He received a Technical Achievement Award in 1998 for the design of the KeyKode Sync Reader. He won the John A. Bonner Medal of Commendation in 1999 for "outstanding service and dedication in upholding the high standards of the Academy of Motion Picture Arts and Sciences."

DiGiulio was a five-time chairman of The Scientific and Technical Awards Committee of the Academy of Motion Picture Arts and Sciences. At the Oscar ceremonies in 2001, he received the Gordon E. Sawyer Lifetime Achievement Award for technological advances.

He was a fellow of the Society of Motion Picture and Television Engineers, and a fellow of the British Kinematograph, Sound and Television Society.

== Personal life ==
DiGiulio died on June 4, 2004, at 76. He is survived by his wife, Louise; a daughter, Amanda Richmond; and one granddaughter. In 2004, he was named one of "The 250 Greatest Columbia Alumni" by the Columbia Daily Spectator.
