= John A. Bonner Medal of Commendation =

Scientific and Technical Service Award
- Awarded for: Outstanding service and dedication in upholding the high standards of the Academy
- Country: United States
- Presented by: Academy Board of Governors
- Formerly called: Medal of Commendation, John A. Bonner Medal of Commendation
- First award: 1977
- Website: www.oscars.org/sci-tech-awards/scientific-and-technical-service-award

The Academy of Motion Picture Arts and Sciences awards the Scientific and Technical Service Award upon the recommendation of its Scientific and Technical Awards Committee. The medal is awarded with a citation reading "in appreciation for outstanding service and dedication in upholding the high standards of the Academy." It was first given at the 50th Academy Awards in April 1978, and is given irregularly.

== Naming ==
The medal was originally called the Medal of Commendation. In 1997 it was named the John A. Bonner Medal of Commendation, in honor of the American sound engineer John A. Bonner who served for several years as the governor of the academy's Sound Branch; and as chair of its Scientific and Technical Awards Committee and its Theater Sound Inspection Committee. Bonner had also been the director of special projects at Warner-Hollywood Studios. The president of the Academy of Motion Picture Arts and Sciences, Arthur Hiller said that no person "...better represents the concept of service and dedication to the Academy" than Bonner and that he was "...dedicated to the Academy for more than 30 years. His devotion to the Academy's Samuel Goldwyn Theater was legendary and his commitment to the Academy was simply extraordinary." From 2025 the award was given the name Scientific and Technical Service Award.

== Recipients ==
- 1977 (50th) – Gordon E. Sawyer and Sidney Paul Solow
- 1978 (51st) – John O. Aalberg, Linwood G. Dunn, Loren L. Ryder and Waldon O. Watson
- 1979 (52nd) – Charles G. Clarke and John G. Frayne
- 1980 (53rd) – Fred Hynes
- 1985 (58th) – John H. Whitney, Sr.
- 1986 (59th) – E. M. (Al) Lewis
- 1990 (63rd) – Roderick T. Ryan, Don Trumbull and Geoffrey H. Williamson
- 1991 (64th) – Richard J. Stumpf and Joseph Westheimer
- 1992 (65th) – Petro Vlahos
- 1994 (67th) – John A. Bonner
- 1996 (69th) – Volker Bahnemann and Burton "Bud" Stone
- 1997 (70th) – Pete Clark
- 1998 (71st) – David W. Gray
- 1999 (72nd) – Edmund M. DiGiulio and Takuo Miyagishima
- 2000 (73rd) – N. Paul Kenworthy, Jr.
- 2001 (74th) – Ray Feeney
- 2002 (75th) – Curt Behlmer and Richard Glickman
- 2003 (76th) – Douglass Greenfield
- 2005 (78th) – Don Hall
- 2006 (79th) – Richard Edlund
- 2007 (80th) – David Inglish
- 2008 (81st) – Mark Kimball
- 2010 (83rd) – Denny Clairmont
- 2011 (84th) – Jonathan Erland
- 2012 (85th) – Bill Taylor
- 2013 (86th) – Charles "Tad" Marburg
- 2018 (91st) – Curtis Clark

== See also ==
- Category:Recipients of the John A. Bonner Medal of Commendation
