= S-mount =

S-mount may refer to:

- Kodak S-mount, a combined bayonet and thread lens mount for ciné lenses and cameras between 1948 and 1961
- Nikon S-mount, a dual-bayonet lens mount used for a range of Nikon rangefinder cameras between 1948 and 2005
- Leica S-mount, a fully electronic bayonet lens mount used for Leica medium-format SLRs such as the S2 since 2008
- S-mount (CCTV lens), a threaded lens mount for CCTV lenses and webcams

== See also ==
- Sigma SA-mount
