= Bill Taylor (visual effects artist) =

American visual effects artist

- Born: July 5, 1944; Philadelphia, Pennsylvania, U.S.
- Died: August 22, 2021 (aged 77)
- Occupation: Visual effects artist

Bill Taylor (July 5, 1944 – August 22, 2021) was an American visual effects artist. He won a Primetime Emmy Award and was nominated for two more in the category Outstanding Special Visual Effects for his work on the television programs A.D. and Star Trek: The Next Generation.

In 2013, Taylor was awarded the John A. Bonner Medal of Commendation by the Academy of Motion Picture Arts and Sciences.

Taylor died on August 22, 2021, at the age of 77.
