= Ciné-Kodak =

First 16 mm camera

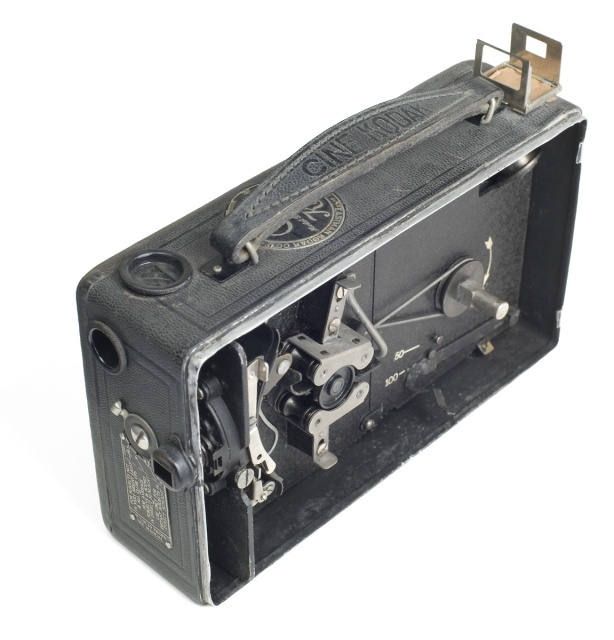
Open view of the earliest version of the Ciné Kodak Model B

The Ciné-Kodak was the first movie camera for 16 mm, manufactured by the Eastman Kodak Company and introduced in 1923. It was intended for home movie making. Kodak released additional models, including magazine-loading cameras as the Magazine Ciné-Kodak line and a line of 8 mm cameras under the Ciné-Kodak Eight sub-brand. The final 16 mm camera was the Kodak Reflex Special, released in 1961, dropping the Ciné-Kodak brand altogether; Kodak ceased production of 16 mm cameras in 1968, but continued to produce 8 mm and Super 8 film cameras under the Ektasound and Instamatic brands.

== History and models ==
Kodak introduced 16 mm film in June 1923 alongside the first Ciné-Kodak, a movie camera that was both more portable and affordable than those using 35 mm film; the new camera and film type were more suited for amateur use and generally are credited as the enabling technology for the creation of the first home movies.

=== Lettered models ===
The initial prototype was a leather covered rectangular wooden box, which evolved into a cast aluminum box when the camera was released, approximately 8×8.5×4.5 in (200×220×110 mm) (H×L×W). The first Ciné-Kodak was cranked by hand at two turns per second to achieve the necessary 16 frames per second. Hand cranking meant that a tripod was essential to achieve a steady image. The camera was equipped with a fixed 1-inch (25mm) lens. Early in 1924 a battery-powered electric motor attachment was introduced, but this accessory was discontinued in 1926, at which time an improved version of the camera with an interchangeable Kodak Anastigmat f/1.9 lens was introduced. The lens focal range was 2 to 50 feet and INF (infinity). The only additional lens offered was a 78mm f/4.5 telephoto. With the discontinuation of the motor, additional crank accessories were introduced: one for single frames, and one with a 4:1 gear ratio for slow motion work.

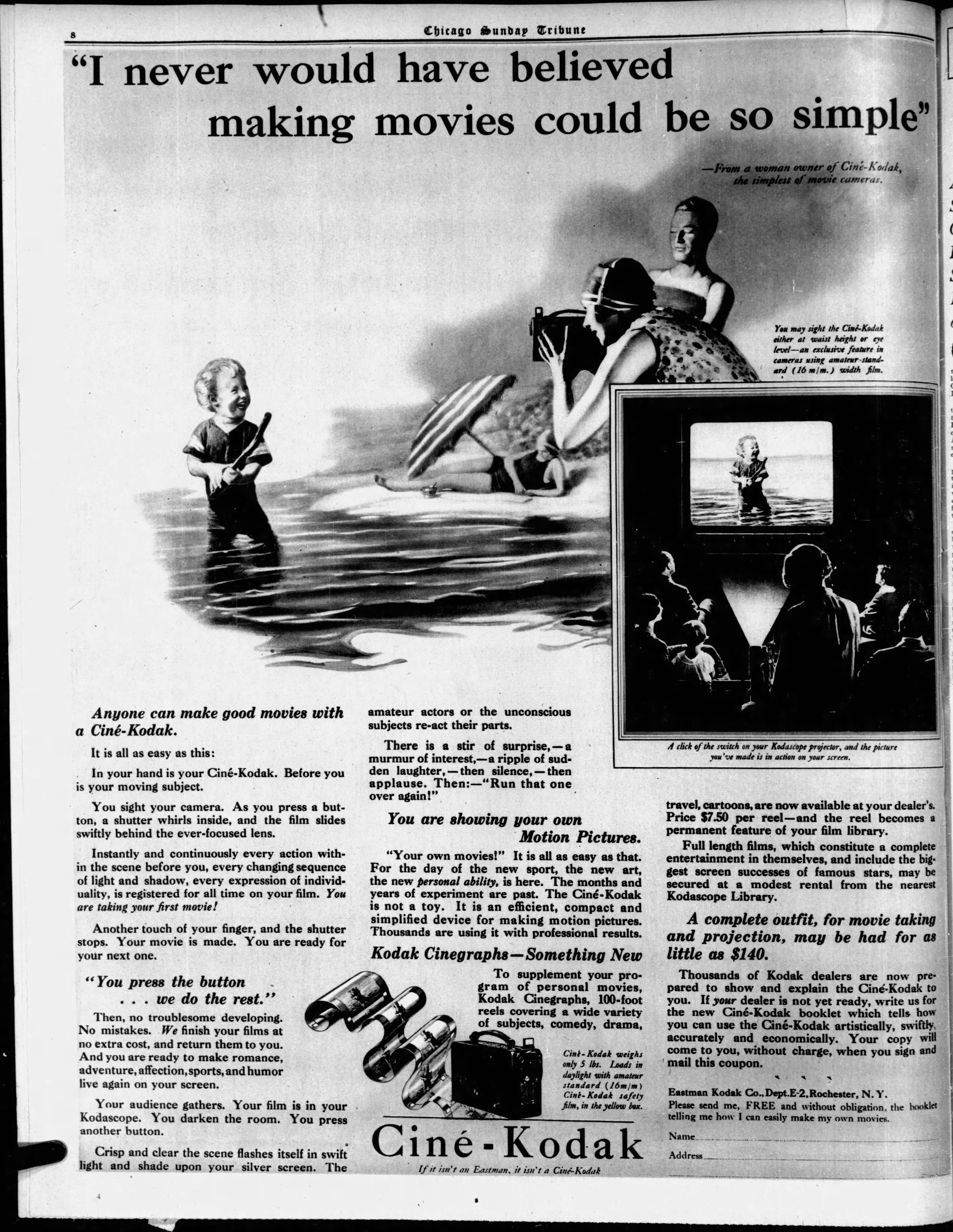
June 12, 1927 full-page advertisement in the Chicago Tribune

In 1925, Kodak followed with a spring motor-driven Ciné-Kodak Model B, at which time the original Ciné-Kodak was re-designated as Model A, though that designation was not added to the camera nameplate until November 1929. A full winding of the spring would run the Model B motor for about fifteen to twenty feet of film. The Model B was available with fixed-focus f/6.5 and f/3.5 lenses, along with a version with a focusing f/1.9 lens; these cameras were intended for the amateur, while the Model A was retained as suitable for the advanced amateur. Special Editions of the Model B were released with ostrich leather covering the camera body and carrying case. In 1927, the Kodak list prices for Ciné-Kodak ranged from US$225 (equivalent to $4,170 in 2025) for the Model A with f/1.9 lens and tripod to US$75 (equivalent to $1,390 in 2025) for the Model B with f/6.5 lens. Production of Model A ceased in 1930; the Model B in 1931.

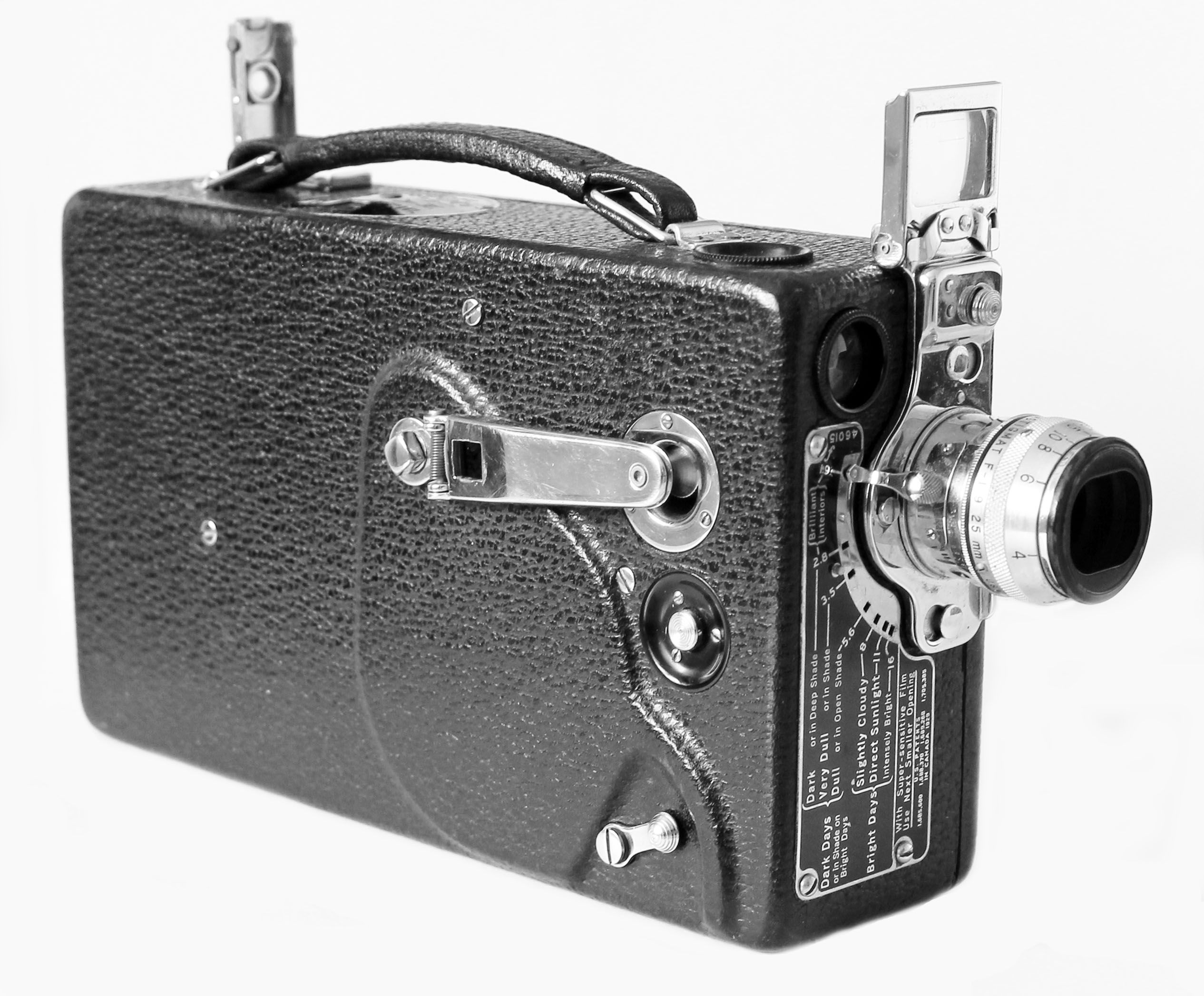
Ciné-Kodak Model K; open viewfinder alongside handle

In 1929, a Model BB for 50-foot reels and an additional 8 frames/second speed was introduced, followed by the Model K in 1930, which was an enlarged BB for 100-ft reels. As furnished with a f/3.5 Anastigmat lens, in 1934 the Model K was listed at US$112.50 (equivalent to $2,710 in 2025). The Model K was joined briefly by a stripped-down Model M, but the latter camera did not sell well since it lacked some of the very features that made the Model K appealing.

In 1937, the Model E was introduced with a shape similar to the later Pathé Webo camera and provided slow motion speeds and an internal viewfinder instead of the open frame types used hitherto.

=== End of production ===
The final 16 mm spool loading camera, the Ciné-Kodak Model K-100, arrived in 1955 in both three-lens turret and non-turret versions, using the Bell & Howell-developed C mount for interchangeable lenses. In 1961, Kodak dropped the Ciné-Kodak branding, releasing the Kodak Reflex Special to compete with the Arriflex 16ST, featuring continuous reflex viewing; this last 16 mm camera manufactured by Kodak did not sell well and was discontinued in 1968.

The 16 mm Ciné-Kodaks were well-made, long-lived cameras. Most have double claws and double sprockets and hence require double perf (2R) film in unmodified form. The exceptions are both the Specials and K100 models that were designed for single perf (1R) film, which allowed for the addition of sound tracks.

=== Professional cameras ===
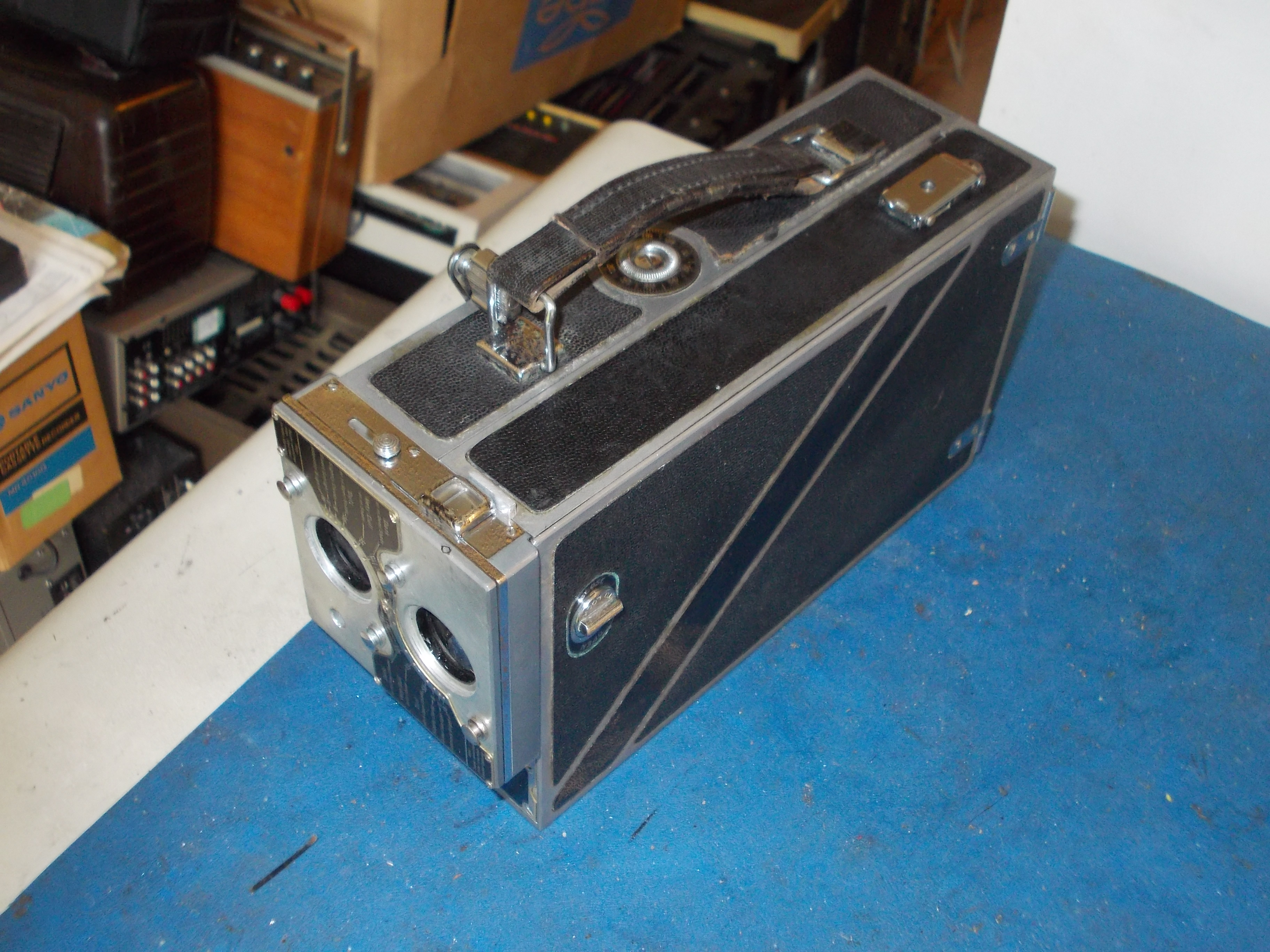
Ciné-Kodak Special, without lenses

In 1933, the Ciné-Kodak Special was introduced for advanced amateur and semi-professional work, and quickly became popular with professionals for its vast range of capabilities. A new universal Kodak S-mount was introduced with this camera, although the Special required an adapter to use S-mount lenses.

The Ciné-Kodak Special II was introduced in 1948 with a diverging turret to allow for mounting a longer second lens without interfering with the field of view of the shorter focal length, but was otherwise unchanged from the Special. The Special II was discontinued in 1961.

=== Magazine cameras ===
Kodak released the first of a line of magazine-loading cameras sold under the Magazine Ciné-Kodak sub-brand in 1936, made initially in Kodak's Nagel Works in Germany. Like the Model E, the initial Magazine Ciné-Kodak included 1/2× and 1/4× slow-motion speeds (32 and 64 fps). This was superseded by the Ciné-Kodak Magazine 16 (1945–1950), which had few differences, and the Ciné-Kodak Royal Magazine (1950), which featured an enclosed viewfinder.

=== 8mm cameras ===
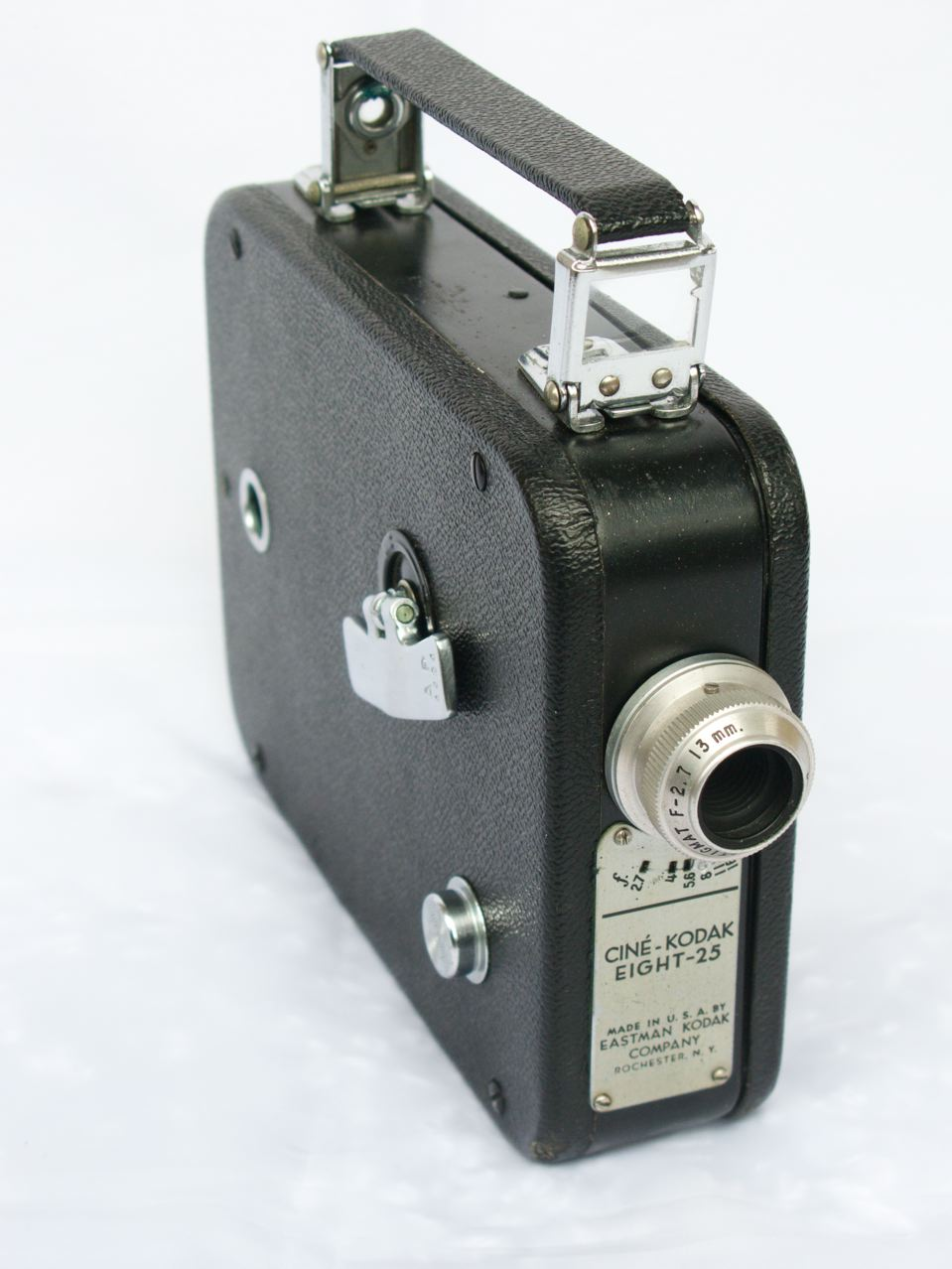
Ciné-Kodak Eight, Model 25; open viewfinder built into handle

Kodak also sold 8 mm movie cameras starting from 1932 under the Ciné-Kodak Eight sub-brand. The first Eights included the Ciné-Kodak Eight, Model 20, which had a 13 mm (1/2-in) f/3.5 lens; the Model 25, which closely resembled the 20, but was equipped with a faster f/2.7 lens; and the Model 60, which had an even faster f/1.9 lens which could be exchanged for a 1 1/2-in (38 mm) f/4.5 telephoto lens. The lower price of the Model 20 opened home movie production to a broader market, listing for US$34.50 (equivalent to $830 in 2025) in 1934. The Ciné-Kodak Eights used double-run 8 mm film, which exposed first one half, then after the take-up reel was swapped with the supply reel, the other half of 16 mm-wide film, otherwise identical to standard 16 mm double-perf film, but with twice the number of sprocket holes; after developing, the processor would split the film and splice it together.

The next major development was the introduction of magazine loading, with the Magazine Ciné-Kodak Eight, Model 90, introduced in 1940, sharing the same lens mount with the 16 mm Magazine Ciné-Kodak; the Model 90 was replaced by the Ciné-Kodak Magazine 8 in 1946, which had only minor cosmetic upgrades from the Model 90. The Magazine 8 was discontinued in 1948.

During the 1950s, Kodak continued to produce simple double-run 8 mm movie cameras with fixed lenses under the venerable Brownie name. In 1965, Kodak introduced the Super 8 film format along with a line of Instamatic-branded Super 8 cameras, replacing the older Ciné-Kodak Eight and Brownie movie cameras.

Ciné-Kodak 16 & 8 mm cameras
Model		Years	Lens(es)		Crank	Dimensions		Notes
Model		Years	Focal lengths	Mount	Crank	L×H×W	Wgt	Notes
(A)		1923–1930	25 mm f/3.5 (Note: Fixed lens); 25 mm f/1.9	—N/a	Manual (2 rev/s)	8 5/8×8×4 5/8 in (220×200×120 mm)	7 1/4 lb (3.3 kg) loaded	The original Ciné-Kodak was designated Model A in 1925 after the Model B was released.
(A)		1923–1930	25 mm f/1.9 Anastigmat (Note: Interchangeable lens, model-specific lens mount); 78 mm f/4.5	"Model A" (Note: Threaded mount)	Manual (2 rev/s)	8 5/8×8×4 5/8 in (220×200×120 mm)	7 1/4 lb (3.3 kg) loaded	Lenses were made interchangeable starting in 1927.
B		1925–1931	20 mm f/6.5; 20 mm f/3.5; 25 mm f/1.9	—N/a	Spring	8 13/16×5 9/16×3 1/16 in (224×141×78 mm)	5 lb (2.3 kg) loaded	The early f/1.9 camera had a removable lens.
B		1925–1931	25 mm f/1.9 Anastigmat; 78 mm f/4.5	"Model B" (Note: Lenses are permanently fixed to a tri-lobed mounting plate with three bosses which engage corresponding holes in the body.)	Spring	8 13/16×5 9/16×3 1/16 in (224×141×78 mm)	5 lb (2.3 kg) loaded	Interchangeable lenses introduced in 1928.
BB		1929–1932	25 mm f/3.5 (Note: Interchangeable lens, Model K mount); 25 mm f/1.9; 78 mm f/4.5	"Model K" (Note: Doug Kerr calls this the "three stud keyhole" variant.)	Spring	8 3/8×4 11/16×2 7/16 in (213×119×62 mm)	3 lb 3 1/2 oz (1.46 kg) unloaded	Limited to 50-foot rolls of film only
K		1930–1946	25 mm f/3.5; 25 mm f/1.9; 78 mm f/4.5; 114 mm f/4.5	"Model K"	Spring	9 3/8×5×2 5/8 in (238×127×67 mm)	3 lb 11 1/2 oz (1.69 kg) unloaded	By 1934, lenses with 15 mm, 1-in, 2-in, 3-in, 4 1/2-in, and 6-in focal lengths were available.
M		1931–1934	20 mm f/3.5	—N/a	Spring	9×5×2 5/8 in (229×127×67 mm)	3 lb 6 5/8 oz (1.55 kg) unloaded	
Eight	Model 20	1932–?	13 mm f/3.5	—N/a	Spring	?	?	
Eight	Model 25	1933–1946	13 mm f/2.7	—N/a	Spring	?	?	
Eight	Model 60	1932–1947	13 mm f/1.9; 38 mm f/4.5	model-specific (Note: Doug Kerr calls this the "two-stud vertical keyhole" variant.)	Spring	?	?	
Eight	Magazine Model 90, Magazine Eight	1940–1946 (1948)	19 mm f/1.9 (Note: Interchangeable lens, Type M mount; additional focal lengths available from 15 to 152 mm)	Type M (Note: Two-pin bayonet mount with a protruding locking tab; this tab has a hole for a spring-loaded plunger in the body. Several variations were released.)	Spring	?	?	
Magazine	(plain)	1936–1945 (1950)	25 mm f/1.9	Type M	Spring	?	?	Full name is "Magazine Ciné-Kodak"
Magazine	16	1945–1950	25 mm f/1.9	Type M	Spring	?	?	
Magazine	Royal	1950–1954	25 mm f/1.7	Type M	Spring	?	?	
Special		1933–?	25 mm f/1.9	"Type P" (Note: Doug Kerr calls this the "two-stud oblique keyhole" variant"; lenses are permanently mounted on a two-part mounting plate with a flip-up lens to complete the viewfinder optics.)	Spring	?	?	
E		1937–1946	20 mm f/3.5; 25 mm f/1.9	"Type A" (Note: Said to be indistinguishable from C mount)	Spring	?	?	
Special II		1948–1961	25 mm f/1.9 (Note: Interchangeable lens, Type S mount; additional focal lengths available from 15 to 152 mm, adaptors available for S mount lenses on Model K/BB, Magazine (Type M mount), Ciné-Kodak Special I mount, C mount, and D mount)	Type S	Spring	?	?	
K-100 / K-100T		1955–1961	25 mm f/1.9 (Note: Interchangeable lens, C mount)	C	Spring	?	?	
Reflex Special		1961–1968	25 mm f/1.9 (Note: Interchangeable lens, R mount)	R mount	Electric	?	?	

== See also ==
- History of photography
- History of the camera
