= Donald C. Rogers =

American sound engineer

- Rogers in 2019
- Born: Donald Clark Rogers; May 4, 1931; California, U.S.
- Died: January 4, 2026 (aged 94); Salem, Oregon, U.S.
- Education: University of California, Santa Barbara
- Occupation: Sound engineer

Donald Clark Rogers (May 4, 1931 – January 4, 2026), also known as The Godfather of Modern Picture Sound, was an American sound engineer. He was best known for his sound directing work in the films Rocky (and its sequels Rocky III, Rocky IV and Rocky V), Star Trek: The Motion Picture, Little Shop of Horrors, Dune, Ferris Bueller's Day Off and The Shawshank Redemption.

At the 68th Academy Awards, he was awarded the Gordon E. Sawyer Award by the Academy of Motion Picture Arts and Sciences.

Rogers died on January 4, 2026 in Salem, Oregon, at the age of 94.

At the 98th Academy Awards, his name was mentioned in the In Memoriam section.
