= Cinema Products Corporation =

American manufacturer of motion picture camera equipment

Cinema Products Corporation was an American manufacturer of motion picture camera equipment.

== History ==
The company was formed in 1968 by Ed DiGiulio, a former director and vice-president of the Mitchell Camera Corporation. Their first product was a Silent Pellicle Reflex conversion of the Mitchell BNC 35 mm Motion picture camera.

The company expanded into the 16-millimeter news camera market with the introduction of the CP-16.

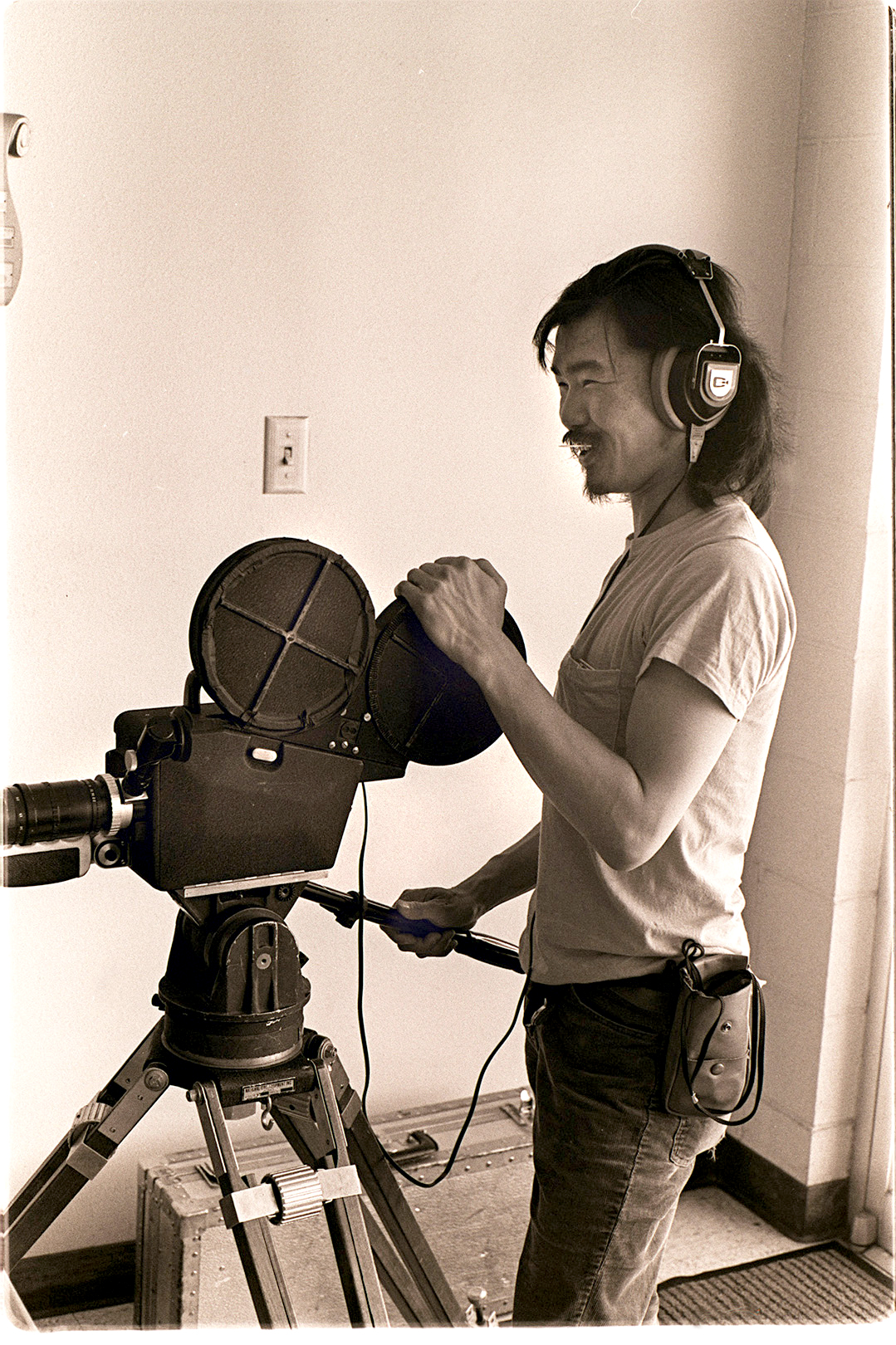
Documentary director Curtis Choy films with a CP-16.

The CP16 was based on the film advance mechanism used in the older "Bach-Auricon" sound-on-film cameras, but reconfigured in a lighter, more ergonomic self-blimped body configuration. It became one of the most widely used sound-on-film cameras in the TV news industry until it began to be superseded by the color professional video formats of the late 1970s. (3/4 inch field decks and the early Betacam and M-format component analog tape systems.)

== Academy Award ==
In the 50th Academy Awards, Garrett Brown and the Cinema Products Corporation Engineering Staff under the supervision of John Jurgens received a Scientific or Technical Award, Class I for the invention and development of the Steadicam.

== Products ==
=== XR35 ===
In motion picture equipment, the Mitchell BNC conversion to reflex was followed by the studio quiet XR35. The Cinema Products XR35 had a Mitchell NC camera inside a lightweight housing or blimp. The blimp was so close in size to the original camera, it looked small compared to the blimps made for Mitchell or Arriflex cameras. The XR35 was a crystal-controlled 35mm motion picture camera considerably lighter than the Hollywood studio–owned blimped Mitchells. The X stood for crystal, the R for reflex. The reflex system was based on a spinning mirror shutter. During the mirrors' revolution at one point the film would be exposed, then the operator would view the image in the mirror as the film was advanced to the next frame, at 24 times a second. Cinema Products did their best to buy up all available 35mm Mitchell NC cameras on the market as the XR went into production. Later, Cinema Products sold their remaining Mitchell inventory to a Japanese company when the XR35 was challenged by competitors but still selling well.

In 1972, Panavision and ARRI came to market with their lighter-weight 35mm cameras. Panavision's Panaflex and the Arriflex 35BL. These cameras were not blimped in the sense they had a camera in a housing; these cameras were designed from the ground up to be quiet.

The light and ergonomic Arri 35BL-I gave European film makers (and eventually the American "Brats"), the ability to shoot studio-quality (double system) sync sound movies, but faster, on real locations – and even handheld – and with smaller crews and support equipment. (Due to the limited resources of the 1940s and 1950s the Italian Neo realists and French New Wave had evolved around the approach of shooting wild synch or "Noisy-synch" and then completely post-replacing all sound and dialog.) In America, The Panaflex became the industry standard motion picture camera, displacing the Mitchell legacy.

=== GSMO ===
The studio quiet 16mm Cinema Products GSMO was introduced in the mid-1970s. It had quick loading coaxial magazines, an 'in camera' light meter viewable in the eyepiece and an on-camera battery. The GSMO stood for "gun sight man operated". (Cinema Products would often develop products under government contracts, then adapt them for industry wide marketing.)

The GSMO was popular among documentarians and low-budget independent producers. Jon Jost produced feature films shot with the GSMO. The PBS documentary film Post No Bills was also shot by Clay Walker using Jost's GSMO camera.

The GSMO had crystal speeds of 12, 16, 24, 25, 32, 48, 64 FPS. Besides the standard 400-foot magazine, the GSMO offered a novel and rare 100-foot magazine. The 100-foot mag was the height of the camera, so the camera with mag would be only 5 inches tall. The GSMO did not have video assist, a way of viewing what the cameraman was seeing on a video screen. TV commercial producers and directors wanted video assist, and the GSMO fell behind the competition in that feature. (After-market video assist is now available for the GSMO).

-

=== Rare lens ===
During pre-production for the 1975 film "Barry Lyndon", director-producer Stanley Kubrick had a requirement for a large aperture "high speed" cine lens to facilitate shooting scenes by candlelight. At the time, the largest aperture "fastest" cine lenses available for reflex 35mm cine cameras had a f1.4 aperture. High Speed (also called "Super Speed") f1.2 prime lenses were not available at the time.

Kubrick sourced a Carl Zeiss Planar f0.7/50mm lens, an aperture two f-stops larger than f1.4. This was a still camera lens originally developed by Carl Zeiss for NASA's Apollo program. Ed DiGiulio reluctantly agreed to take on the very difficult process of adapting this lens to a cine camera, which required modifying the lens and permanently modifying a Mitchell BNC camera to work with this lens.

Director of photography John Alcott was honored at the 48th Academy Awards with the Best Cinematography award for his work on Barry Lyndon. One of the modified Mitchell BNC cameras, and two of the modified f0.7 lenses are on display with the Stanley Kubrick Exhibition.

=== CP35 ===
In the early 1980s, Cinema Products introduced the CP35, a nonquiet 35mm camera. With a BNCR lens mount, it was to partner with the studio quiet XR35 that had the same BNCR mount. The CP35 had video assist, but it was not as integrally designed as the competition's. The CP35 had multiple crystal speeds like the GSMO ranging from 6 to 120FPS.

=== FX35 ===
The FX35 was introduced in 1987. It had a wider body but resembled the CP35. They shared magazines. The FX35 had integral video assist. It used the PL lens mount Arriflex had introduced. The camera's electronics were cutting edge for the day with special effects and motion control underlining the electronics design. From the switch-mode power supply to the 36-pin computer interface, the FX35 offered features unavailable on cameras at that time. The speeds were thumb-wheel selected in .01 increments. A CRT computer monitor with 72.06 hertz could be filmed with no roll bar, the black bar visible when a 24 or 25 FPS camera records a TV or computer monitor due to the difference in refresh rates. The FX35 was originally designed for a motion picture and video camera rental company in Great Britain. The production rights and remaining inventory of the CP35 and FX35 were sold to Redicam in 1992.

In its last years, Cinema Products was still innovative. A film to HD video transfer machine was introduced, novel in that the HD camera was not part of the transfer machine but mounted on it. An upgrade would be easy, just change the HD camera, the film transport deck stayed the same. A fiber optic–based 35 mm ground glass to video chip reducer was patented and sold to a competitor. A consumer-oriented Steadicam unit designed for small mini DV cameras was added to the Steadicam line. The Steadicam Jr. incorporated an 8-layer non-glare LCD video monitor comparable to the professional Steadicam rigs. The Steadicam line became the company's leading marketable product. Tiffen Filter bought the rights to make the Steadicam when Cinema Products Corporation went out of business in 2000.
