= Codex Digital =

Manufacturer of digital production workflow tools

- Company type: Private
- Industry: Motion picture equipment
- Headquarters: London, UK
- Products: Camera recording engines Data processing solutions Software tools Storage technologies
- Website: codex.online

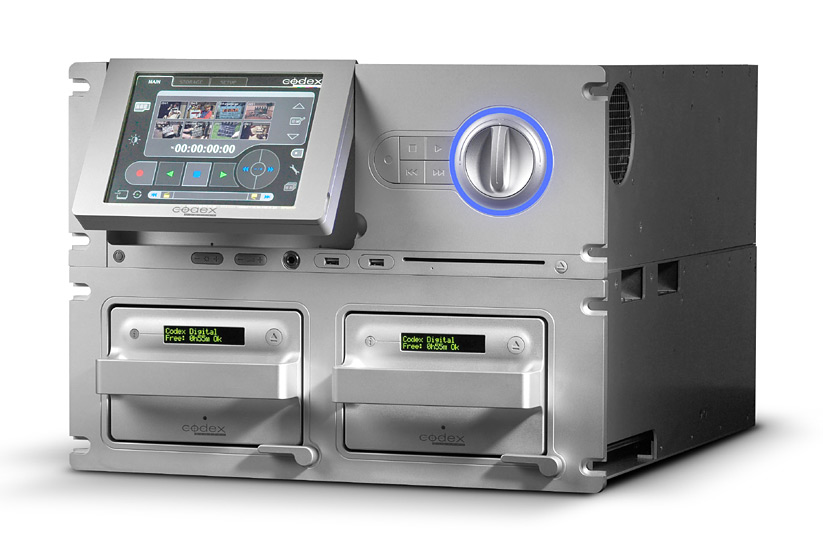
The Codex high-resolution media recorder

Codex Digital is a company that creates digital production workflow tools for motion pictures, commercials, independent films, and TV productions.

Codex products include recorders and media processing systems, as well as tools for color, dailies creation, archiving, review and digital asset management.

Codex is based in London, UK, with offices in Los Angeles, CA and Wellington, NZ.

In April, 2019, Codex was acquired by PIX System - designer of the PIX app for online collaboration and based in San Francisco, California.

== Products ==
Codex was founded in 2005, and its first product was the Codex Studio recorder. It was introduced in 2005 and was used as the capture device for early digital cameras such as the Dalsa Origin, Thomson Viper, Panavision Genesis, and Sony F23 & F35. This was followed in 2007 by the Codex Portable Recorder, and by the Codex Onboard Recorder in 2010. Codex continued to work on miniaturizing its technology, partnering with ARRI to deliver its recording technology, integrated inside the ALEXA XT camera.

Codex XR capture drives at up to 800 MB/s. The technology was subsequently upgraded to support the requirements of the ALEXA 65 camera, with Codex SXR capture drives able to sustain 2500 MB/s.

Codex has continued to support ARRI with built-in recording for the ALEXA SXT and ALEXA LF cameras. They also partnered with Canon on an integrated recording product for the Canon C700 camera and with Panasonic on the VariCam Pure camera. In 2014, Codex also launched Codex Action Cam, a RAW-capable, tiny camera head, designed as a POV, Action or Witness camera.

Codex uses a "Virtual File System", meaning that when the recorded files are accessed, they can be viewed in a number of different resolutions and formats.

Codex products have been used in the production of motion pictures. Projects that used Codex products include Tim Burton's "Alice in Wonderland," Michael Apted's "The Chronicles of Narnia: The Voyage of the Dawn Treader", Joseph Kosinski's "Tron Legacy", Roland Emmerich's "Anonymous", and Ang Lee's "Life of Pi." Recent Academy Awards for Best Cinematography predominately using digital capture have used Codex recording, including "Gravity", "Blade Runner 2049", "The Revenant", and "Roma."

The first cameras Codex supported were the ARRI Alexa, the Sony CineAlta series, the Panavision Genesis and the Arriflex D-21. They recorded twin 4:4:4 dual-link HD-SDI inputs for A & B camera or stereoscopic 3D work at up to 16-bits colour depth.

Codex products used a touchscreen interface and removable "data packs" containing up to 10 TB of raid array disk storage. Interfaces for digital cinematography cameras include single and dual-link HD-SDI and Infiniband.

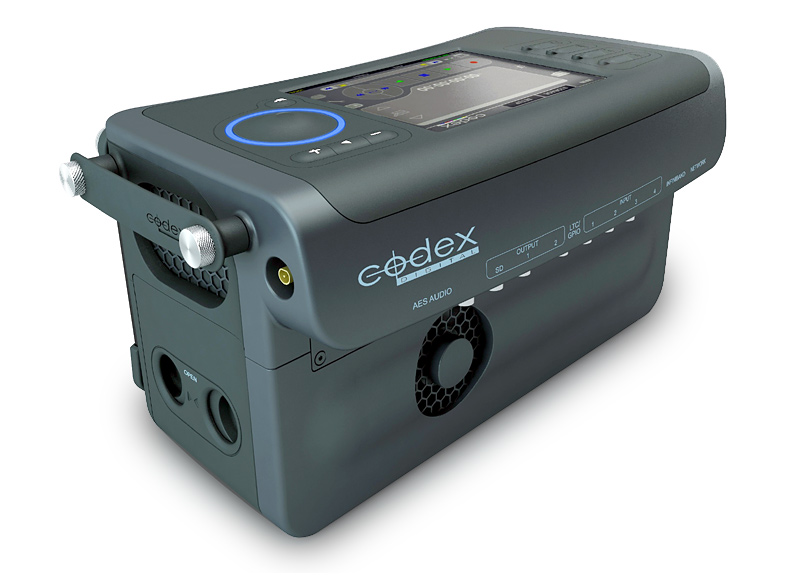
The Codex portable recorder

In 2007, the Codex portable recording system was released.

In 2010 the Codex onboard recording system was released. Based on the larger Codex portable recorder, it was a compact, battery-powered variant which offers uncompressed and wavelet-based recording. The recorder mounts directly on the camera and weighs 2.5 kg.

Codex's line of products include Vault, introduced in 2012. Vault is an ingest, processing and hardware device, designed to support multiple camera and media types.

== Company history ==
In 2005, Codex introduced the Codex Studio recorder as its first product. In 2012, Codex introduced the Onboard M recorder, the first to be certified by ARRI to record ARRIRAW from the ARRI Alexa camera.

In 2014, ARRI Alexa 65 with Codex drives and workflow was announced. Codex handles camera processing in Vault hardware. Additionally, in 2014, Codex launched Action CAM – a RAW recording, and POV camera.

Codex was acquired by PIX System in 2019.

== See also ==
- Arriflex Alexa
- Arriflex D-21
- Panavision Genesis
- RED Digital Cinema
