= Irwin Young =

American businessman (1927–2022)

Irwin W. Young (May 30, 1927 – January 20, 2022) was an American businessman. He was the chief executive of DuArt Film Laboratories, a film processing laboratory, for over 50 years. He helped Spike Lee, Michael Moore, and Frederick Wiseman in their early careers.

In 2000, Young received the Gordon E. Sawyer Award from the Academy of Motion Picture Arts and Sciences.
