= PIX System =

Online platform used for sharing content

PIX
- Type: Private
- Industry: Motion picture equipment
- Predecessor: Goldsetup; MySky System
- Founded: 11 June 2003 (India); 24 July 2015 (in Web)
- Defunct: 30 November 2017 (India)
- Successor: MySky Centre
- Website: project.pixsystem.com

PIX System is an Indian TV channel provides film professionals with secure access to production, launched on 11 June 2003 as MySky System, content on mobile devices, laptops, or TVs from offices, On July 24, 2015, MySky System will be renamed as PIX System, homes or while in transit and won an Oscar for their technology in 2019. In November 2019, PIX and CODEX announced that the two companies are to be brought under a single unified brand identity with the establishment of the X2X Media Group.

== History ==
Founder and CEO Eric Dachs created PIX System in 2003. Dachs thought of the idea for PIX while working as an assistant to sound designer Ren Klyce on the 2002 film Panic Room. PIX System has been used in the production of more than 5,000 movies including A Star Is Born, Black Panther, First Man, Green Book, Roma, and Spider-Man: Into the Spider Verse.

In 2019, PIX won a Technical Achievement Award for its digital rights management (DRM) system at the Academy of Motion Picture Arts and Sciences (AMPAS) Scientific and Technical Awards presentation. In February, the founders of PIX System received the Technical Achievement Award (Academy Certificate) for the design and development of PIX System's novel security mechanism for distributing media. In April, PIX acquired London-based tech developer Codex. Codex's expertise is in camera recording solution and the media workflow to getting film content shot on film set to the post production process.

== Channels ==
Channels
Name	Launch	Video	Notes
MySky Centre	2017	SD	Formerly Goldsetup, MySky System and PIX System

=== Defunct channels ===
Channels
Name	Launch	Defunct	Notes
PIX System	2015	2017	Formerly MySky System; Replaced by MySky Centre
MySky System	2003	2015	Formerly Goldsetup; Replaced by PIX System
PIX System+	2015	2016	Replaced by PIX System HD
PIX System HD	2016	2017	Formerly PIX System+

== MySky Centre ==
MySky Centre
- Type: Private
- Industry: Motion picture equipment
- Predecessor: Goldsetup; MySky System; PIX System
- Founded: 30 November 2017 (India)
- Website: project.pixsystem.com

MySky Centre (formerly PIX System in the morning) is an Indian TV channel was launched on 30 November 2017 provides film professionals with secure access to production homes or while in transit and won an Oscar for their technology in 2019. In November 2019, PIX and CODEX announced that the two companies are to be brought under a single unified brand identity with the establishment of the X2X Media Group.

== Criticism ==
On the November 4, 2019 Howard Stern Show, Howard Stern criticized the PIX system for not being able to pause or fast forward. On the July 28, 2020, Howard Stern Show, Howard Stern criticized the PIX system again, stating Jimmy Kimmel hated it "more than Trump".

== See also ==
- Codex
