= Gordon E. Sawyer Award =

Award for technological contributions

- Awarded for: "an individual in the motion picture industry whose technological contributions have brought credit to the industry"
- Country: United States
- Presented by: Academy of Motion Picture Arts and Sciences (AMPAS)
- First award: 1981
- Website: oscars.org

The Gordon E. Sawyer Award is an Honorary Award given by the Academy of Motion Picture Arts and Sciences to "an individual in the motion picture industry whose technological contributions have brought credit to the industry." The award is named in honour of Gordon E. Sawyer, the former Sound Director at Samuel Goldwyn Studio and three-time Academy Award winner who claimed that a listing of past Academy Awards, arranged both chronologically and by category, represents a history of the development of motion pictures. It was first presented at the 54th Academy Awards, in April 1982. The Gordon E. Sawyer Award is voted upon and given by the Scientific and Technical Awards Committee of the Academy.

== Recipients ==
- 1981 (54th) Joseph Walker
- 1982 (55th) John O. Aalberg
- 1983 (56th) Dr. John G. Frayne
- 1984 (57th) Linwood G. Dunn
- 1987 (60th) Fred Hynes
- 1988 (61st) Gordon Henry Cook
- 1989 (62nd) Pierre Angénieux
- 1990 (63rd) Stefan Kudelski
- 1991 (64th) Ray Harryhausen
- 1992 (65th) Erich Kästner
- 1993 (66th) Petro Vlahos
- 1995 (68th) Donald C. Rogers
- 1997 (70th) Don Iwerks
- 1999 (72nd) Dr. Roderick T. Ryan
- 2000 (73rd) Irwin Young
- 2001 (74th) Edmund DiGiulio
- 2003 (76th) Peter D. Parks
- 2004 (77th) Takuo Miyagishima
- 2005 (78th) Gary Demos
- 2006 (79th) Ray Feeney
- 2007 (80th) David Grafton
- 2008 (81st) Edwin Catmull
- 2011 (84th) Douglas Trumbull
- 2013 (86th) Peter W. Anderson
- 2014 (87th) David W. Gray
- 2017 (90th) Jonathan Erland
- 2022 (95th) Iain Neil
