= Ciné-Kodak Special =

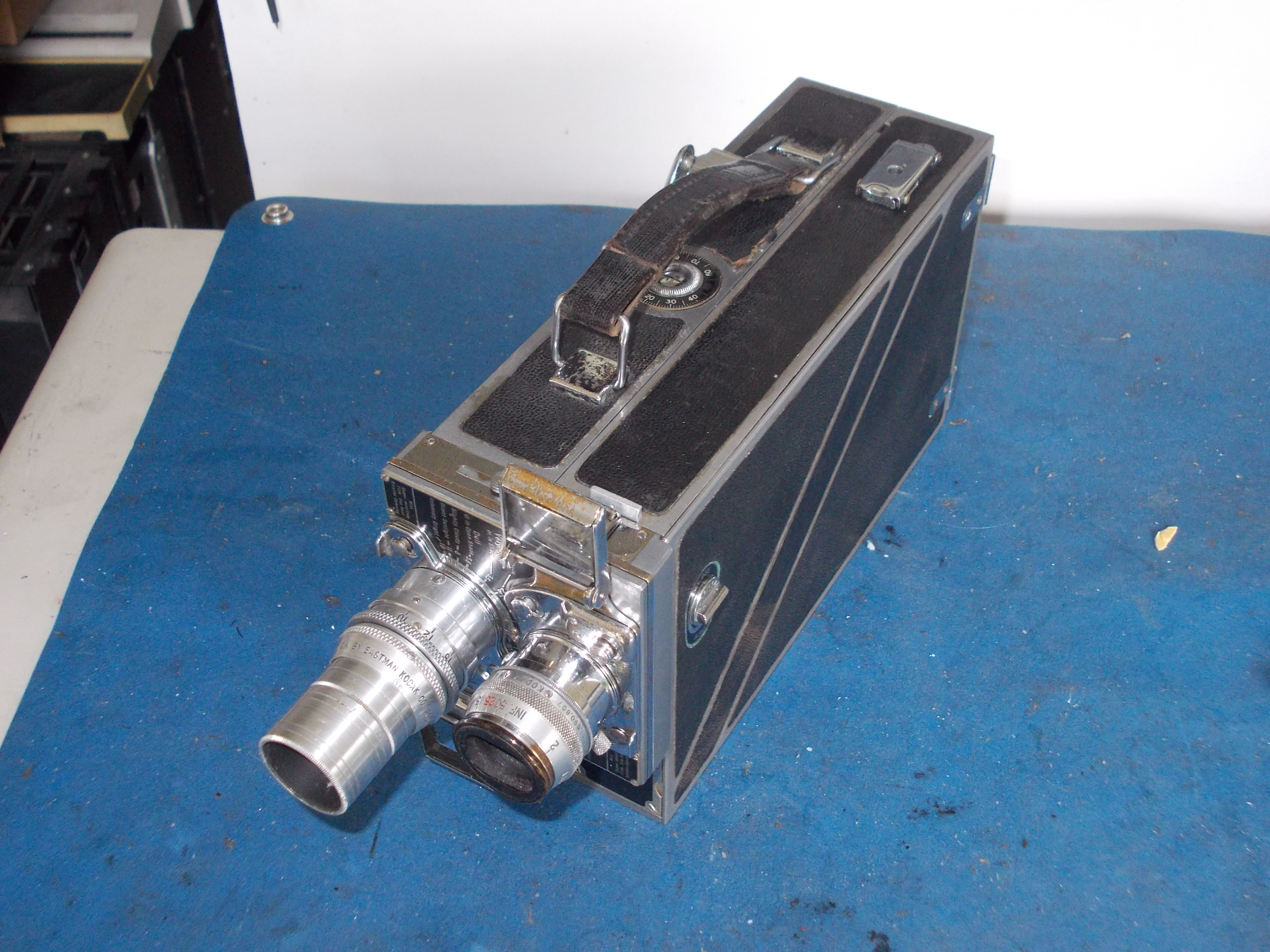
Ciné-Kodak Special with two lenses and 100-foot film magazine

The Ciné-Kodak Special (CKS) family of precision, versatile, spring-wound 16 mm silent movie cameras were produced by Eastman Kodak from the 1930s to the 1960s; while the regular Ciné-Kodak 16 mm movie cameras were marketed to amateurs, the Ciné-Kodak Specials were intended for advanced consumers and industry professionals.

== Overview ==
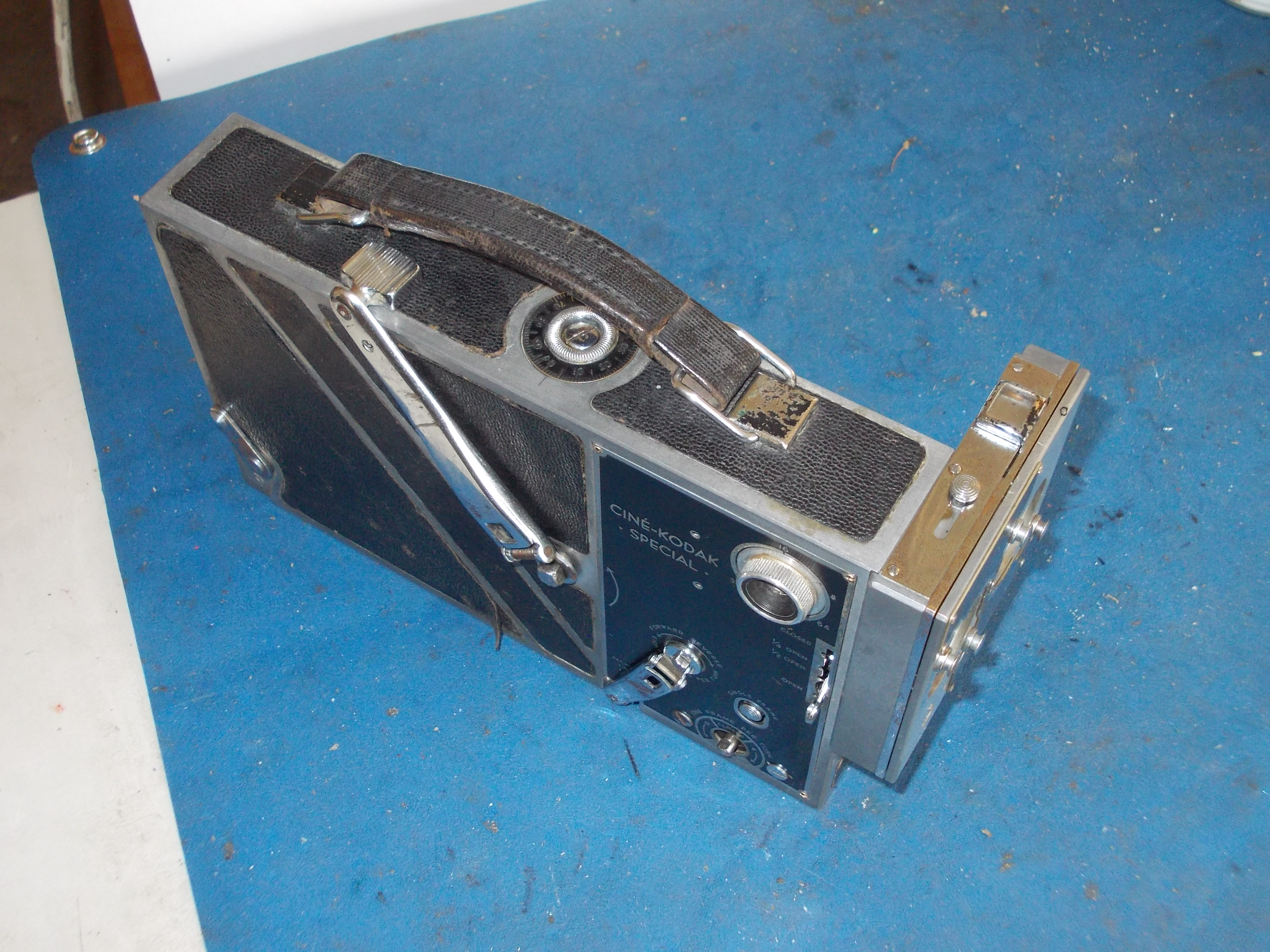
Ciné-Kodak Special, film transport section only

Earlier Kodak 16 mm movie cameras, including the Ciné-Kodak Models B, F and K, shared a common design, being rectangular boxes with a top-mounted handle and a lens extending from the smallest side, similar in shape to a briefcase but smaller. The standard CKS camera had the same boxy rectangular design, but for the Special, this was formed from two joined modules: a spring motor unit and a film magazine. The spring motor half contains the film transport mechanisms and the user controls, including winding cranks, and gear work to the shutter. Two film magazine halves were available, holding either 100 or 200 feet (30 or 61 m) of film; either can be docked to the motor/control half. This allows the cinematographer to pre-load multiple magazines of film for quick interchange of film.

Standard features included:

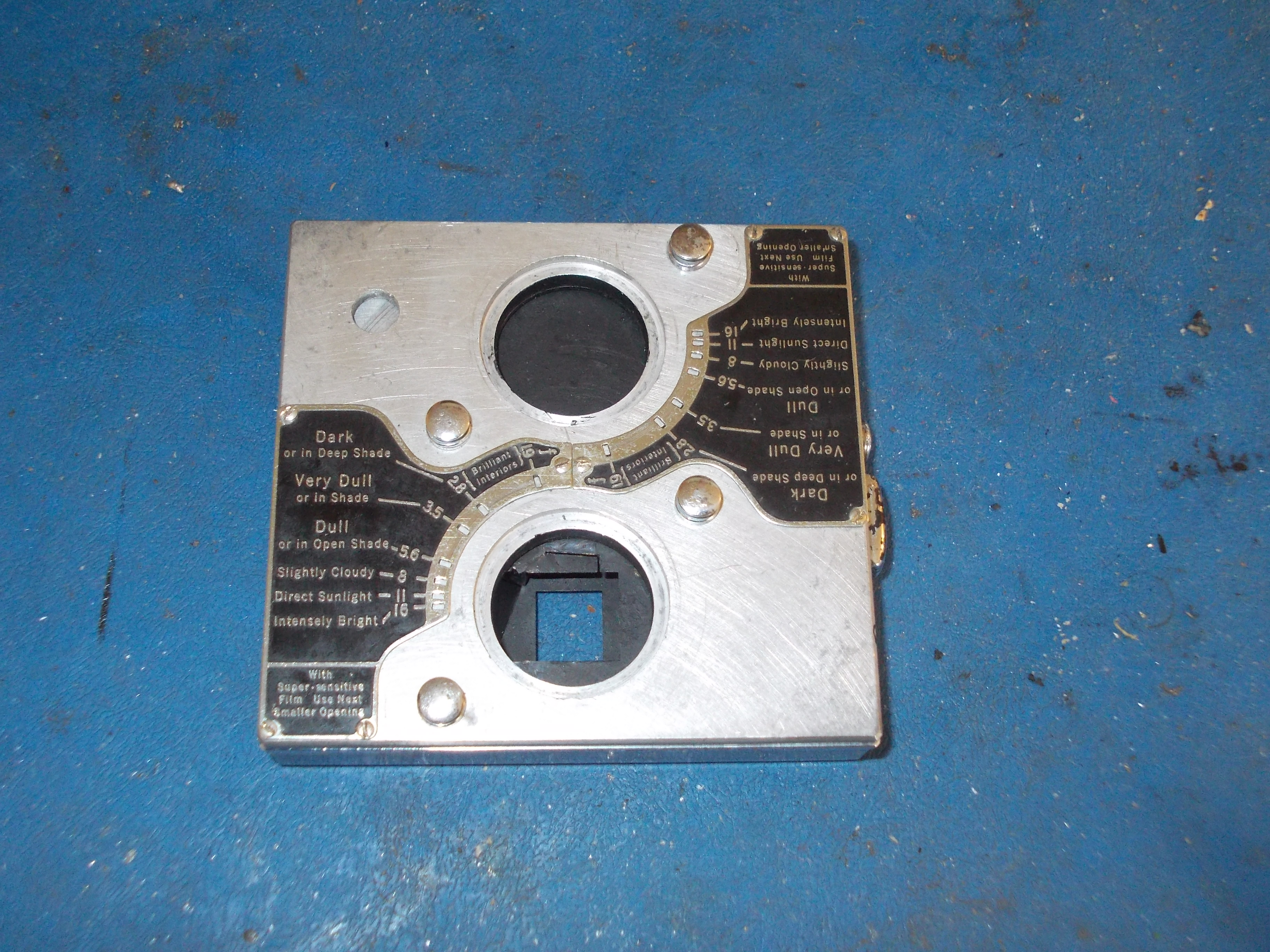
CKS lens turret, removed from camera body

- Interchangeable lenses
- Variable shutter creating fades and dissolves effects
- Reflex focusing
- Quick-change film magazines
- 100’ film magazines
- Chime warning when the spring is almost unwound
- Slots in front of the lens in which to insert masks of various shapes
- Manual cranking shafts: 1 frame per turn and 8 frames per turn.
- Two-lens turret

Optional features included:

- Owner’s name engraved on bottom of lens turret
- 200' film magazines
- Motor Drive
- Tripod

=== Models ===
The first model of the Ciné-Kodak Special appeared in the early 1930s with a two-lens turret. The flat (planar) shape of the turret limited the types of lenses that could be mounted - long lenses could physically or optically interfere with the taking lens.

The post-war Ciné-Kodak Special II (CKS-II), introduced in 1948, uses a beveled turret face so the lens mounts were not parallel, which allows all types of lenses to be fitted simultaneously.

Kodak also made a military version with black, non-reflective metal instead of chrome.

=== Lenses ===
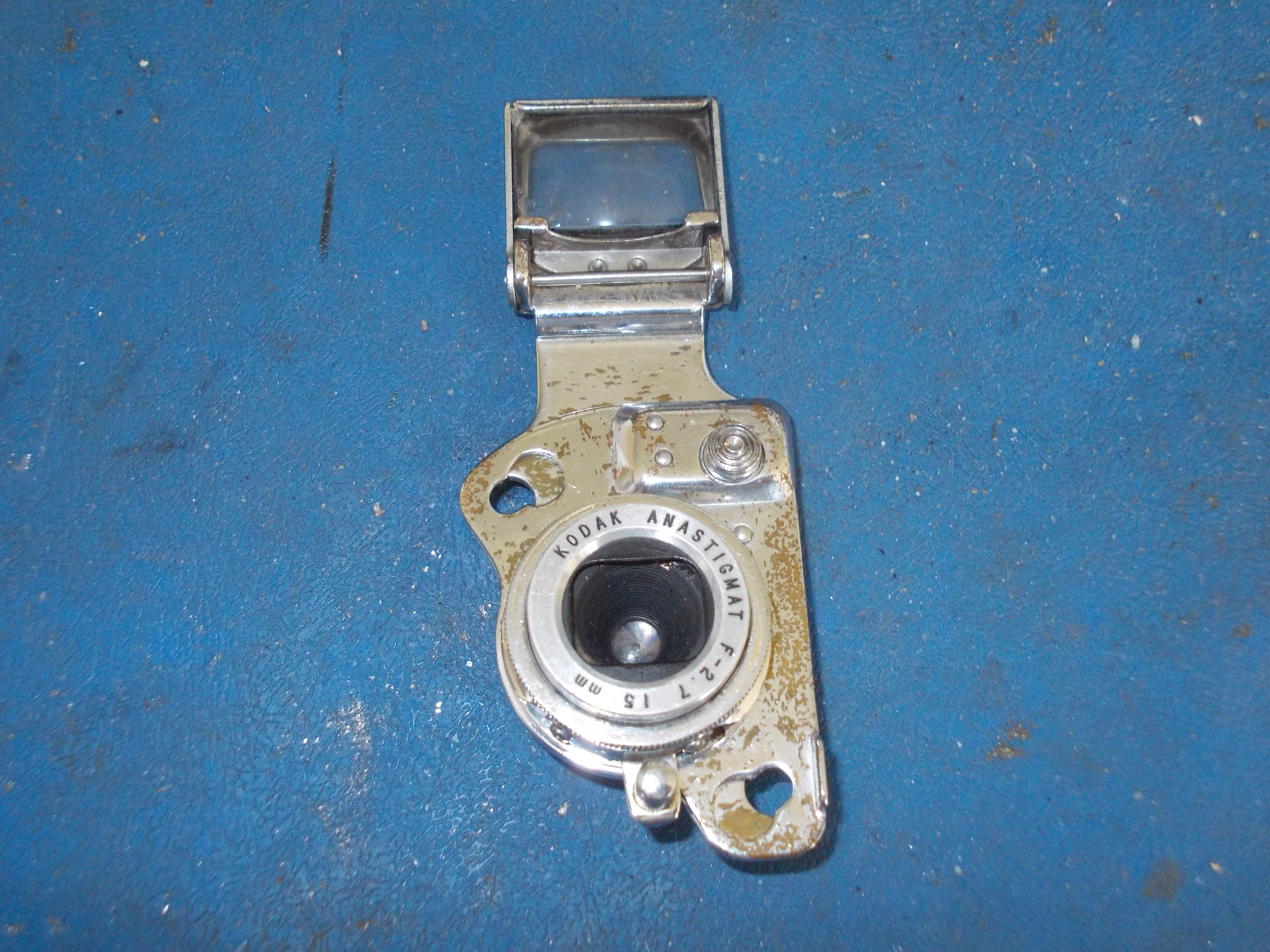
15 mm f/2.7 Anastigmat wide angle lens for Ciné-Kodak Special, with flip-up accessory viewfinder

The CKS turret has two identical lens mounts; the lens in use is in front of the film magazine, while the standby lens is in front of the motor/control module. The original Ciné-Kodak Special (I) uses a different lens mount than the Ciné-Kodak Special II, although Kodak S-mount lenses for the CKS II can be adapted to the CKS (I) with the appropriate adapter.

For the Ciné-Kodak Special (I), the lens mount interface has two protruding studs which mate with corresponding keyholes at approximately 11 o'clock and 5 o'clock on the two-part lens mounting bracket; once the lens is fitted to the body, the top lens mounting bracket plate is turned to secure the lens to the body. As noted, some lenses cannot be mounted simultaneously because of mechanical or optical interference:

CKS I lens turret combination compatibility
Standby lens Taking lens	15	25	50	63	76	102	114	152
15	—N/a	Yes	Maybe (Note: All filters interfere optically)	No (Note: Lens mounts interfere optically)	Maybe	No	No	No
25	Yes	—N/a	Yes	Maybe	Yes	No	Maybe	No
50	Yes	Yes	—N/a	Yes	Yes	Maybe (Note: Lens mounts interfere physically when taking lens is racked out for close-ups)	Yes	Maybe
63	Yes	Yes	Yes	—N/a	Yes	No (Note: Lens mounts interfere physically)	No	No
76	Yes	Yes	Yes	Yes	—N/a	Yes	Yes	Yes
102	Yes	Yes	Yes	No	Yes	—N/a	No	No
114	Yes	Yes	Yes	No	Yes	No	—N/a	No
152	Yes	Yes	Yes	No	Yes	No	No	—N/a

Notes

The CKS II uses the S-mount natively. The adaptors to fit S-mount lenses on the CKS I have tilt-up lenses for the front half of the viewfinder with selectable masks according to the focal length.

=== Filters ===
The lenses for the CKS accept the Kodak TriColor Filter, which allows the camera to capture color footage using an invention from the 1920s: in the Kodacolor process, special panchromatic film is used which has a lenticular layer behind the emulsion. The TriColor filter separates and distributes the colors in a method analogous to pixels today. KodaScope Model B 16mm projectors reconstructed the original color distribution by projecting through an analogous tricolor filter placed over the projection lens.

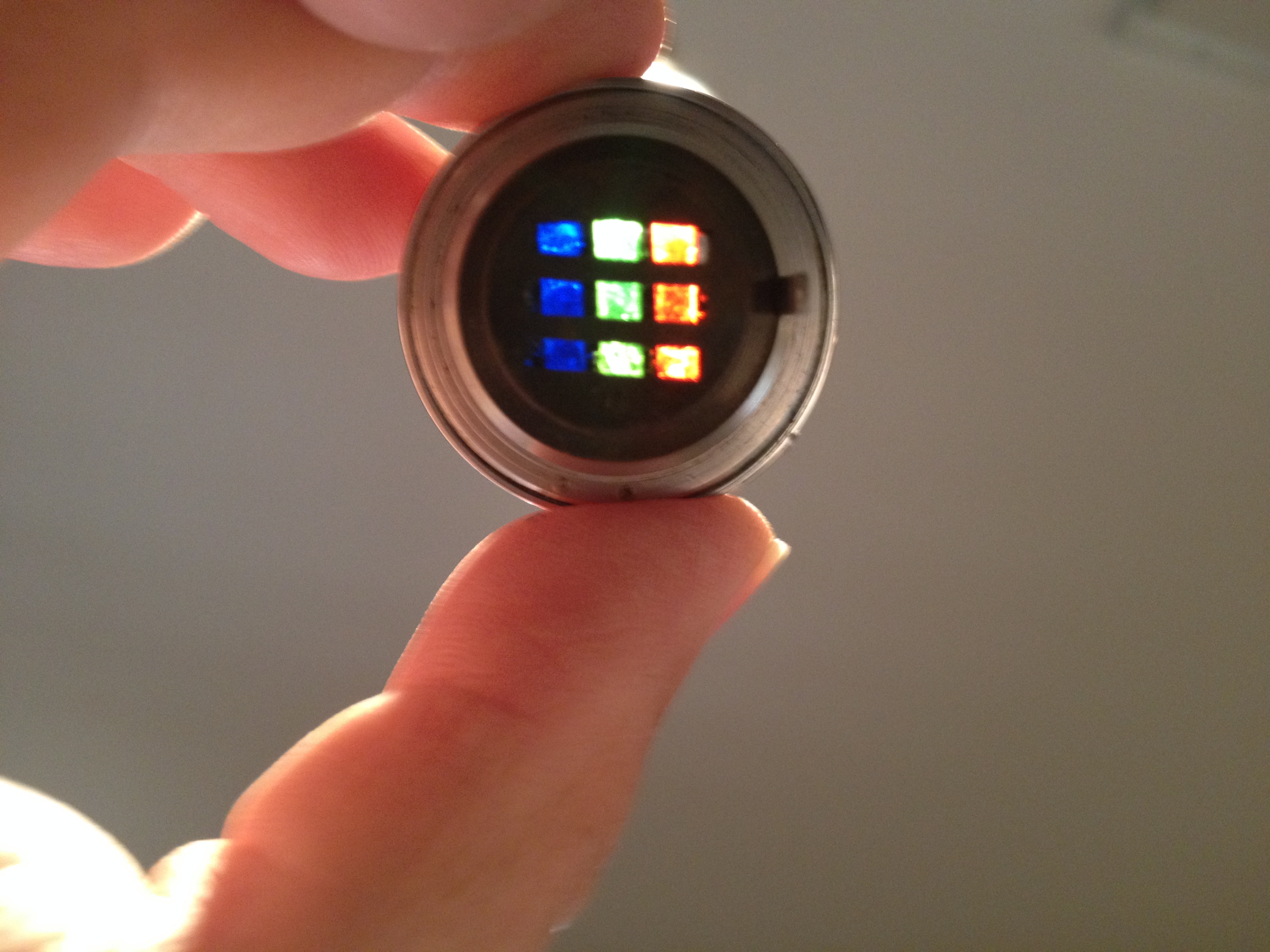
Kodacolor TriColor Filter c. 1928

=== Accessories (Aftermarket) ===
Due to strong acceptance of the CKS in professional use, a robust creative aftermarket to extend and add features grew. Available products included:

- Kodacolor filter for lenses
- Matte box
- Device to automatically open and close the shutter (for fades) linked to the main spring shaft.
- Multiple sources of Motor drives that coupled to the 1-frame per turn shaft
- A Kodak variable speed motor drive
- CECO variable speed motor drive
- CECO 24 fps synchronous motor drive
- CECO blimp for camera and motor drive
- Auricon synchronous motor drive for 24fps
- Auricon sound blimp
- Electronic shutter release control (~ 1940)
- Electronic intervalometer for time lapse photography (~ 1940)
- Animation controller and motor from J-K Camera Engineering
- Magnasync NOMAD magnetic film recorder for double-system sound coupled to the drive CKS drive shaft (~ 1960’s)

== Patents ==
This table identifies the patents covering CKS technologies, providing good date references.

Patent	Date Filed	Inventor	Title
1,688,370	1/11/1928	O. Wittel	Lens Attachment for Photographic Apparatus (The Tri-Color Filter)
1,942,891	6/9/1932	O. Wittel	Motion Picture Film Magazine
1,976,304	6/30/1932	J. Stoiber	Centrifugal Governor for a Motion Picture Camera
1,984,103	7/29/1932	O. Wittel	Reflex Finder for Motion Picture Camera
1,997,321	7/13/1932	J. Stoiber	Brake for Motion Picture Apparatus
2,011,350	7/30/1932	O. Wittel	Control Arrangement for a Motion Picture Camera (Shutter interlock switch for the film magazine)
2,083,646	7/30/1934	A.B. Fuller	Motor Drive for Motion Picture Cameras
2,105,250	8/11/1936	D. F. Lyman, J. Stoiber	Warning Signal for Dissolving Shutters
2,487,913	4/3/1948 (CKS-II)	O. Wittel	Lens Supporting and Focusing Mechanism for Motion-Picture Cameras (offset mount for lenses)
D 133,626	5/1/1942	W. Bach (Auricon)	Motion Picture Camera Motor Drive Casing

The following table identifies lens and filter patents of the CKS Series.

Patent	Date Filed	Inventor	Title
1,620,337	1/17/1923	F.E. Altman	Objective
1,685,600	7/20/1927	W. Frederick	Optical System for Color Processes (Tri-Color Filter)
1,688,370	1/11/1928	O. Wittel	Lens Attachment for Photographic Apparatus (Tri-Color Filter)
1,405,463	5/3/1920	Tessier	Focusing Lens Mount (S-Mount)
2,019,735	6/24/1934	J.W. Scott	Focusing Objective

== Successor cameras ==
Following the CKS, Kodak introduced the synchronous, electric drive 16mm Kodak Reflex Special with a 400' magazine in the early 1960s. The Kodak Reflex Special used a new "Type R" lens mount.

A competitor, Bach-Auricon, sold electrically-driven 16mm sound cameras starting in the early 1940s, which were produced through the 1970s.
