= Kodak S-mount =

Ciné lens mount

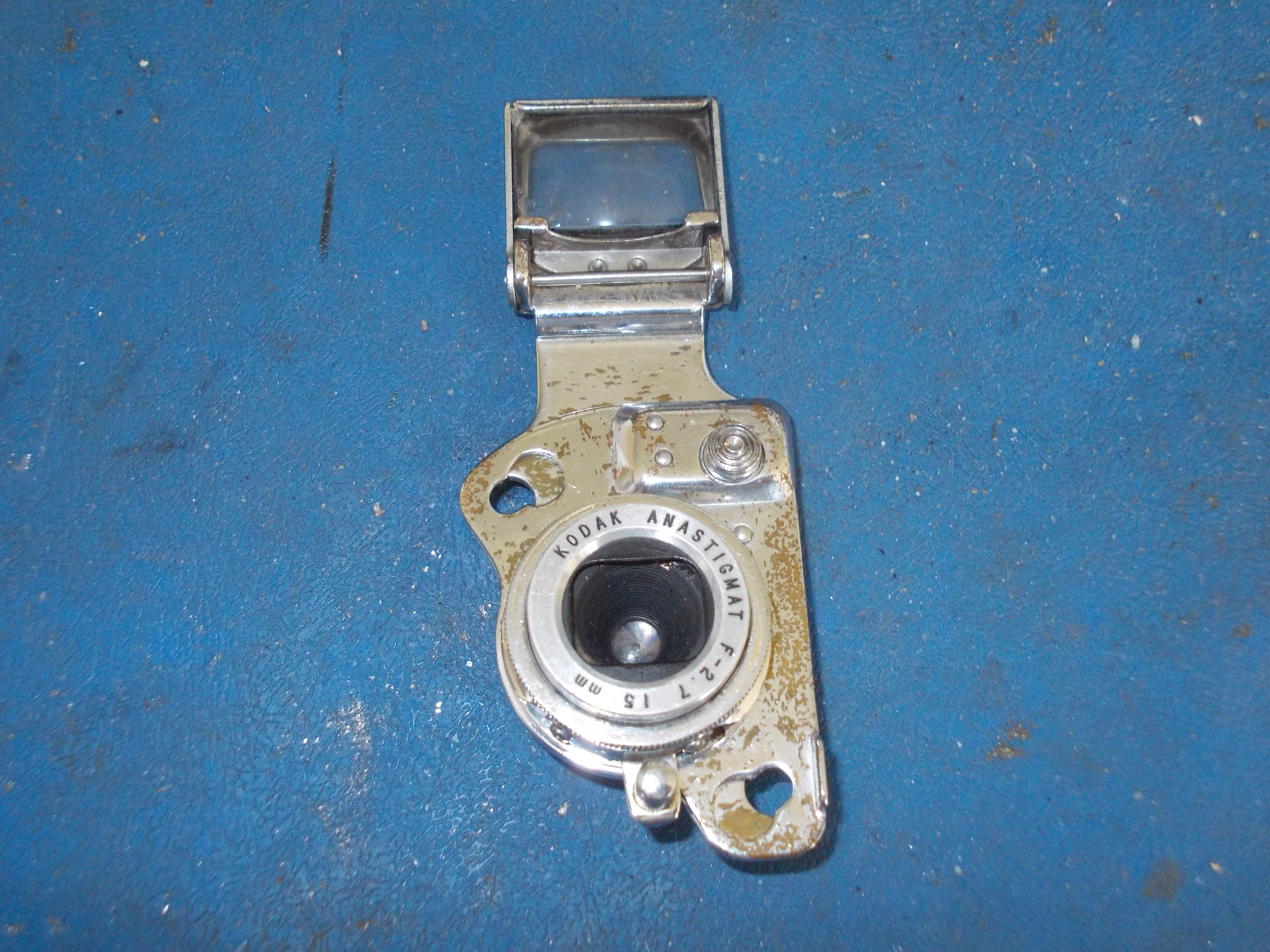
15 mm f/2.7 Kodak Anastigmat wide angle lens, in native "P-mount" for Ciné-Kodak Special cameras, with a flip-up lens for that camera's built-in reflex viewfinder.

The S-mount ciné lens mount was originally developed by Kodak and introduced in 1933 for the Ciné-Kodak line of movie cameras. The only camera body sold by Kodak with a native S-mount was the Ciné-Kodak Special II.

== Characteristics and applications ==
According to historian Doug Kerr, the S-mount was developed and released in 1933 to simplify the profusion of lens mounts for the line of Ciné-Kodak 16 and 8 mm movie cameras; at the time, many of the lens mounts were unique to the particular camera model, and the line of Kodak ciné lenses for 16 mm cameras spanned a range of focal lengths from 15 to 152 mm. It was not efficient to maintain an adequate stock of optically identical lenses with multiple mounts. The S-mount uses a mixture of bayonet and threaded attachments; a locating pin on the lens fits into a matching slot on the camera body or adapter to ensure proper rotational orientation, and then a captive, threaded collar on the camera or adapter is rotated to engage corresponding threads on the lens, securing it.

Kodak adaptors for S-mount Ciné-Kodak lenses
Lens focal length(s) Camera		15	25, 40, 50, 63	50, 63, 102	152
Ciné-Kodak	Model K	H	R (Note: For the 25 mm f/1.4 Cine-Ektar lens, the camera required factory modification)	J	
Ciné-Kodak	Model E (f/1.9)	A			—
Magazine Ciné-Kodak Magazine Ciné-Kodak Eight, Model 90		M			
Ciné-Kodak Special		G	P	F	
Ciné-Kodak Special II		— (native)			
C mount (incl. Cine-Kodak K-100)		C			
D mount (incl. Ciné-Kodak Reliant, Medallion)		D			

Although the S-mount was introduced in 1933, it was not fitted natively to a camera until the Ciné-Kodak Special II, which was manufactured from 1948 to 1961. S-mount lenses can be fitted to other ciné cameras using the appropriate adapter; for example, the 25 mm S-mount lens can be mounted on a Ciné-Kodak Special using a Type P adapter. For the Ciné-Kodak Special and Ciné-Kodak Model K, since the front part of the viewfinder is built into the lens mount, there are multiple adapters which have identical mechanical interfaces, but carry different sets of viewfinder optics and mask(s). Other cameras, including the Ciné-Kodak Special II, made the front viewfinder optics a separate accessory bundled with the lens.

=== List of lenses ===
Lenses released by Kodak for Ciné-Kodak cameras include:

Kodak lenses for Ciné-Kodak 16 mm and 8 mm cameras
F.L. (mm)	Name	Aperture	Constr.	Min. focus	Angle of view (Note: For 16 mm cameras unless otherwise stated)	8 mm (Note: Designates whether this lens can be used with 8 mm film cameras)	16 mm (Note: Designates whether this lens can be used with 16 mm film cameras)	S-mount (Note: Indicates if at least one variant of this lens was produced with a native S-mount)	Filter	Notes
9	Ektanon	f/2.7	?	4 ft (1.2 m)	25.9° × 19.6° (Note: With 8 mm cameras)	Yes	No	Yes	Ser.V	
13	Ektanon	f/1.9	?	24 in (0.61 m)	19.4° × 14.6°	Yes	No	No	Ser.VI	Kit lens with many Ciné-Kodak Eights
13	Anastigmat	f/1.9	4e/4g	24 in (0.61 m)	19.4° × 14.6°	Yes	No	No	Ser.V	Earlier lens
13	Anastigmat	f/2.7	3e/3g	fixed	18.7° × 14.1°	Yes	No	No	?	
13	Anastigmat	f/3.5	3e/3g	fixed	19.7° × 14.9°	Yes	No	No	?	
15	Ektar	f/2.5	?	6 in (0.15 m)	34.0° × 25.7°	No	Yes	Yes	Ser.VI	
15	Ektanon	f/2.7	?	6 in (0.15 m)	34.0° × 25.7°	No	Yes	Yes	Ser.VI	
15	Anastigmat	f/2.7	3e/3g	6 in (0.15 m)	34.0° × 25.7°	No	Yes	No	Ser.VI	Earlier lens; some marked as 3/4-in. Fixed-focus version takes Series V filters.
25	Ektar	f/1.4	7e/4g (Double Gauss)	12 in (0.30 m)	21.5° × 16.2° (Note: 9.9° × 7.4° with 8 mm cameras)	Yes	Yes	Yes	Ser.VI	
25	Ektar	f/1.9	?	12 in (0.30 m)	21.5° × 16.2°	Yes	Yes	Yes	Ser.VI	Later lens
25	Anastigmat	f/1.9	4e/4g	2 ft (0.6 m)	21.5° × 16.2°	No	Yes	No	Ser.V	Earlier lens; some marked as 1-in.
38	Ektanon	f/2.5	?	12 in (0.30 m)	6.6° × 5.0°	Yes	No	Yes	?	
38	Anastigmat	f/2.5	4e/2g	24 in (0.61 m)	6.6° × 5.0°	Yes	No	No	?	Earlier lens; some marked as 1 1/2-in.
38	Ektanon	f/2.8	?	24 in (0.61 m)	6.5° × 4.8°	Yes	No	No	?	D-mount lens
40	Ektar	f/1.6	?	2 ft (0.6 m)	13.7° × 10.3°	Yes	Yes	Yes	Ser.VI	
50	Ektanon	f/1.6	?	2 ft (0.6 m)	10.8° × 8.1° (Note: 4.9° × 3.7° with 8 mm cameras)	Yes	Yes	Yes	Ser.VI	
50	Anastigmat	f/1.6	4e/2g	2 ft (0.6 m)	10.8° × 8.1°	Yes	Yes	No	Ser.VI	Earlier lens
50	Anastigmat	f/3.5	3e/3g (Cooke triplet)	2 1/4 ft (0.7 m)	10.9° × 8.1° (Note: 5.0° × 3.7° with 8 mm cameras)	Yes	Yes	No	Ser.V	Earlier lens; some marked as 2-in.
63	Ektar	f/2.0	?	2 ft (0.6 m)	8.7° × 6.5° (Note: 4.0° × 3.0° with 8 mm cameras)	Yes	Yes	Yes	Ser.VI	
63	Ektanon	f/2.7	?	1 ft (0.3 m)	8.7° × 6.5°	Yes	Yes	Yes	Ser.VI	
63	Anastigmat	f/2.7	4e/2g	1 1/2 ft (0.5 m)	8.7° × 6.5°	Yes	Yes	No	Ser.VI	Earlier lens, some marked as 2 1/2-in.
76	Telephoto Anastigmat	f/4.5	4e/2g	3 3/4 ft (1.1 m)	7.2° × 5.4° (Note: 3.3° × 2.5° with 8 mm cameras)	Yes	Yes	No	Ser.V	Earlier lens, some marked as 3-in.
78	Telephoto Anastigmat	f/4.5	?	3 3/4 ft (1.1 m)	7.2° × 5.4°	No	Yes	No	Ser.VI	Model B only
102	Ektar	f/2.7	4e/2g	3 ft (0.9 m)	5.4° × 4.1°	No	Yes	Yes	Ser.VI	
102	Ektanon	f/2.7	4e/2g	2 ft (0.6 m)	5.4° × 4.1°	No	Yes	Yes	?	
102	Anastigmat	f/2.7	4e/2g	4 1/2 ft (1.4 m)	5.4° × 4.1°	No	Yes	No	Ser.VII	Earlier lens, some marked as 4-in.
114	Telephoto Anastigmat	f/4.5	4e/2g	4 1/4 ft (1.3 m)	4.8° × 3.6°	No	Yes	No	Ser.VI	Earlier lens, some marked as 4 1/2-in.
152	Ektar	f/4.0	?	6 ft (1.8 m)	3.6° × 2.7°	No	Yes	Yes	Ser.VI	
152	Ektanon	f/4.5	?	55 in (1.4 m)	3.6° × 2.7°	No	Yes	Yes	?	
152	Telephoto Anastigmat	f/4.5	4e/2g	10 ft (3.0 m)	3.6° × 2.7°	No	Yes	No	Ser.VI	Earlier lens, some marked as 6-in.
