= John G. Frayne =

Physicist and sound engineer

- Born: July 4, 1894; Ireland
- Died: October 4, 1990 (aged 96); Pasadena, California, U.S.
- Education: University of Minnesota College of Science and Engineering
- Occupations: Physicist; sound engineer

John G. Frayne (July 8, 1894, in Ireland – October 31, 1990, in Pasadena, California) was a physicist and sound engineer.

== Career ==
Frayne received his Ph.D. in physics from the University of Minnesota while working at the Bell Laboratories.

In 1918 he helped develop wireless telephone communications between airplanes and the ground while a member of the US Army Signal Corps.

In 1928, he went to California Institute of Technology as a National Research Fellow in Physics. In 1929 he moved from Bell Laboratories to Electrical Research Products, where he worked for 30 years developing the light valve, noise reduction, 70m magnetic film recording and reproduction systems.

In 1949, with Halley Wolfe, he wrote the classic textbook Elements of Sound Recording.

Among his technical achievements were the development of sound recording techniques and their reproduction for optical sound recording systems, which led to stereo-optical formats used by films in the 1970s and '80s. He was a co-inventor of the sphere densitometer, which won a Scientific or Technical Academy Award in 1941. He was also the co-inventor of the stereo disc cutter which was standard in the recording industry, and the co-inventor of the intermodulation techniques of distortion measurements, which won him an Academy Award in 1953.

== Awards ==
Dr. Frayne, a Fellow of the Audio Engineering Society (AES), received its Gold Medal Award for Outstanding Achievement in advancing the art of audio engineering in 1976. He received the SMPTE Progress Medal in 1947.

He was awarded the third Gordon E. Sawyer Award (Oscar statuette) by the Academy of Motion Picture Arts and Sciences in 1983.
