= CP-16 =

16mm motion picture cameras

The CP-16, CP-16A, CP-16R, CP-16R/A and CP-16R/DS cameras are 16mm motion picture cameras manufactured by the Cinema Products Corporation of Hollywood, California. A range of cameras of Auricon ancestry, they were primarily intended for television news filming and were quite popular with local and national news agencies before the advent of portable videotape Electronic News Gathering, (ENG) formats, as well as documentary and drama production.

They featured a compact magnesium alloy body, a crystal locked drive system, interchangeable lenses, and a magnetic audio system with a built in mixer that recorded onto special pre-striped (and now discontinued) 16mm single-perf negative or reversal film. It accepted both Mitchell and Cinema Products 400 foot film magazines.

The CP-16 series used a special 12-120mm Angenieux zoom lens with a prismatic viewfinder. The CP-16 used a variety of Angenieux lenses, a favorite among television news photographers was the 9.5 - 57mm zoom with a F1.6-2.2 aperture making it a very versatile camera; an operator could quite literally shoot an interview in a closet. The CP-16R series used a spinning mirror shutter.

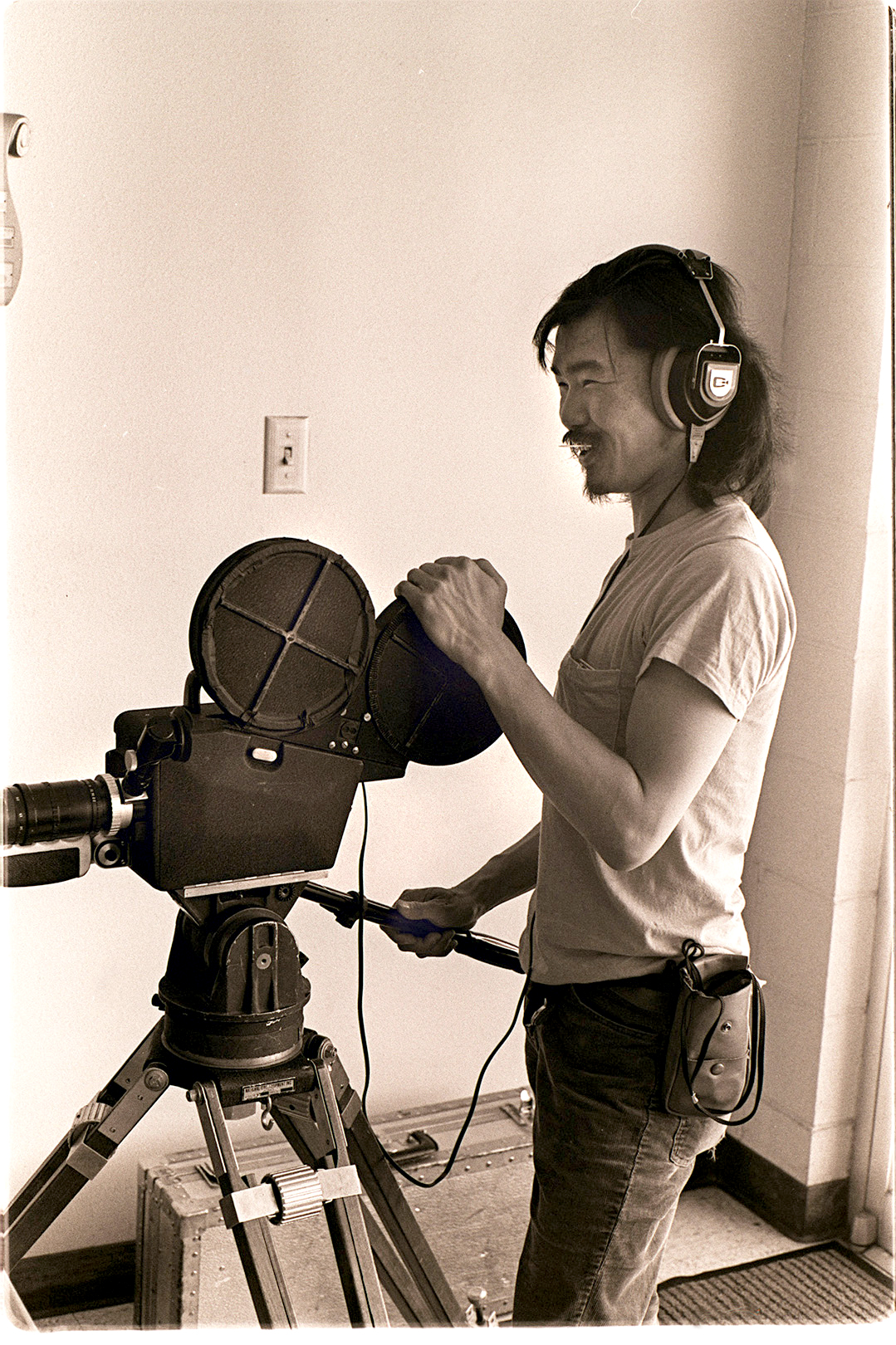
Documentary director Curtis Choy films with a CP-16.

CP-16: non-reflex 180° shutter,'C' lens mount, SEPMAG or COMMAG. CP-16/A: as above but with integral automatic COMMAG amplifier. CP-16R: 156° shutter reflex, CP (miniature BNCR) lens mount, SEPMAG or COMMAG with amplifier separate from camera. Later type has 170° focal plane shutter plus mirror reflex. CP-16R/A: as CP-16R but with integral COMMAG amplifier. CP-16R/ADS: as CP-16R but for SEPMAG (double system) sound only.

CP 16s are still often used in small productions and in film schools. Many of these cameras were donated or sold off when news crews adopted videotape.
