= Auricon =

Auricon cameras were 16 mm film single-system sound-on-film motion picture cameras manufactured in the 1940s through the early 1980s. Auricon cameras are notable because they record sound directly onto an optical or magnetic track on the same film that the image is photographed on, thus eliminating the need for a separate audio recorder. The camera preceded ENG video cameras as the main AV tool of television news gathering due to its portability–and relatively quick production turn-around–where processed negative film image could be broadcast by electronically creating a positive image. Additionally, the Auricon found studio use as a 'kinescope' camera of live video off of a TV screen, but only on early pre-NTSC line-locked monochrome systems.

Auricon cameras were used primarily by news and documentary filmmakers. They had also found favor with independent and experimental filmmakers such as Paul Morrissey because of their ability to record long takes with sound on film. Eventually, they were replaced by lighter, self blimped battery powered reflex cameras such as the CP-16, which also had the ability to record sound on film.

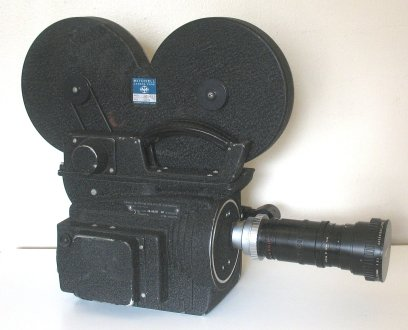
Modified Auricon Cinevoice CM-72A with 12–120mm Angenieux Zoom Lens and 400 foot Mitchell magazine; this appears to be a Camera Equipment Company (CECo) conversion

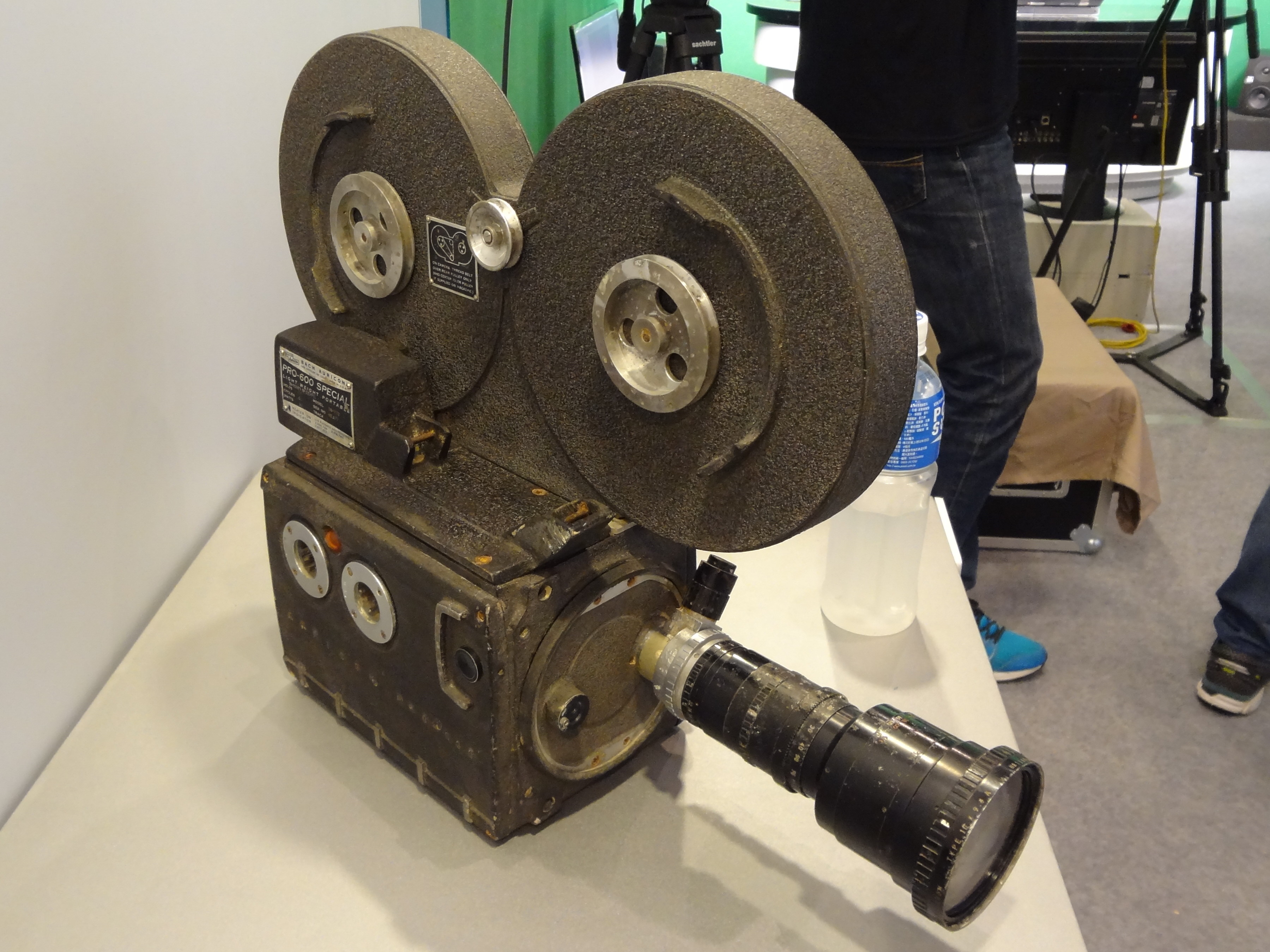
Auricon PRO-600 Special with 12–120mm Angenieux Zoom Lens and 400 foot magazine

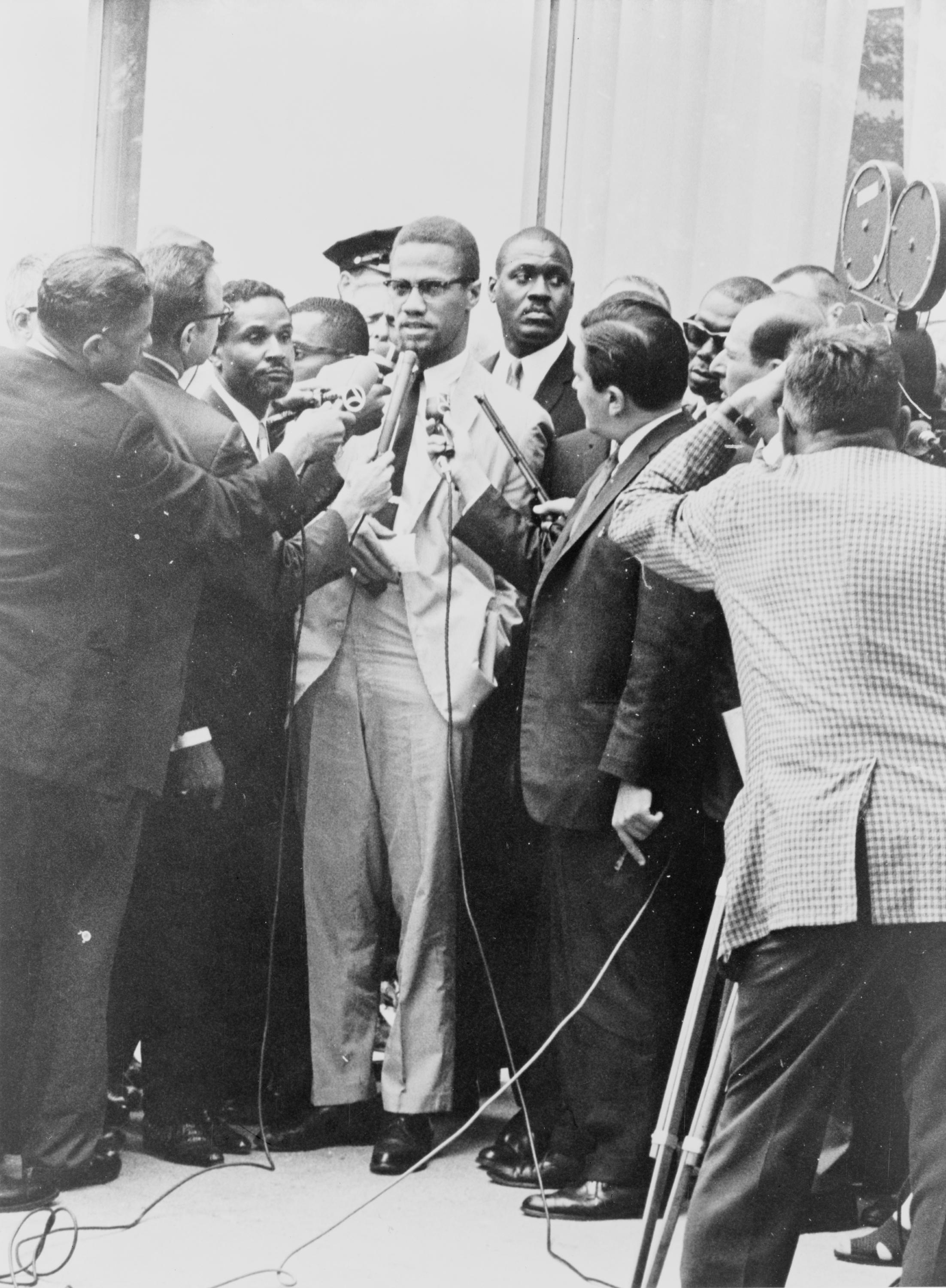
WNBC's Gabe Pressman interviews Malcolm X, with CineVoice 'Chop Top'

== History ==
=== Three engineers – Bach, Berndt and Maurer ===
The History of Auricon begins in New York City. Some of this history is inferred from the collection of patents filed by the trio in the 1930s. John Maurer worked at RCA Labs in New Jersey on sound recording technology in the early 1930s. Eric Berndt was a camera designer in NYC whose business card read: “Specialist in the Design and Building of Special Motion Picture Equipment” and “Formerly with RCA Photophone Research Dept.”

The first 16mm sound-on-film camera was built by Eric Berndt around 1932.

In 1934 Maurer left RCA and joined Eric Berndt to form the Berndt-Maurer Corporation. By 1939, Berndt and Walter Bach moved from NYC to Los Angeles to join up with Maurer.

The December 1939 American Cinematographer has an ad for a Berndt-Maurer synchronous motor drive for the Kodak Cine Special. Later, a blimp was offered, and which mounted the Cine Special camera, the synchronous motor (and a follow-focus mechanism for use with the later Cine Special II). The blimp accommodated 100 or 200 foot film magazines.

A 1939 Berndt-Maurer catalog shows the B-M Sound-Pro camera: 16mm, single or double system, four-lens turret and ground glass focusing. Their target market was industrial films and employee training films.

In 1940 Berndt left the partnership, which then became J.A. Maurer Inc. The first camera labeled as an E. M. Berndt Auricon was the 1941 S16MM SB-CT, a wooden-box single-system sound camera.

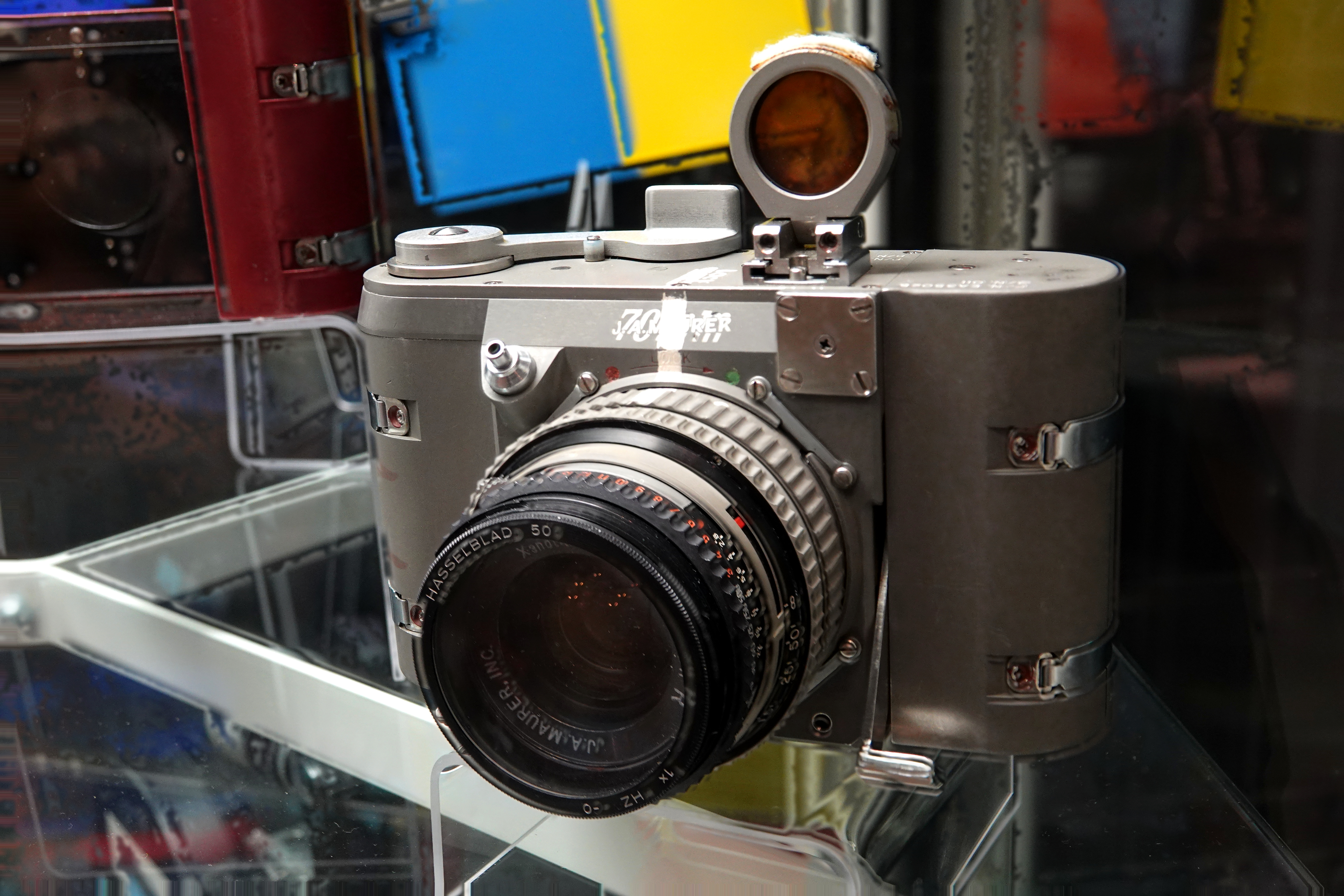
Maurer 70mm Gemini Camera at Steven F. Udvar-Hazy Center Virginia USA.

In later years, John Maurer designed cameras for NASA, including a 70mm camera used in the space Gemini XI mission in 1966, and in the first Moon landing.

=== Camera Development ===
Auricon's CineVoice cameras were amenable to modification because of their attractive movement, sharp images, offered at a low price in a noiseless, reasonably portable camera body. Auricon was not responsive to the requirements of camera operators, refusing to redesign their cameras to use the industry standard 400' magazine and other magazines. This created a cottage industry of camera modifiers such as Yoder and James Frezzolini (the latter distributed by F&B CECo) which would remove the top of the camera (known colloquially as a "chop top" or "crop top") and modify it to accept removable Mitchell magazines, as well as offering other modifications. Auricon never developed a spinning mirror or pelicle reflex camera. This forced camera operators to rely on either fixed focus lenses with an optical viewfinder (aided on some models by ground glass rack-over focusing that was possible only when the camera was not operating), or using prism-reflex Angenieux zoom lenses that came with their own viewfinder.

Auricon's Pro-600 was aimed at on-location news crews. It accepted magazines that could film 15 minutes continuously, and Kodak offered film specifically for it in this length. In response to all the smaller companies that modified CineVoices, Auricon improved the Pro-600 with the "Pro-600 Special" which was lighter (24 instead of 36 pounds), and took 400 ft. magazines. The "Pro-600 Special" also adopted the CECo-type clutch for driving the magazine take-up. In this respect, Auricon was taking cues from the market in a roundabout way, relying on the cottage modification industry to signal demand for a given feature.

The Auricon Super-1200 was designed for long interviews and TV studio films. It could run 33 minutes worth of 16mm film on one load. It also offered several professional-type options, such as a variable shutter and rackover ground glass focusing (the latter possible only when the camera was not operating). This model was used by Andy Warhol to film Empire, as well as subsequent films including his works with Paul Morrissey which benefited from the long takes the camera made possible.

E.M. Berndt manufactured Auricon 16mm sound-on-film cameras for the US Army during WWII, such as the CT-70.

Some Auricon 16mm cameras were modified by Bach Auricon to accommodate customers purchasing these cameras for television kinescope use. The camera shutter was replaced with a new, patented "TV-T" shutter, a slight change in shutter angle, but which change allowed recording off a TV monitor without also encountering a (vertical) "roll bar". This application was only possible on monochrome 60 Hz line-locked TV systems (precisely 60 fields/second, 30 frames/second, interlaced), and not the later NTSC color/monochrome standard (roughly 59.94 fields/second, 29.97 frames/second, interlaced).

Auricon cameras that could record single system optical sound-on-film tracks contained a Mirror galvanometer, which was a device that recorded sound on the film by means of a beam of light that varied in accordance with the frequency and intensity of the sound being recorded. Several types of galvanometer were offered including variable-density both with and without "noise-reduction" bias, unilaterial variable-area both with and without "noise-reduction" bias, and an extra cost "Modulite" unilateral variable area which featured a separate "noise-reduction" shutter rather than a "noise-reduction" bias. Although all of these optical sound systems were RCA-licensed, none was as good as a true RCA system.

For a brief while, a professional version of the "Modulite" galvanometer was offered for retrofitting other manufacturers' 16mm or 35mm sound recorders, but this version could not be installed on an Auricon camera or recorder.

In the mid-1950s, Auricons were also offered with "Filmagnetic" a Bach Auricon-patented method for recording magnetic sound using a single-system camera and "striped" film, produced by Eastman Kodak. Some Auricons were introduced late enough that all of these came factory-equipped for "Filmagnetic", but older cameras could be factory-converted for "Filmagnetic". The CineVoice II and Pro 600-Special came standard with provision for "Filmagnetic", although the actual "Filmagnetic" system was optional at extra cost; the CineVoice and the early Pro 600 and Super 1200 required factory conversion.

Auricon also manufactured separate, stand-alone, optical sound recorders such as the RT-80 (200 foot capacity) and the RM-30 (1200 foot capacity). These could be used for the double-system method of recording sound for films. Double system allowed for using film specifically designed for sound recording. Double system recording provided better potential sound quality and allowed for much greater control in the film editing process as the sound can then be edited separately from the picture.

Beginning in the mid-1970s, rival camera manufacturer Cinema Products began making lighter-weight 16mm film cameras using Auricon film movements and magnesium bodies, considerably easier to handle than the rugged solid-metal Auricons. After a year or two, Auricon cut off the supply of film movements, forcing Cinema Products to make their own mechanisms, which they could legally do because the Auricon patents were no longer valid. The Cinema Products CP-16 camera quickly became the standard 16mm film documentary camera over the next decade, until videotape began to curtail the use of 16mm film.

Walter Bach closed down the business in the late 70's because the advent of portable video for TV news eliminated his key market. For 50 years the company had assembled 16mm film cameras that were used for filming television news and shows shot on location. Walter Bach never sold his business and never sold all of his equipment, but simply downsized to the minimum.

He continued to go into work throughout the 1980s, with sometimes only 1 package coming in and 1 going out on the same day. He continued to fill orders as possible, especially if he had some of the items readily available in inventory. When he could no longer work the company ceased to operate.

The building at 6950 Romaine St., Hollywood, Calif., was sealed since the early 1990s until the demolition of the "Auricon" building in 2005.

== Camera models ==
=== WW II Period ===
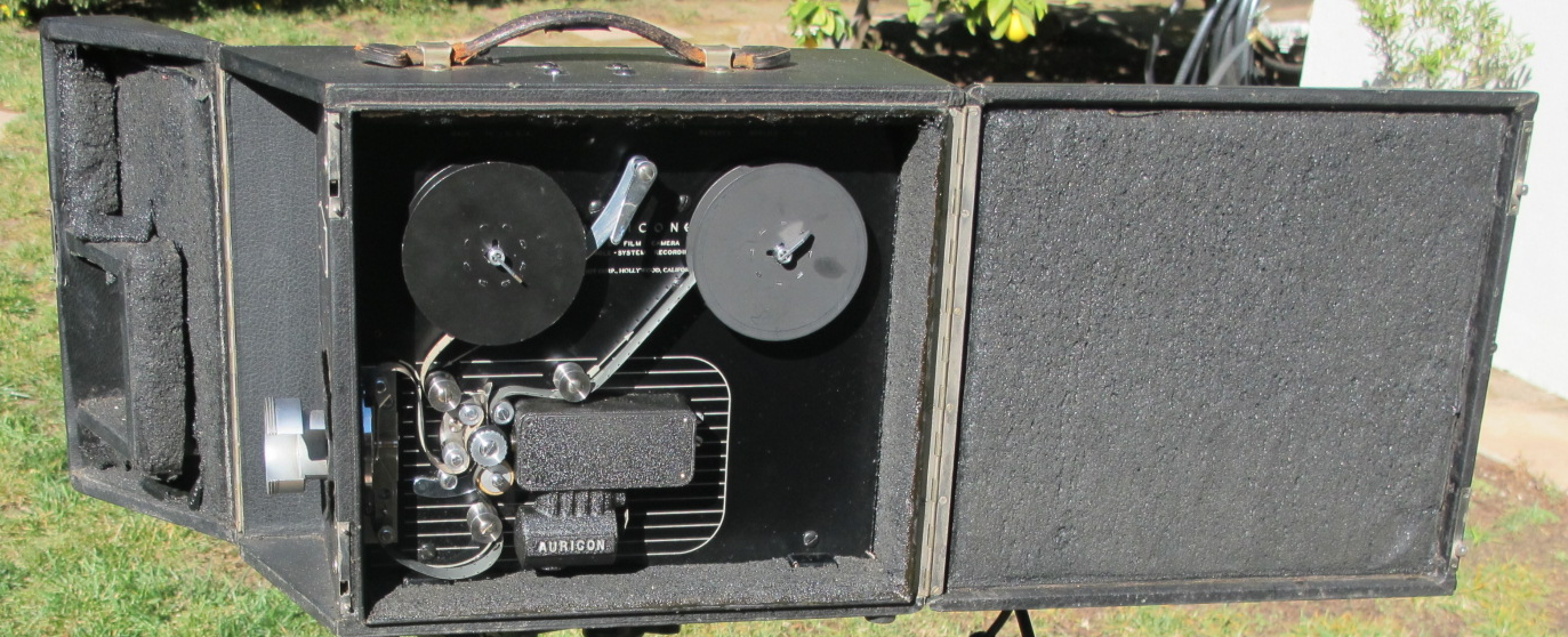
Auricon SSB-CT wooden frame 16mm sound-on-film camera, 1942.

SSB-CT (1942), a wartime 200' capacity single or double-system optical sound camera. Barebones camera. Due to unavailability of metals during the war, CT components were housed in a wooden camera housing, reminiscent of a typewriter case.

CT-70 (1943), another wartime 200' capacity single or double-system camera. A 200' capacity double-system recorder (RT-80) was also offered for double-system recording. All subsequent models were contained within a metal camera housing. Matches with RA-22 Amplifier.

=== Postwar ===
Postwar cameras returned to metal bodies.

CM-71 (1947), a 200' internal capacity model which included a synchronous motor for double-system filming.

CM-72, a 100' internal capacity model which incorporated an induction motor and was suitable only for single-system filming. This model, fitted with an after-market synchronous motor, became early "donors" for numerous after-market "chop top" cameras (CECo, Yoder, et al.) Factory conversion to CM-72A was available (and this conversion also provided the external connectors and internal wiring for Filmagnetic.)

CM-72A, a 100' internal capacity model which incorporated a synchronous motor and was suitable for single- or double-system filming. This model became the "donor" for numerous after-market "chop top" cameras (CECo, Yoder, et al.)

CM-74 (1953), a 1200' external capacity model, dubbed "Super 1200", which incorporated a synchronous motor and was suitable for single- or double-system filming. Several professional features, such as "rackover" and variable shutter were also offered. TV-T (Television Transcription Shutter) offered for kinescope recording for delayed re-transmission. Sapphire inserts in the film gate (all other models had steel ball bearings as inserts.) Electrical torque motor take-up.

CM-75 (1955), a 600' external capacity model, dubbed "Pro 600", which incorporated a synchronous motor and was suitable for single- or double-system filming. Professional features, such as "rackover" and variable shutter were not offered. This model utilized electrical take-up patterned after the Super 1200. Using a Birns & Sawyer Mitchell magazine adapter, this model was occasionally utilized with 1200' Mitchell magazines.

CM-77, a 400' external capacity model, dubbed "Pro 600 Special", which incorporated a synchronous motor and was suitable for single- or double-system filming. Professional features, such as "rackover" and variable shutter were not offered. This model utilized a mechanical take-up system patterned after the earlier CECo and Yoder "chop top" conversions.

CM-80, external magazine model, incorporating a synchronous motor, integrated amplifier (the Bach 800), and reflex mirror finder.

=== Competition, and Post-Auricon ===
Subsequent to the CM-77, several potential models were in development. These included a 400' external capacity non-reflex camera with improved ergonomics over the CM-77 and which retained the 115 volt ac powering requirement, and a 400' external capacity reflex camera which incorporated a dc motor and crystal control, possibly intended to compete with the Cinema Products CP-16R. Neither of these developmental models got beyond the pre-production stage of development. Both of these cameras were magnetic-only, as were the potentially competing Cinema Products CP-16A and CP-16R.

Single-System sound entered the consumer market in 1959 with the Fairchild Cinephonic 8 - using magnetic-striped 8mm film. The real expansion of single-system sound was enabled by Kodak's Super-8 platform with mag striped film in several emulsions in the late 1970s through 1980s.

Then there is the Magnasync Nomad, a mechanically coupled dual-system, circa 1960. It used split-16 reels (2.5" diameter, 100') of magnetic tape, sprocketed for 16mm film. A camera (Bolex, Kodak Cine Special, B&H 70, Pathe Webo; and factory-modified Auricons or Arri's) is docked to the top of the Nomad. A mechanical transmission interlock cable to the single frame-per=turn gear of the camera, and to the Nomad. The spring of the camera thus also turns the mag tape reels of the Nomad. Alternatively, a 24 fps sync electric motor docks to the Nomad, and turns the camera gears. A connected external amplifier and control handset connects to the Nomad. The tape drive had extension arms for larger 400' mag tape reels. It was a marvel of engineering from the ubiquitous vendor of editing suite 16mm and 35mm sync editing.

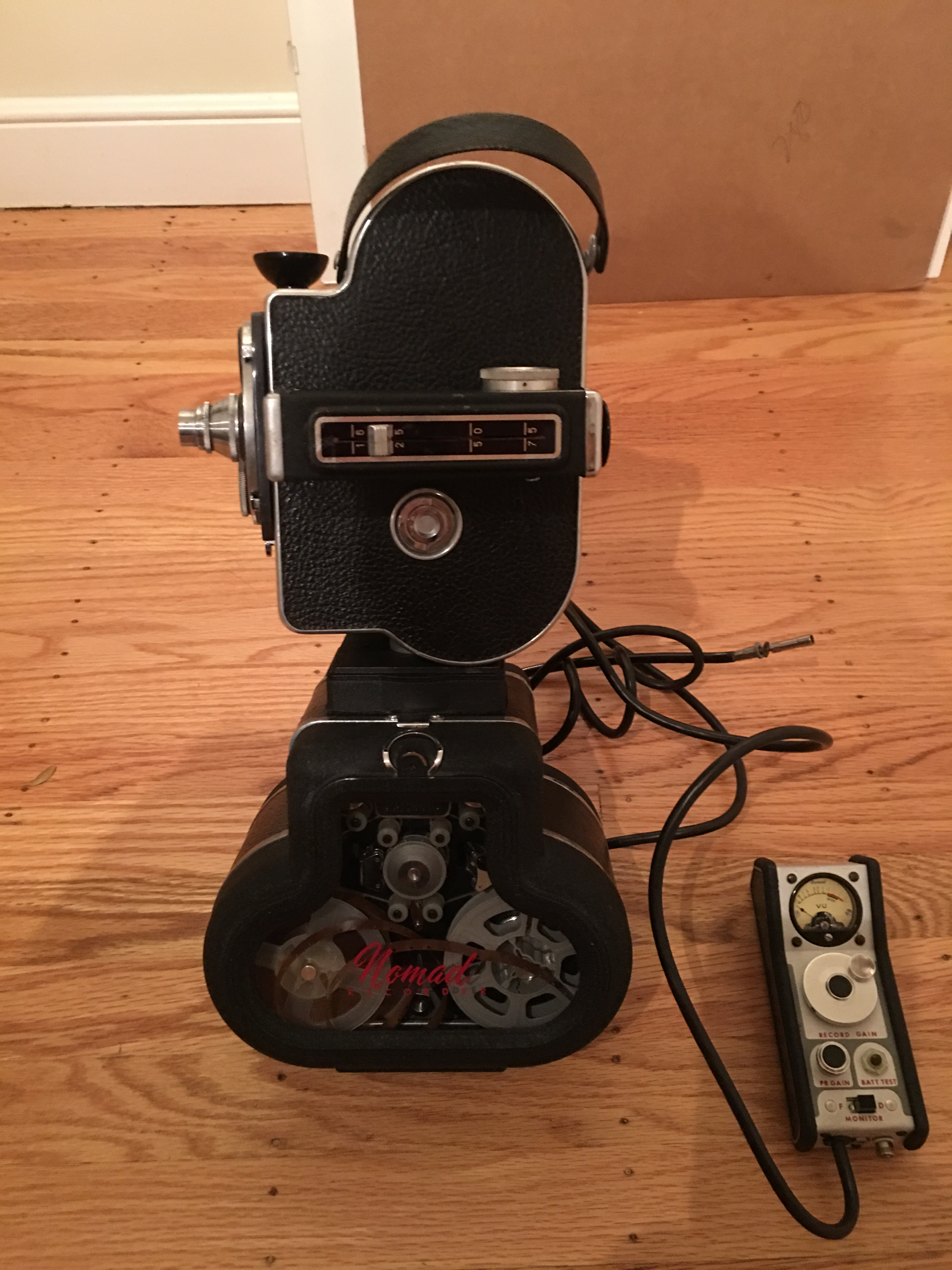
Magnsync Nomad recorder with Bolex 16 Camera

== Double-System Recorder Configurations ==
The Auricon System could alternatively function for 'double-system' sound recording provided that the camera motor drive was a synchronous motor.

Model	Date	Attributes
R-20	1940	Optical recorder 100 ft reels. Matches RA-20 Amplifier.
RT-80	1940	Self-blimped optical sound recorder, 200 ft reels, matched with NR-24 Amplifier.
RT-70-AAF	1943	Self-blimped optical sound recorder, 200 ft reels, matched with NR-24 Amplifier.
RM-30	1958	Optical recorder for 1200 ft reels.
CKS	1941	Synchronous motor drive for Kodak Cine Special. An accessory blimp (CKS-B) to house the CKS and Kodak was offered as a package. See, Patent US D133,626.
DPT-10		Dual Phonograph Turntable.

== Amplifier Models ==
Common attributes of the Auricon amplifiers were input connections for microphones, a headphone monitor, sound track meter for optical models; a volume meter; and battery tests. In operation external amplifiers and cameras were coupled via an umbilical signal cable delivering recording power and modulated sound to the camera galvanometer (optical) or recording head (magnetic). Magnetic amplifiers and cameras had the additional capability to monitor the recorded sound by a return signal from the camera.

=== Magnetic Recording ===
Model	Date	Attributes
MA-10	1957	Mini-tube amplifier.
MA-11		Transistor amplifier; 13.2v battery power; This model is generally termed "Filmagnetic".
BC-10		The ‘MA’ amplifier models, while battery powered, could be charged and operated from the companion BC-10 battery charger

=== Optical Recording ===
Where not specified, amplifiers are Variable Area, 7 volt lamp

Model	Date	Attributes
NR-20		Couple for CT-70 recorder.
NR-24-A7	1950	
NRS-24-A7		Shutter Noise Reduction
NR-25-A4		4 volt lamp
NR-25-S7	1962	Shutter Noise Reduction
NR-25-A7	1961	
NR-25-D7	1961	Variable Density
NR-40-A4	1956	4 volt lamp
NR-40-A7	1956	
NR-40-S4	1956	4 volt lamp; Shutter Noise Reduction
NR-40-S7	1956	Shutter Noise Reduction
NR-40-D4	1956	4 volt lamp; Variable Density
NR-40-D7	1956	Variable Density
RA-20	1940	4 volt lamp; matches SSB-CT camera
RA-22	1942	
RA-30-A7	1952	
RA-30-D7		Variable density
RA-31-A7	1957	

== Auricons in the Digital Era ==
Beginning with the 1980s, self blimped 16mm cameras like the Auricon were replaced by portable video camera recorders for news gathering. Nonetheless, they retained their popularity with independent film makers well into the 1990s: Auricons were for many years the most affordable self blimped 16mm sound cameras available on the second hand market. In the mid-1990s, Eastman Kodak discontinued 16mm magnetic striped film, making magnetic Auricons obsolete for sound-on-film recording. These models still found use in post-production recording of sound onto magnetic sound stock.

As long as 16mm film stock and processing remains available, the Auricon is still usable for filming both picture and recording optical sound-on-film (despite its lower fidelity compared to magnetic and digital recording). An active collector market exists as well.

Auricon collectors often check for the following when acquiring a camera on the secondary market:

- Inspecting the interior film chamber for either a magnetic recording pulley, or optical galvanometer with lamp.
- The power cable for the camera motor, which has proprietary connectors.
- An umbilical signal cable between the camera and amplifier.
- Included lenses and viewfinder optics/masks.
- Included microphones, headphones and cables (XLR or Jones)
- If the camera and/or amplifier are delivered with the original suitcase. This is an indication that the equipment may be in good shape, and may include some other supplies like spare lamps and filters.
- Drive belts to run the takeup motor on the external film magazine.

== Feature length films shot primarily with an Auricon ==
Narrative films:

- My Hustler
- Chelsea Girls
- Flesh
- Trash
- Women in Revolt
- Heat
- Lonesome Cowboys
- Maidstone
- Wanda
- Pink Flamingos

Documentaries:

- Monterey Pop
- Gimme Shelter
- Home for Life
