= Garrett Brown =

American cinematographer (born 1942)

- Steadicam inventor/operator Garrett Brown in 2026
- Born: April 6, 1942 (age 84); Long Branch, New Jersey
- Occupations: Cinematographer, Inventor
- Known for: Steadicam
- Children: Jonathan

Garrett Wood Brown (born April 6, 1942) is an American inventor, best known as the creator of the Steadicam. Brown's invention allows camera operators to film while walking without the normal shaking and jostles of a handheld camera. The Steadicam was first used in the Hal Ashby film Bound for Glory (1976), receiving an Academy Award (Best Cinematography), and has since been used on such films as Rocky, filming Rocky's running and training sequences, and Return of the Jedi, where Brown walked through a redwood forest with the Steadicam shooting film at 1 frame per second to achieve the illusion of high speed motion during the speeder-bike chase.

The sequence in Rocky that took the audience up what would later be known as the Rocky Steps of the Philadelphia Museum of Art for the triumphant moment at the top was first filmed during tests for the original Steadicam system. The system was used extensively on Stanley Kubrick's 1980 classic horror film The Shining, starring Jack Nicholson. Brown's Steadicam work can be seen in over seventy motion pictures. Additionally, Brown, Joe Dunton, and a London technician developed a UHF transmitter which allowed Kubrick to watch a live video feed of the filming on monitors in different rooms.

Brown has also invented the DiveCam (following Olympic divers), MobyCam (underwater camera following Olympic swimmers) and the SkyCam (for football games) with the latter perfected with help from a team including Anastas Michos, Larry McConkey, John Jurgens and others.

Garrett Brown is the father of TV director Jonathan Brown. Both worked together as Steadicam operators on the film Bulworth, directed by and starring Warren Beatty. A member of the American Society of Cinematographers and the Directors Guild of America, Garrett Brown was recipient of an Oscar for Scientific or Technical Achievement from the Academy of Motion Picture Arts and Sciences and an Emmy Award from the National Academy of Television Arts and Sciences for his invention of the Steadicam.

In July of 2026, EBE Productions announced it had begun production of a documentary on Brown titled Thank You, Mr. Brown being executive produced by Francis Ford Coppola.

== Early years ==
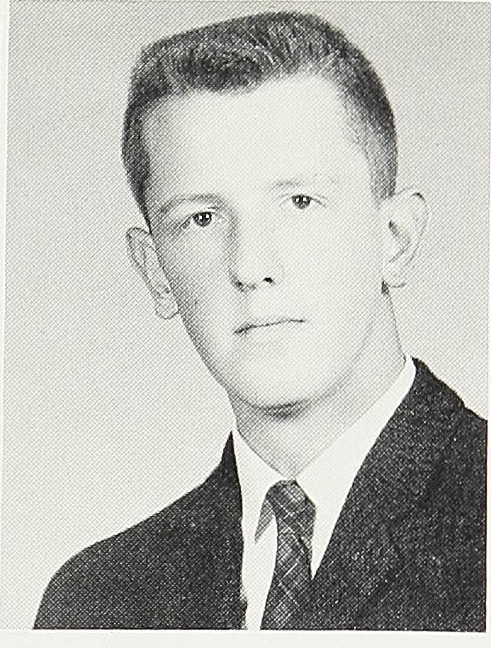
Brown's 1960 yearbook photo at Haverford High School

After his graduation from Haverford High School, he matriculated at Tufts University, where he met Al Dana. Together, they formed the folk duo Brown & Dana, and recorded the classic "It Was a Very Good Year", among others. Brown also attained a cult following for his radio advertisements with Anne Winn, especially for Molson Golden beer. Their witty repartee became a template for others.

== Inventions ==
Garrett Brown has invented multiple camera supports focusing mostly on camera stabilization.

- Equipois: A mechanical arm for heavy equipment.
- FlyCam: A closed loop, stabilized tracking camera system.
- DiveCam: The first dropping vertical camera system.
- GoCam: The ultra-light high speed camera tracking system.
- MobyCam: The first submarine tracking camera system.
- SkyCam: The first suspended flying camera system.
- Steadicam: The original handheld stabilizing system.
- Steadicam Merlin: Next generation hand held Steadicam system.
- Steadicam Tango: A new Steadicam accessory for floor-to-ceiling boom range.
- SuperFlyCam: An ultralight stabilized 35mm wire-borne flying camera.
- Zeen: Elevating walker chair. http://gozeen.com/

== Awards and recognitions ==
- 2013 – Joined the National Inventors Hall of Fame for his "Equipment for Use with Hand Held Motion Picture Cameras" Patent No. 4,017,168 the Steadicam® Camera Stabilizer.
- 2012 – Steadicam Guild Life Achievement Award.

=== Academy Award ===
- 2006 – Scientific and Engineering Award – For the original concept of the Skycam flying camera system - the first use of 3D volumetric cable technology for motion picture cinematography.
- 2001 – American Society of Cinematographers – President's Award
- 1999 – Technical Achievement Award – Shared with: Jerry Holway For the creation of the Skyman flying platform for Steadicam operators.
- 1978 – Academy Award of Merit – (The Cinema Products Corporation. Engineering Staff under the supervision of John Jurgens). For the invention and development of Steadicam.

=== Society of Camera Operators ===
- 2008 – Technical Achievement Award Shared with: Jerry Holway (inventor) (The Tiffen Company [us] (developer) ). For the Ultra2 Steadicam camera support system.
- 1998 – Historical Shot for: Bound for Glory (1976).
- 1992 – Technical achievement award Shared with: Ed Di Giulio (ceo Cinema Products) (Cinema Products (developer) ). For the Steadicam camera stabilizing system.

=== Nikola Tesla Satellite Award ===
- 2014 – For visionary achievement in filmmaking technology
