= Primetime Engineering Emmy Awards =

Television engineering and technology award

The Primetime Engineering Emmy Awards, or Engineering Emmys, are one of two sets of Emmy Awards that are presented for outstanding achievement in engineering development in the television industry. The Primetime Engineering Emmys are presented by the Academy of Television Arts & Sciences (ATAS), while the separate Technology and Engineering Emmy Awards are given by its sister organization, the National Academy of Television Arts and Sciences (NATAS).

The Primetime Engineering Emmy is presented to an individual, company or organization for engineering developments so significant an improvement on existing methods or so innovative in nature that they materially affect the transmission, recording or reception of television. The award is determined by a jury of highly qualified, experienced engineers in the television industry. In addition, since 2003 the ATAS also bestows in most years the Philo T. Farnsworth Award, which is a Primetime Engineering Emmy Award given to honor companies and organizations that have significantly affected the state of television and broadcast engineering over a long period of time, and the Charles F. Jenkins Lifetime Achievement Award, which has been given in most years since 1991 to one or more individuals whose contributions over time have significantly affected the state of television technology and engineering.

The Primetime Emmy Awards have been given since 1949 to recognize outstanding achievements in primetime television for performance, for the Creative Arts, and for Engineering. The Primetime Engineering Emmys have separately been given annually since 1978 (the year that ATAS and the NATAS agreed to split ties), although Special Emmys for Outstanding Achievement in Engineering Development were occasionally bestowed in prior years. The awards which have been given include the Engineering Emmys, which are accorded the Emmy Statuette, and two other levels of recognition, the Engineering Plaque, and the Engineering Citation

== Awards ==
1978

- Engineering Emmy Award: Petro Vlahos for the ULTIMATTE Video-Matting Device
- Engineering Citation: To the Society of Motion Picture and Television Engineers (SMPTE)

1979

- Engineering Emmy Award: Ampex Corporation for the Automatic Scan Tracking System for Helical Video Tape Equipment
- Engineering Citation: Magicam, Inc. for the Development of Real Time Tracking of Independent Scenes

1980

- Engineering Emmy Award: National Institute of Standards and Technology (NIST), Public Broadcasting Service (PBS), and American Broadcasting Company (ABC) for Closed Captioning for the Deaf System
- Engineering Emmy Citation: David Bargan for the '409' and 'TRACE' Computer Programs used for Off-line Videotape Editing
- Engineering Emmy Citation: Vital Industries for its Pioneering Development of Digital Video Manipulation Technology
- Engineering Emmy Citation: Convergence Corporation for the ECS-100 Video Tape Editing Systems

1981

- Engineering Emmy Award: Rank Cintel for the Mark III Flying Spot Telecine

1982

- Engineering Emmy Award: Hal Collins for Contributions to the Art and Development of Videotape Editing (posthumous)
- Engineering Emmy Award: Dubner Computer Systems, Inc., and the American Broadcasting Company (ABC) for the Dubner CBG-2 Electronic Character and Background Generator
- Engineering Citation: Chapman Studio Equipment for the Development of Crane Systems

1983

- Engineering Emmy Award: Eastman Kodak for the Development of High Speed Color Film 5294/7294 Color Negative Film
- Engineering Citation: Ikegami Electronics for the Development of the EC-35 (a camera used for electronic cinematography)
- Engineering Citation: Ampex Corporation for Digital Effects Displaying Capabilities with Improved Picture Quality

1984

- Engineering Emmy Award: None given
- Engineering Citation: Corporate Communications Consultants Inc. for the 60XL Color Correction by Armand Belmares Sarabia

1985

- Engineering Emmy Award: Auricle Control Systems (ACS) for the Auricle Time Processor

1986

- Engineering Emmy Award: Nagra, Inc., for the Nagra Recorder
- Engineering Emmy Award: CBS, Sony and Cinedco for Design and Implementation of Electronic Editing Systems for Film Programs

1987

- Engineering Emmy Award: Spectra Image, Inc. for D220 Dual Headed Video Disc Player

1988

- Engineering Emmy Award: Optical Disc Corporation for the Recordable Laser Videodisc System
- Engineering Emmy Award: Sony for the DVR-1000 Component Digital VTR

1989

- Engineering Emmy Award: Pacific Video Inc. for the Electronic Laboratory
- Engineering Emmy Award: Cinema Products Corporation for the Steadicam
- Engineering Plaque: Composite Image Systems for the Pin Registered Transfer Process
- Engineering Plaque: Istec, Inc. for the WESCAM Camera Mount
- Engineering Plaque: Matthews Studio Electronics for the Nettman Cam-Remote
- Engineering Plaque: Offbeat Systems for the Streamline Scoring System
- Engineering Plaque: Steadi-Film Corporation for the Steadi-Film System
- Engineering Plaque: UCLA Film and Television Archive for the restoration of the Fred Astaire Specials

1990

- Engineering Emmy Award: Comark Communications, Inc. and Varian/Eimac for the Klystrode UHF High Power Amplifier Tube and Transmitter
- Engineering Emmy Award: Zaxcom Video, Inc. for the TBC Control System
- Engineering Plaque: Samuelson Alga Cinema for the Louma Camera Crane
- Engineering Plaque: Alan Gordon Enterprises for Image 300 35mm High Speed Camera

1991

- Engineering Emmy Award: Vari-Lite for the Series 200 Lighting System
- Engineering Emmy Award: Camera Platforms International, Inc. for the D/ESAM Digital Mixer
- Engineering Plaque: Manfred Klemme for the Dcode TS-1 Time Code Slate
- Engineering Plaque: Lightmaker Company for the AC/DC HMI Ballast
- Engineering Plaque: George Hill for Optex UK - Mini Image Intensifier for ENG Cameras
- Engineering Plaque: Grass Valley Group for the Kadenza Digital Picture Processor
- Charles F. Jenkins Lifetime Achievement Award: Harry Lubcke

1992

- Engineering Emmy Award: Charles Douglass for the Invention and Development of the Post Production Sweetener
- Engineering Emmy Award: The Accom D-Bridge 122 Video Encoder
- Engineering Plaque: Filmlook, Inc. for the Filmlook Process for Film Simulation
- Charles F. Jenkins Lifetime Achievement Award: Kerns H. Powers

1993

- Engineering Emmy Award: Avid Technology for the Media Composer
- Engineering Emmy Award: Fox Television for the Fox Box
- Engineering Emmy Award: Newtek for Video Toaster
- Engineering Plaque: CBS Laboratories for Mini-Rapid Deployment Earth Terminal (RADET)
- Engineering Plaque: Les Aseere for the scientific detective work that solved the mystery of type "C" video tape dropout and ventilated scanner debris.
- Charles F. Jenkins Lifetime Achievement Award: Richard S. O'Brien

1994

- Engineering Emmy Award: Philips Var-Lite for the VL5 Wash Luminaire
- Engineering Emmy Award: Kodak for the Keykode Edgeprint Film Numbering System
- Engineering Plaque: Cinema Products Corporation, Research in Motion, Evertz Microsystems, and the National Film Board of Canada, four creative hardware developers whose reader, decoder and user technology enabled the widespread use of Keykode.

1995

- Engineering Emmy Award: C-Cube Microsystems for the MPEG Encoding Chip Set
- Engineering Emmy Award: Barber Technologies for the Barber Boom
- Engineering Emmy Award: Tascam for the DA-88 Digital Multitrack Recorder
- Engineering Emmy Award: Philips Laboratories for the Ghost Cancellation
- Engineering Plaque: Saunders Electric Incorporated for the Synchronized Load Commander System and Mobile Power Distribution
- Charles F. Jenkins Lifetime Achievement Award: Julius Barnathan

1996

- Engineering Emmy Award: LaserPacific Media Corporation for the Supercomputer Assembly
- Engineering Emmy Award: General Instrument Corporation for the Digicipher Digital Television System
- Engineering Emmy Award: Scientific-Atlanta for the Powervu Digital Video Compression System
- Engineering Emmy Award: Tektronix for the Profile Professional Disk Recorder
- Charles F. Jenkins Lifetime Achievement Award: Joseph Flaherty

1997

- Engineering Emmy Award: J.L. Fisher for the J.L. Fisher Camera Dolly
- Engineering Emmy Award: Panasonic for the AJ-LT75 DVCPRO Laptop Editor
- Engineering Emmy Award: Grand Alliance for the Digital TV Standard
- Engineering Plaque: The BOOM TRAC Microphone Dolly System
- Engineering Plaque: Alan Gordon Enterprises for the Mark V Director's Viewfinder
- Charles F. Jenkins Lifetime Achievement Award: Richard E. Wiley

1998

- Engineering Emmy Award: Brian Critchley of Digital Projection International and Larry Hornbeck of Texas Instruments' for the Digital Micromirror Device POWER Displays Projector
- Engineering Emmy Award: Tiffen for the Design and Manufacture of State-of-the-art Camera Lens Filters
- Engineering Emmy Award: Philips Digital Video Systems and Eastman Kodak for the Design and Manufacture of the Industry-Standard High-definition Digital Telecine
- Engineering Plaque: Avid for the Real-Time Multicamera System
- Engineering Plaque: Tektronix for the Lightworks 'Heavyworks' Multistream Editing Systems
- Charles F. Jenkins Lifetime Achievement Award: Yves Faroudja

1999

- Engineering Emmy Award: Sony for the HDCAM HDW-500 Digital HD Studio VTR
- Engineering Emmy Award: George Hill and Derek Lightbody for Optex UK., for the Aurasoft Soft Light
- Engineering Plaque: Videotek for the VTM-200 Series Multi-Format, On-Screen Monitoring
- Engineering Plaque: Spectracine, Inc., for the Spectra Professional IV-A Digital Exposure Meter
- Charles F. Jenkins Lifetime Achievement Award: Charles A. Steinberg

2000

- Engineering Emmy Award: The Dorrough Loudness Meter
- Engineering Emmy Award: The Panavision Lightweight Camera
- Engineering Emmy Award: Clairmont Camera for the MovieCam Superlight
- Engineering Plaque: Lipsner-Smith Company and Consolidated Film Industries (CFI) for their joint development of the Model CF-8200 Ultrasonic Film Cleaning Machine
- Engineering Plaque: TEAC America, Inc. for the MMR-8 and MMP-16 Recorders
- Engineering Plaque: Soundmaster Group for the Integrated Operations Nucleus ION Operating Environment
- Engineering Plaque: Cooke Optics for Cooke Prime Lenses
- Charles F. Jenkins Lifetime Achievement Award: Charles Mesak

2001

- Engineering Emmy Award: Vari-Lite for the VARI*LITE Virtuoso Console
- Engineering Emmy Award: Cast Lighting, Ltd. for WYSIWYG
- Engineering Emmy Award: Da Vinci Systems for 2K Color Enhancement System
- Engineering Emmy Award: Pandora International for Pogle Platinum with MegaDef
- Engineering Emmy Award: Panavision for the Primo Lens Series
- Engineering Emmy Award: Apple, Inc. for FireWire
- Engineering Emmy Award: Clairmont Camera for Clairmont Camera Lenses
- Engineering Plaque: Chapman and Leonard Studio Equipment, Inc. for the LenCin Pedestal
- Charles F. Jenkins Lifetime Achievement Award: Gilbert P. Wyland

2002

- Engineering Emmy Award: TM Systems for The Digital Solution to Language Translation, Dubbing and Subtitling
- Engineering Emmy Award: Apple Inc. for Final Cut Pro
- Engineering Emmy Award: 2d3 for the Boujou Automated Camera Tracker
- Engineering Emmy Award: ARRI for Arriflex Cameras
- Engineering Plaque: Barber Technologies for the EZ Prompter
- Engineering Plaque: HBO Interactive Ventures for Band Of Brothers Interactive Television Programming
- Charles F. Jenkins Lifetime Achievement Award: Charles Cappleman

2003

- Engineering Emmy Award: Dedo Weigert of Dedotec, USA Inc. for the Dedolight 400 Series Lighting System
- Engineering Emmy Award: Emory Cohen, Randolph Blim and Doug Jaqua of LaserPacific Media Corporation for the 24P HDTV Post-Production System
- Engineering Emmy Award: David Pringle, Leonard Pincus, Ashot Nalbandyan, Thomas Kong and George Johnson of Lightning Strikes, Inc. for Softsun
- Engineering Plaque: NewTek, Inc. for LightWave 3D
- Charles F. Jenkins Lifetime Achievement Award: Ray Dolby
- Philo T. Farnsworth Corporate Achievement Engineering Award: Panavision

2004

- Engineering Emmy Award: Dolby Laboratories for the Dolby LM 100 Broadcast Loudness Meter With Dialogue Intelligence
- Engineering Emmy Award: Sony and Panavision for the First 24P Digital Imaging System
- Engineering Plaque: Philip John Greenstreet of Rosco Laboratories, Inc. for Roscolite Scenic Backdrops
- Engineering Plaque: David Grober and Scott Lewallen of Motion Picture Marine for Perfect Horizon
- Charles F. Jenkins Lifetime Achievement Award: Les Paul
- Philo T. Farnsworth Corporate Achievement Engineering Award: Chyron Corporation

2005

- Engineering Emmy Award: Dolby Laboratories for Dolby E Audio Coding Technology
- Engineering Emmy Award: Sprint Corporation for Sprint PCS VisionSM Multimedia Services
- Engineering Emmy Award: Toon Boom Animation Inc. for USAnimation Opus
- Engineering Emmy Award: MobiTV for the first mobile television network and technology platform to bring live broadcasts to mobile phones.
- Engineering Plaque: Litepanels, Inc for Litepanels Mini LED Light

2006

- Engineering Emmy Award: None awarded
- Engineering Plaque: Scott Walker, Mark Walker, Jeff Watts, Scott Noe, Richard Brooker of BOXX Communications, LLC for Vid-Wave Boxx
- Engineering Plaque: Harry Fagle for the Four-Channel Video Integrator (Quad-Split)

2007

- Engineering Emmy Award: None awarded
- Engineering Plaque: TM Systems, LLC for the TM Systems QC Station
- Engineering Plaque: Osram Sylvania for Osram HMI Metal Halide Lamp Technology
- Engineering Plaque: Digital Vision for DVNR Image Processing Hardware and DVO Image Processing Software
- Engineering Plaque: Silicon Optix for the Teranex Video Computer
- Charles F. Jenkins Lifetime Achievement Award: Howard A. Anderson, Jr.

2008

- Engineering Emmy Award: Joint Video Team Standards Committee (JVT) for the development of the High Profile for H.264/MPEG-4 AVC.
- Engineering Emmy Award: Glenn Sanders and Howard Stark of Zaxcom, Inc. for the Deva Location Sound Recorder.
- Engineering Plaque: Scott Leva for the Precision Stunt Air Bag
- Engineering Plaque: Sebastian Cramer and Andreas Dasser of P+S Technik GmbH for the Skater Dolly Product Family
- Engineering Plaque: Craige Bandy and Ed Bandy of Tricam Video Productions Company for the 360 Overhead Jib
- Engineering Plaque: Georg Dole, Swen Gerards, Jan Huewel and Daniel Schaefer of Coolux Media Systems for Pandoras Box Real-Time Compositing Media Server
- Charles F. Jenkins Lifetime Achievement Award: Woo Paik
- Philo T. Farnsworth Corporate Achievement Engineering Award: Evertz Technologies Limited

2009

- Engineering Emmy Award: Dolby Laboratories for the Dolby DP600 Program Optimizer
- Engineering Emmy Award: Fujinon and NHK for the Fujinon Precision Focus Assistance System
- Engineering Emmy Award: Jim Henson's Creature Shop for the Henson Digital Puppetry Studio
- Engineering Emmy Award: Litepanels, Inc.for Litepanels LED Lighting Products
- Engineering Plaque: Herb Ault, Aaron Hammel and Bob Anderson of Grip Trix, Inc., for the Grip Trix Electric Motorized Camera Dolly
- Philo T. Farnsworth Corporate Achievement Engineering Award: The National Aeronautics and Space Administration (NASA). In commemoration of the 40th anniversary of the technological innovations that made possible the first live broadcast from the lunar surface by the crew of Apollo 11 on July 20, 1969.

2010

- Engineering Emmy Award: Stagetec for the NEXUS Digital Audio Routing
- Engineering Plaque: Apple, Inc. for Apple Final Cut Studio
- Engineering Plaque: Avid Technology for Avid Media Access
- Engineering Plaque: David Eubank for the pCAM Film + Digital Calculator
- Engineering Plaque: Showtime Sports Interactive
- Charles F. Jenkins Lifetime Achievement Award: Ron Estes and Robert Seidenglanz
- Philo T. Farnsworth Corporate Achievement Engineering Awards: Desilu and Digidesign (now Avid Technology)

2011

- Engineering Emmy Award: IBM and Fox Group for the Development and Application of LTFS (Linear Tape File System)
- Engineering Emmy Award: Panavision and Sony for Single Chip Digital Camera Technology used for Primetime Television Production.
- Engineering Emmy Award: Ultimate Arm, for the Ultimate Gyrostabilized Remote Controlled Crane
- Engineering Emmy Award: Apple, Inc. for the iPad
- Engineering Plaque: Yahoo! for Connected TV to Yahoo!
- Engineering Certificate: The Xfinity iPad app
- Engineering Certificate: Time Warner iPad app
- Charles F. Jenkins Lifetime Achievement Award: Andy Setos
- Philo T. Farnsworth Corporate Achievement Engineering Awards: Time Warner and Time Warner Cable for the creation of the Full Service Network

2012

- Engineering Emmy Award: Colorfront, Ltd. for Colorfront On-Set Dailies
- Engineering Emmy Award: FilmLight for Truelight On-Set and Baselight TRANSFER
- Engineering Emmy Award: Academy of Motion Picture Arts and Sciences for the Academy Color Encoding System (ACES)
- Engineering Emmy Award: The American Society of Cinematographers (ASC) Technology Committee for the ASC Color Decision List (ASC CDL)
- Engineering Emmy Award: Dolby Laboratories Inc. for the Dolby PRM-4200 Professional Reference Monitor
- Engineering Emmy Award: Sony for the BVM E250 OLED Reference Monitor.
- Engineering Emmy Award: Toon Boom Animation Inc. for the Toon Boom Storyboard Pro
- Engineering Emmy Award: Netflix Inc. for its new streaming video service.
- Engineering Plaque: Adobe Systems for the Adobe Pass Viewer Authentication process
- Charles F. Jenkins Lifetime Achievement Award: Dr. Richard Green
- Philo T. Farnsworth Corporate Achievement Engineering Award: Eastman Kodak Company

2013

- Engineering Emmy Award: YouTube
- Engineering Emmy Award: Aspera, for FASP Transport Technology
- Engineering Emmy Award: Josh C. Kline of Digital Dailies Web Based Streaming Production Dailies and Cuts
- Engineering Emmy Award: iZotope for RX Audio Repair Technology (iZotope)
- Engineering Emmy Award: Lightcraft Technology for Previzion Virtual Studio System
- Engineering Plaque: LAWO AG Audio networking and routing system for large scale television entertainment productions
- Engineering Plaque: Final Draft Inc., Final Draft Screenwriting Software
- Charles F. Jenkins Lifetime Achievement Award: Chris Cookson
- Philo T. Farnsworth Corporate Achievement Engineering Award: Sennheiser Electronic Corporation

2014

- Engineering Emmy Award: Philips Professional Broadcasting for the LDK6000, DPM CCD Multi-format HDTV Camera System
- Engineering Emmy Award: Sony Professional Solutions of America for the Multi-format HDTV CCD Fiber Optic Camera System
- Engineering Emmy Award: High-Definition Multimedia Interface (HDMI)
- Engineering Emmy Award: Intel Corp for High-bandwidth Digital Content Protection (HDCP)
- Engineering Emmy Award: Advanced Television Systems Committee (ATSC) for its Recommended Practice on Techniques for Establishing and Maintaining Audio Loudness for Digital Television
- Charles F. Jenkins Lifetime Achievement Award: Laurence J. Thorpe
- Philo T. Farnsworth Corporate Achievement Engineering Award: The Society of Motion Picture and Television Engineers (SMPTE)

2015

- Engineering Emmy Award: Mark Franken for EdiCue
- Engineering Emmy Award: Michael Sechrest, Chris King, and Greg Croft for SpeedTree
- Engineering Emmy Award: Zhou Wang, Alan Bovik, Hamid Sheikh and Eero Simoncelli for the Structural Similarity (SSIM) Video Quality Measurement Model
- Charles F. Jenkins Lifetime Achievement Award: Garrett Brown
- Philo T. Farnsworth Corporate Achievement Engineering Award: Grass Valley USA, LLC

The 67th Primetime Emmy Engineering Awards Ceremony took place on October 28, 2015 at Loews Hollywood Hotel.

2016

- Engineering Emmy Award: SyncOnSet software application for production design
- Engineering Emmy Award: Ncam Technologies for camera tracking technology
- Engineering Emmy Award: Sony for the Sony 2/3" 4K Imaging System
- Engineering Emmy Award: Saunders Electric for Saunders Mobile UPS Power Station
- Engineering Emmy Award: Zaxcom Inc for innovations in digital wireless technology.
- Engineering Emmy Award: Group It For Me! cloud-based software
- Charles F. Jenkins Lifetime Achievement Award: John C. Malone
- Philo T. Farnsworth Corporate Achievement Engineering Award: NHK's Science & Technology Research Laboratories

The 68th Primetime Emmy Engineering Awards Ceremony took place on October 26, 2016 at Loews Hollywood Hotel.

2017

- Engineering Emmy Award: Arri for ARRI Alexa Camera System
- Engineering Emmy Award: Canon Inc and Fujifilm (Fujinon) for 4K Zoom Lenses
- Engineering Emmy Award: The Walt Disney Company for Disney Global Localization
- Engineering Emmy Award: McDSP for the SA-2 Dialog Processor
- Engineering Emmy Award: Joint Collaborative Team on Video Coding (JCT-VC) for High Efficiency Video Coding (HEVC)
- Engineering Emmy Award: Shotgun Software
- Charles F. Jenkins Lifetime Achievement Award: Leonardo Chiariglione
- Philo T. Farnsworth Corporate Achievement Engineering Award: Sony Corporation

The 69th Primetime Emmy Engineering Awards Ceremony took place on October 25, 2017 at Loews Hollywood Hotel.

2018

- Engineering Emmy Award: Chemical Wedding for Artemis Digital Director's Viewfinder
- Engineering Emmy Award: Cospective for cineSync Review and Approval
- Engineering Emmy Award: Codex Digital for Codex Recording Platform and Capture Media
- Engineering Emmy Award: Blue Microphones for Blue Mix-Fi Headphones
- Engineering Emmy Award: Production Resource Group for PRG GroundControl Followspot
- Engineering Plaque: Customized Animal Tracking Solutions (CATS) for the CATS Cam: Animal-Borne Multi-Sensor Video System
- Charles F. Jenkins Lifetime Achievement Award: Wendy Aylsworth
- Philo T. Farnsworth Corporate Achievement Engineering Award: Avid

The 70th Primetime Emmy Engineering Awards Ceremony took place on October 24, 2018 at the JW Marriott Hotel LA Live.

2019

- Engineering Emmy Award: Boris FX for Sapphire
- Engineering Emmy Award: iZotope for RX 7 Audio Repair
- Engineering Emmy Award: FabFilter for Pro-Q3 Audio Equalizer
- Engineering Emmy Award: SilhouetteFX LLC for SilhouetteFX Rotoscoping
- Engineering Emmy Award: Boris FX for Mocha Pro Motion Tracking System
- Engineering Emmy Award: Joint Photographic Experts Group for JPEG Image Compression
- Charles F. Jenkins Lifetime Achievement Award: Hugo Gaggioni
- Philo T. Farnsworth Corporate Achievement Engineering Award: The American Society of Cinematographers (ASC)

The 71st Primetime Emmy Engineering Awards Ceremony took place on October 23, 2019 at the JW Marriott Hotel LA Live.

2020

- Engineering Emmy Award: Evercast for Evercast real-time collaboration platform
- Engineering Emmy Award: HP Inc for ZCentral Remote Boost
- Engineering Emmy Award: Sohonet for ClearView Flex
- Engineering Emmy Award: Teradici for Cloud Access Software
- Engineering Emmy Award: Apple Inc for Apple ProRes
- Engineering Emmy Award: CODEX for CODEX RAW Workflow
- Engineering Emmy Award: Dan Dugan for Gain Sharing Automatic Microphone Mixing
- Engineering Emmy Award: Epic Games for Unreal Engine
- Engineering Emmy Award: RE:Vision Effects for optical flow-based postproduction video tools
- Engineering Emmy Award: Sound Radix for Sound Radix Auto-Align Post
- Engineering Emmy Award: Bill Spitzak, Jonathan Egstad, Peter Crossley, and Jerry Huxtable for Nuke

The 72nd Primetime Emmy Engineering Awards Ceremony was streamed live on Emmys.com on Thursday, Oct. 29, 2020 at 5:00 p.m. PDT.

2021

- Engineering Emmy Award: Marcos Fajardo, Alan King, and Thiago Ize for Arnold Global Illumination Rendering System
- Engineering Emmy Award: ARRI for ARRI Skypanel
- Engineering Emmy Award: CEDAR Audio Ltd. for CEDAR Studio
- Engineering Emmy Award: Golaem for Golaem Crowd
- Engineering Emmy Award: Stephen Regelous for Massive
- Engineering Emmy Award: Steve Vitolo, Felipe A. Mendez, and Franco Zuccar for Scriptation
- Engineering Emmy Award: Nicolaas Verheem, Marius van der Watt, Dennis Scheftner, and Zvi Reznic for Teradek Bolt 4K
- Engineering Emmy Award: Chaos for V-Ray
- Charles F. Jenkins Lifetime Achievement Award: Reed Hastings
- Philo T. Farnsworth Corporate Achievement Engineering Award: Dolby Laboratories

The 73rd Primetime Emmy Engineering Awards Ceremony took place on Thursday, Oct. 21, at the JW Marriott Hotel, Los Angeles LA LIVE.

2022

- Engineering Emmy Award: Mark Hills and Marc Bakos for the Cleanfeed Remote Audio Review/Recording System
- Engineering Emmy Award: Disguise Technologies Ltd. for the Disguise Platform
- Engineering Emmy Award: Industrial Light & Magic for the StageCraft Virtual Production Tool Suite
- Engineering Emmy Award: Geoffrey Crawshaw and William Brinkley for the Leostream Remote Access Software
- Engineering Emmy Award: Shure Incorporated for the Axient Digital Wireless Audio System
- Engineering Emmy Award: Sohonet for the ClearView Pivot Remote Collaboration Tool
- Engineering Emmy Award: Stype Cajic, Andrija Cajic, Daniel Kruselj, and Ivica Antolkovic for the stYpe Suite of Optical/Camera Tracking Tools
- Charles F. Jenkins Lifetime Achievement Award: Paul Debevec
- Philo T. Farnsworth Corporate Achievement Engineering Award: ARRI

The 74th Primetime Emmy Engineering Awards Ceremony took place on Wednesday, Sept. 28, 2022 at the Maybourne Hotel in Beverly Hills

2023

- Engineering Emmy Award: Chris Deighton, Richard Mead, Adrian Jeakins, and Evangelos Apostolopoulos for the Brompton Technology Tessera SX40 LED video processor
- Engineering Emmy Award: Steve Rosenbluth, Thomas E. Burgess, Konstantin Smola, and Glen Winchester for the Concept Overdrive Motion System
- Engineering Emmy Award: International Telecommunication Union – Radiocommunications – Study Group 6 for the Standardization of High Dynamic Range Television (HDR-TV)
- Engineering Emmy Award: Raymond Drewry and Jim Helman for the Entertainment Identifier Registry (EIDR)
- Engineering Emmy Award: David Eubank for the pCAM Pro
- Engineering Emmy Award: Thomas Riedel, Jake Dodson, Wolfgang Fritz, and Jiou-Pahn Lee for the Riedel BOLERO Wireless Intercom
- Engineering Emmy Award: Jeffrey Gray, Russell Hocken, Barrett Phillips, and Greg Smokler for the SmallHD Monitor Platform
- Engineering Emmy Award: Meir Shashoua, Yaniv Alon, and Shai Fishman for the Waves Clarity Vx Pro
- Charles F. Jenkins Lifetime Achievement Award: Birney Dayton
- Philo T. Farnsworth Corporate Achievement Engineering Award: National Association of Broadcasters (NAB)

The 75th Primetime Emmy Engineering Awards Ceremony took place at the Television Academy’s Saban Media Center on Wednesday, Oct. 18, 2023.

2024

- Engineering Emmy Award: George Dochev and Peter Thompson for the development of LucidLink
- Engineering Emmy Award: Ian Sampson for the development of Hush Pro
- Engineering Emmy Award: Fraunhofer IIS and intoPIX for the development of JPEG XS
- Engineering Emmy Award: Society of Motion Picture and Television Engineers (SMPTE), European Broadcasting Union (EBU) and Video Services Forum (VSF) for the development of the SMPTE ST 2110 Suite of Standards
- Engineering Emmy Award: Mark T. Noel, Jesse Noel, Casey D. Noel and J.D. Schwalm for the development of the NACMO series of motion bases
- Engineering Emmy Award: Jayson Dumenigo for the development of Action Factory’s Play’n with Fire Hydrogels
- Engineering Emmy Award: Rob Drewett and Andy Nancollis for the development of the AGITO Dolly System
- Engineering Emmy Award: Andy Carluccio, Jonathan Kokotajlo, Eyal Hadida and Brendan Ittelson for the development of Zoom for Broadcast
- Engineering Emmy Award: Boris Yamnitsky, Jason Clement, Mike Escola and Peter McAuley for the development of Boris FX Continuum
- Charles F. Jenkins Lifetime Achievement Award: Mark Schubin
- Philo T. Farnsworth Corporate Achievement Engineering Award: BBC Research & Development

The 76th Primetime Emmy Engineering Awards Ceremony took place at the Television Academy’s Saban Media Center on Wednesday, Oct. 14, 2025.

== See also ==
- List of American television awards
- List of engineering awards
