= Tiffen (disambiguation) =

Tiffen may refer to:

- Tiffen, English surname of Norman origin
- Tiffen (company), American filter manufacturer
- Tiffen, Carinthia, Austrian village
