= Darcy Antonellis =

American businesswoman

- Born: April 16; Newark, New Jersey
- Education: Temple University; Fordham University
- Occupation: businesswoman
- Title: CEO

Darcy Antonellis FSMPTE is an American businesswoman who was Chief Executive Officer of Vubiquity, Division President of Amdocs Media, and President of Warner Bros Technical Operations.

== Early life and education ==
Antonellis was born in Newark, New Jersey on April 16.

In 1984, she graduated from Temple University with a Bachelors in Electrical engineering.

In 1996, she received a master's degree in Finance at Fordham University.

== Career ==
Antonellis was the Head of Operations at the CBS News department in Washington, D.C. She became Vice President, Technical Operations in New York. Antonellis then became Vice President, Technical and Olympic Operations for CBS Sports. She organized the CBS coverage at three Winter Olympics; Albertville, Lillehammer, and Nagano (the 1998 Olympics). She also was Director of Operations in Saudi Arabia and Kuwait during the First Gulf War.

In 1998, she moved to Warner Bros. as Senior Vice President, Distribution Technologies & Operations, receiving promotion to Executive Vice-President, Distribution Technologies & Operations in 2003. In 2004, she became Senior Vice-President for Worldwide Anti-Piracy Operations. She oversaw the creation of the world's first corporate anti-piracy operation, to be headquartered in Burbank, California but with a presence in London, Germany, South America and Asia.

In 2008, Antonellis became President of Warner Bros Technical Operations, reporting to Kevin Tsujihara and succeeding Chris Cookson. Her new responsibility was to oversee the supply chain, although she retained her previous anti-piracy jurisdiction.

In 2014, Antonellis joined Vubiquity as CEO.

== Memberships and awards ==
In 2003, Antonellis was made a Fellow of the Society of Motion Picture and Television Engineers (SMPTE). Her alma mater, Temple University, has also recognised her achievements in engineering.

She received two Emmy Awards, a Technology Leadership Award in 2007, and was a manager of the Hollywood division of the SMPTE.

In October 2021, it was announced that Antonellis would be awarded a Lifetime Achievement Award From the Hollywood Professional Association.

== Personal life ==
Antonellis is the mother of two children, Andrea and Sebastian.

She is passionate about sports and is a Philadelphia Eagles fan.
