= Tiffen =

Tiffen is a surname.

Notable people with this surname include:

- Haidee Tiffen (born 1979), New Zealand cricket player
- Henry Stokes Tiffen (1816-1896), New Zealand surveyor
- Ira Tiffen (born 1951), American optics designer
- Jessamy Tiffen (fl. 2020), Australian scientist
- Kathleen Tiffen (1912-1986), British hurdler
- Mary Tiffen (1931–2020), British economic historian and international development professional
- Rodney Tiffen, Australian political scientist
