= Sohonet =

Sohonet is a community-of-interest network for the television, film and media production community based in the Soho area of London.

== History ==
Founded in 1995 by a group of post-production companies, Sohonet links many of the British film studios to London's post-production community. Sohonet also provides access to the Internet, and private wide-area links to other countries.

== Global network ==
The system links film and media companies, TV broadcasters, publishers, Internet providers, graphic designers and recording studios via transatlantic fibre connections to a global media network in the United States, (Los Angeles, New York City, Hawaii, Chicago, Seattle, Atlanta, etc.), Canada (Vancouver, Toronto, Montreal), New Zealand, Australia, France, Netherlands, Germany, Spain, Singapore and Italy ( Rome) and the ability to provide connectivity to other locations worldwide via Fibre Optic links.

Leading British film studios, Pinewood Studios, Shepperton Studios, Three Mills Studios, Twickenham Film Studios, Longcross Studios and Warner Bros. Studios, Leavesden, have direct optical fiber connectivity to the Sohonet London Fiber Ring, with campus connectivity on the sites provided via fiber and VDSL technologies. As well as may other studios globally, Australian examples Village Roadshow Studios, Melbourne City Studios, and Los Angeles shooting film studios Hollywood Center Studios, and Red Studios Hollywood, as well as Warner Bros., Universal Studios, HBO to name a few.

== Technology ==
A pioneering user of IP-over-ATM networking, Sohonet has since moved away from ATM to using gigabit Ethernet, 10 Gigabit Ethernet and MPLS technologies, including the use of wavelength division multiplexing on backbone connections. Sohonet is one of the pioneers of tapeless digital intermediate, and one of the instigators of the media dispatch protocol developed by the Pro-MPEG consortium, which later became a SMPTE standard. All types of media file formats, from QuickTime DV MPEG AES/EBU MXF through OMFi, AAF, OpenEXR, to 4k DPX files are supported.

Sohonet has its own private optical fibre networks in several cities and provides high speed object storage based on OpenStack Swift, in number of locations worldwide Los Angeles, London, and Sydney. On top of these stores, Sohonet operates a fast file transfer service called FileRunner. Sohonet also provides high speed secure connections, referred to as FastLane, into a number of public cloud providers Google Cloud Platform, SoftLayer, and Amazon Web Services, to enable large scale Cloud computing for 3D rendering.

== Awards ==
In 2020, Sohonet won a Primetime Engineering Emmy Award for its collaborative video review and editing platform, ClearView Flex. The Clearview Flex platform was also among the winners of the Advanced Imaging Society's Entertainment Technology Lumiere Awards for 2020.

In 2022, Sohonet won an additional Primetime Engineering Emmy Award for its ClearView Pivot remote collaboration tool, Clearview Pivot.
