= Sydney Daily Telegraph controversies =

The Daily Telegraph is an Australian tabloid newspaper published by Nationwide News Pty Limited. Over the years, it has faced numerous controversies, particularly regarding alleged breaches of media ethics in its coverage of LGBTQ people.

== Breaches of media ethics in coverage of LGBTQ people ==
In 2017, a report by LGBTQ rights watchdog Rainbow Rights Watch, analysing more than 8 million published words, found that reporting in Australian press publications Daily Telegraph, Herald Sun, and The Australian were calculated to inflame fear, uncertainty, and confusion about transgender people and issues, and that the Australian Press Council was ineffectual at upholding long term balance and good media ethics.

On 9 June 2021, Sydney University researcher Dr Alexandra Garcia published a corpus linguistics analysis of reporting about LGBTQ Australians by the Daily Telegraph and affiliated Newscorp mastheads, the Herald Sun and The Australian. Following an analysis of more than one million published words, Dr Garcia concluded that the Daily Telegraph and its associated publications covered transgender people and issues substantially more than any other organization and the coverage was overwhelmingly negative, with more than 90% of articles representing transgender Australians in a strongly negative light. The research found that the publication of Advisory Guidelines by the Australian Press Council had not improved the standard of reporting, with most reports and columns being characterized by fear-mongering, misrepresentation of medical science, divisive rhetoric, derogatory language, and suppression and under-representation of the voice of transgender people. One commentator suggested that reporting standards amounted to "outright bombardment of harassment" targeted at transgender Australians, with unethical reports also being exploited by extreme right-wing groups to mobilize hate against minorities.

=== Reporting on transgender woman accused of violence found to be prejudicial ===
On 7 January 2017 Evie Amati, a transgender woman, attacked customers of a 7-Eleven in Enmore, New South Wales, Sydney with an axe. Four days later, an article written by journalist Tim Blair was published on The Daily Telegraph's website. The article was headlined "Allegedly Axie Evie" and referred to Ms Amati as a "tranny" who had been "chopped herself" and as a "previous he [...] who used to be known as Karl.". The article established no relevance or public interest in the sensational and prominent references to the person's transgender status.

In September 2018, the NSW Civil and Administrative Tribunal considered whether the article constituted unlawful vilification through its "gratuitous references to", and "ridicule of" the woman's transgender status. The Tribunal found that the Daily Telegraph published the article with "apparent disregard for the injurious effect it might have on transgender people". The Tribunal also held that "it is evident that [the journalist] was seeking to make fun of Ms Amati and probably transgender people more generally", and that the "attempt at humour was in poor taste and completely devoid of empathy or sensitivity". The Tribunal also held that the article "contributes to the perpetration and perpetuation of demeaning negative stereotypes and a lack of acceptance of transgender people within the community". The Tribunal ultimately concluded that, whilst "close to the line", the article did not reach the threshold for vilification.

Lawyer Michael Bradley wrote an analysis of the case for political news website Crikey, arguing that the publication of such articles should not be unlawful, but instead that the Daily Telegraph should have sufficient social responsibility to cease publishing the author's "recklessly hurtful attempts at wit – because he did, and does, harm".

As of September 2018, the article has been removed from the website of the Daily Telegraph and replaced with a notice stating "This article is no longer available."

On 18 October 2019, after an investigation spanning 1,011 days, the Australian Press Council concluded that the article breached its Statement of General Principles.

=== Infographic stating youth homosexuality was a sickness found to be prejudicial ===
On 12 July 2017, the Daily Telegraph published an article headlined "Fat Chance Of Being Healthy" in print. The article was syndicated online under the headline "Junk food, alcohol and drugs are fueling health crisis in young adults". The article contained an infographic that canvassed social health concerns, such as alcohol usage, obesity, and drug dependency, for which "Young Aussies have only themselves to blame". The infographic included "same sex attraction" among the condemnable health problems it canvassed.

A number of LGBTI Australians complained that the article was prejudicial, saying that sexual orientation is neither a choice nor a medical problem, and such coverage contributes to prejudice, shame and suicide risk for young same-sex attracted people. The 'blameworthiness' implicit in the headline was alleged to perpetuate negative stereotypes about gay children. The article drew condemnation from the ABC's Media Watch, Sydney radio station 2 DAY FM, Pedestrian TV, and Junkee.

Chris Dore, the publication's Chief Editor, responded to the criticism from the Daily Telegraph's social media accounts, saying the story had been "misinterpreted" and that it "in no way suggests, or intends to suggest, that same-sex relationships are unhealthy. There is no judgement expressed at all in the story other than diet."

The press regulator, the Australian Press Council, was asked to consider whether the article complied with its Statement of General Principles. The Council concluded its investigations five months later. It upheld the complaint, saying "the reference to ill health and blame in the headlines, with the statistic about same-sex attraction displayed among factors such as obesity and drug use, suggested same-sex attraction is unhealthy and blameworthy. As a result, the article caused substantial offence, distress, prejudice and risk to public health and safety, and there was no public interest justifying this."

The Daily Telegraph was further sanctioned by the Australian Press Council for failing to comply with the requirements around publication of adjudication findings. The Press Council required the publisher to republish the print component of the adjudication, as it was not fully compliant with its requirements in the first instance. The reprint was published on 24 January 2018. The Daily Telegraph claimed that "nothing sinister had occurred [in the non-compliance]", and blamed the misdemeanour on a production error.

=== Opinion column containing pejorative term 'faggot' ===
On 2 May 2019, the Daily Telegraph published an article about a US case of a teacher who refused to use the appropriate pronouns for a transgender student. The article prominently incorporated a video with the word 'faggot' appearing twice, once in capitalised letters. The thumbnail for the video also prominently incorporated the word 'faggot'. On 17 September 2019, following an investigation spanning 16 months, the Australian Press Council found in Adjudication #1785 that "the word 'faggot' is most used as a pejorative term to describe gay men". The council also found that the inclusion of the word could reasonably be read as "demeaning and mocking of gay men ... and others with diverse sexual orientation, gender identity, or sex characteristics".

=== Reporting about Australian Defence Force LGBTQ Inclusion Guide found to be misleading ===
The Australian press regulator, the Australian Press Council, concluded on 13 May 2019 that an article published by the Daily Telegraph about an Australian Defence Force "LGBTI Diversity and Inclusion Guide" breached its General Principles because the report was inaccurate and misleading. The report's headline was found to have misled readers into believing that the Australian Defence Force had banned service members from using the terms "he" and "she" out of concern for the sensitivities of gender diverse service members.

=== Interview discussing transgender children that was found to be misleading ===
On 12 June 2019, the Australian Press Council concluded a 14-month investigation into an article and associated podcast published by the Daily Telegraph about transgender children. It concluded that the article breached its General Principles because factual claims about medical efficacy were likely to be misleading. The impugned material concerned an interview in April 2018 between columnist Miranda Devine and Ryan T. Anderson of the conservative American think-tank, The Heritage Foundation. The material substantially focused on medical care for transgender children and adolescents, and claimed that there exists "no evidence that these hormones are safe to be used on kids, no evidence of any reduction in self-harm or suicide".

=== Opinion column on transgender children found to be misleading ===
The Australian Press Council sanctioned a further article by columnist Miranda Devine about Australian transgender children, headlined "What madness can justify mutilating our children?" The piece referred to medical procedures for gender transition as "mutilation", "child surgical abuse" and a "monstrous assault on adolescents' developing bodies".

The Australian Press Council concluded in June 2019 that the article breached its Standards of Practice. It held that the claim of "no evidence that changing sex will reduce the incidence of self-harm or suicide or lessen the impact of other associated mental states" was misleading and expressed in such absolute terms as to be inaccurate.

The ABC's Media Watch criticised the publication for "lack of balance" and for putting religious and political motivations ahead of truth, balanced facts and the public interest in evidence-based medical care.

=== Gratuitous emphasis on LGBTQ status ===
On 11 March 2020, the Daily Telegraph published an article by journalist Toby Vue about a NSW murder victim who was transgender. The article included prominent references to the victim's transgender status in the subheadline and in the body in of the article. The victim's transgender status was irrelevant to the killing. In response to a complaint, the Australian Press Council asked the publisher to comment on whether the references were gratuitous. The Daily Telegraph editorial team, led by Executive Editor Ben English and Managing Editor Greg Thomson, tried to argue that the woman's transgender status was relevant because it "was referred to in court proceedings". The Australian Press Council upheld the complaint on 7 June 2023, saying "The Council notes that the victim's transgender status was only referred to in the sentencing judgment, which was published approximately 12 months after the article was published.... The Council notes that there was no evidence provided that stated or implied that, during the hearing of the matter, the victim's transgender status was raised as a contributing factor to her manslaughter."

On 21 October 2020, the Daily Telegraph published a prominent front-page article about the parole of a convicted serial killer who had undergone a gender transition whilst in custody. The article employed the headlines "Killer's Sex Change Farce", "Fiend's Sex Op on You", and "Serial Killer Wants Medicare Gender Change" in the online version. The article reported the opinion that the provision of medical care to the offender "is disgusting". The offender's gender transition was not a contributing factor to the Court's decision to parole the individual and the article disclosed no public interest the sensational references to the person's personal medical diagnosis and treatment plan. On 28 July 2021, following a nine-month investigation, the Australian Press Council found that the report breached its media ethics standards of practice because "there was no public interest in diminishing the person's request for gender affirming surgery."

On 11 November 2020, the Daily Telegraph published an article about an adult movie performer from an inner Sydney suburb who was the subject of a noise complaint. The article prominently referred to the resident as gay. The article also referred to the suburb where the noise complaint was made as "Sydney's gay heartland". The article included a photograph of the LGBTI Pride flag, and a video from the 2020 Sydney Gay and Lesbian Mardi Gras. There appeared to be no good reason why the publisher singled the individual out for being gay. In November 2021, the Australian Press Council found that the person's sexuality was not a contributing factor in the noise complaints, and the prominent and gratuitous emphasis on the person's sexuality was a breach of the APC's media ethics General Principles.

=== Balance and fairness in reporting ===
On 11 July 2022, the press regulator, the Australian Press Council, found that the Daily Telegraph's coverage of sensitive issues relating to transgender women participating in sport lacked balance and fairness. The adjudication found that the publication sought and obtained quotes from two individuals critical of allowing transgender women to participate in sport, and the article contained further links to numerous other articles highly critical of transgender women participating in sport on equal terms to other athletes. The adjudication noted that the publisher did not seek to cover a range of perspectives and omitted balancing research and evidence that supports the inclusion of transgender women in sport. According, the Australian Press Council found that the Daily Telegraph breached General Principle #3 which requires publishers to provide "balance and fairness" in articles.

== Other controversies ==
=== Coverage of climate change ===
In October 2013, Professor Wendy Bacon from the Australian Centre for Independent Journalism comprehensively studied coverage of climate change and climate science in the Australian press. A 97% consensus of qualified scientists agree that human-induced anthropological climate change is real. However, the study found that the Daily Telegraph is amongst Australia's 'most skeptical' media outlets about climate change, and also the most biased against carbon policy. The study found that Daily Telegraph's coverage of climate science contained almost zero coverage of peer-reviewed science. The study also found that the Daily Telegraph had "very low levels of features about climate change" with coverage of climate change being dominated by opinion writers promoting their own disbelieving attitudes towards climate change. The majority of commentary was written by columnists with no scientific credentials. A broader study of all News Corporation papers found that 45% of all articles "rejected or cast doubt" over climate change, while 65% of commentary "doubted or outright denied" the very existence of climate change.

In 2019, Susan Forde, Journalism Professor at Griffith University in Brisbane, stated that Newscorp publications such as the Daily Telegraph have historically been "very conservative about climate change. In January 2020, a Finance Manager within the company, Emily Townsend, sent a resignation message to all staff saying "I find it unconscionable to continue working for this company, knowing I am contributing to the spread of climate change denial and lies", describing the reporting in the Daily Telegraph as "irresponsible". Professor Forde added "For any journalist who is early on in their career, they'd have to ask themselves whether they really want to belong to an organisation which is not contributing in a positive fashion to the defining debate of our times. It will become harder for [the Daily Telegraph] to get good journalists to work for them, and this will change the culture."

=== Geoffrey Rush defamation ===
On 30 November 2017, the Daily Telegraph published a front-page article, headlined "King Leer", alleging that actor Geoffrey Rush had acted inappropriately towards an actress. during rehearsals for the Sydney Theatre Company's 2015–2016 production of King Lear. The article featured an image of Rush shirtless and in white makeup.

Rush denied the incidents, and said his career had been "irreparably damaged" by the newspaper's untrue reports. It subsequently came to light that the Daily Telegraph did not interview the female actor concerned and provided only a bare few hours for Rush to respond to the serious allegations. Rush filed proceedings on 8 December 2017 in the Federal Court of Australia for defamation against the publisher of the Daily Telegraph, saying the publisher "made false, pejorative and demeaning claims, splattering them with unrelenting bombast on its front pages".

The defamation claim was upheld on 11 April, on the grounds that the Telegraph failed to prove the truth of its allegations. Rush was awarded $850,000, with further damages for the actor's economic losses to be determined later. He said that the female actor was needlessly "dragged into the spotlight by the actions" of the Daily Telegraph. Despite the damaging judgement, the Telegraph stood behind the article's journalist, Jonathon Moran.

=== Failure to verify photograph of deceased man ===
On 3 April 2021, the Daily Telegraph published a prominent photograph of a deceased Australian man whom the publisher alleged had an "obsession" with pornography. The article also alleged that the man had fraudulently claimed a medical battle with cancer. The associated print article by journalist Danielle Gusmaroli carried the words "LIAR" and "DISGRACED" in capitalised case. It subsequently came to light that the paper had not correctly identified the person in the photograph and the facts concerned a different person altogether. The Australian Press Council found on 24 March 2022 that the publication of the article breached its General Principles, saying "...given the seriousness of the reported conduct of the individual named in the article, there was an obligation on the publication to ensure that the photo was in fact that of the person named in the article. Accordingly, the Council considers the publication did not take reasonable steps to verify the photograph, and to ensure that the factual information in the article was accurate. Accordingly, the Council finds that General Principle 1 was breached. The Council considers that given the seriousness of the mistake it would have been preferable for the publication to publish a prominent correction rather than a clarification... The Council considers that given the prominence of the photo and the seriousness of the reported past conduct of the individual named in the article and the failure to verify the accuracy of the photo, the publication failed to take reasonable steps to avoid substantial distress."

=== Tony Zoef defamation ===
On 22 August 2013, the Daily Telegraph published an article headlined "Tailor's alter ego as a gunrunner". The article referred to an individual who was known to Sutherland Shire locals as a "friendly tailor who spends his days altering their clothes". The article claimed that the individual was "alleged" by police to be "the mastermind behind a haul of military-grade weapons smuggled into Australia".

The article mistakenly attributed the alleged crimes to the wrong individual, who subsequently filed a complaint of defamation in the New South Wales District Court. In the first instance, the Court found that, despite the serious errors in the article, the publisher's defence based on a prior offer of amends should prevail.

On appeal, the Supreme Court of NSW upheld the complaint of defamation. It held that, "Taking into account the seriousness of the defamatory imputations and the significant hurt they caused the appellant, the damage to his business as a tailor, the unequal prominence the respondent afforded to the proposed correction and apology and their resultant inadequacy, the modest monetary component of the offer, and the likelihood of the proceedings being successful, the offer of amends was not reasonable." The Court awarded a sum of $150,000 to the complainant.

=== John Brogden allegations ===
The Telegraph was widely criticised for its coverage of former New South Wales Liberal leader John Brogden. After Brogden resigned in 2005, the newspaper ran a front-page headline, "Brogden's Sordid Past: Disgraced Liberal leader damned by secret shame file", detailing past allegations of misconduct by Brogden. The following day, Brogden attempted suicide at his electoral office.

Rodney Tiffen, an academic at the University of Sydney, described the newspaper's coverage as an example of "hyena journalism", judging Brogden's personal life to be off limits following his withdrawal from public life.

Editor David Penberthy claimed that his source was from inside the Liberal Party and that none of the events would have happened if no one leaked from inside the party.

=== Mount Druitt High School ===
On 8 January 1997, the Telegraph published the headline "The class we failed" concerning the Year 12 class at Mount Druitt High School in outer Western Sydney in which no student scored a Tertiary Entrance Rank (TER) above 50 (the maximum possible rank is 99.95). Although the article made clear that the newspaper believed that the state had failed the students, many accused the Telegraph of branding the students themselves as failures and showing a full year photo identifying students.

The story led to a renewed focus on the quality of public schools in Western Sydney and precipitated several reviews of schooling in the area. But for many, the headline highlighted problems with interpreting Higher School Certificate results and the accompanying TER.

The students successfully sued the newspaper in the Supreme Court for defamation. The Telegraph subsequently apologised and settled for damages out of court. The published apology stated:

In that story The Daily Telegraph suggested, among other things, that the students in the class of 1996 failed their HSC. This is wrong and The Daily Telegraph withdraws any such suggestion. The Daily Telegraph also withdraws any suggestion that those students acted without discipline or commitment in their HSC studies. The students in the HSC class of 1996 successfully completed their HSC and contrary to the suggestions in the original article many of those students performed very well scoring high marks in the HSC. The Daily Telegraph apologises to each student in the class of 1996 at Mt Druitt. It also apologises to their parents and friends for all the hurt, harm and suffering it has caused them.

Later, criticising defamation laws, News Limited CEO John Hartigan said:

The words in the story pointed to deep-seated problems within the education system, but a barrister convinced the jury that, regardless of the words before him, what we really meant to say was that the entire class was too stupid to pass the HSC.

=== Call centres in India ===
In October 2006, The Telegraph claimed in a front-page article that Australia and New Zealand Banking Group were using call centres in Bangalore, India. The paper even sent a journalist to Bangalore, Luke McIlveen, and a photographer to verify this claim. ANZ denied the claim, stating that they do not employ overseas call centre staff in India. Subsequently, ANZ pulled all of its advertising from News Limited, including Foxtel and News website, which amounted to $4–5 million, about 10% of ANZ's advertising budget.

In assuming blame, David Penberthy, editor-in-chief of News Limited, defended McIlveen.

=== Press Council complaint regarding Greens article ===
In May 2011, The Telegraph published an article making an assertion about the Australian Greens which subsequently prompted a complaint to the Australian Press Council. The article asserted that the Greens had managed to "force" the Government to divert money from flood relief, to fund various Green programs. The Press Council upheld the complaint and stated that the assertion was inaccurate and remained uncorrected.

=== Press Council complaint regarding series of misleading NBN articles ===
In June and July 2011, The Telegraph published a series of articles about the National Broadband Network. These articles triggered a complaint to the Australian Press Council, alleging that they were factually incorrect, unbalanced and misleading. In December 2011, the Press Council upheld the complaints on all three articles, forcing the Telegraph to publish the adjudication. The council also published the following statement in regards to the issue:

The Council expressed concern that within a short period of time three articles on the same theme contained inaccurate or misleading assertions. It considers that this sequence of errors should not have occurred and that they should have been corrected promptly and adequately when brought to the newspaper's attention.

=== Press Council complaint regarding asylum seeker article ===
In November 2011, The Telegraph published an article about asylum seekers with the front-page heading "OPEN THE FLOODGATES – Exclusive: Thousands of boat people to invade NSW". Another headline stated "Detainee Deluge for Sydney". This prompted a complaint to the Australian Press Council, which was upheld. The Press Council published the following statement (extract only):

The Press Council has concluded that use of the word "invade" was gravely inaccurate, unfair and offensive because of its clear connotations of forceful occupation. Accordingly, the complaint is upheld on this ground for what the Council regards as an especially serious breach of its principles. The Council has concluded that use of the words "open the floodgates" and "deluge" were inaccurate and unfair. Even the intake levels claimed in the article could not reasonably be described as having such an extreme impact on suburban Sydney, and nothing quoted from the briefing note asserted government fears of inability to cope.

=== Press Council complaint regarding series of Clover Moore articles ===
Throughout 2011, The Telegraph published 17 articles about Sydney Lord Mayor and MP Clover Moore. The articles prompted a complaint to the Australian Press Council. The complainant argued that the articles provided unbalanced coverage and that many of the headlines and phrases were opinion rather than fact. The Press Council upheld the complaint in part and published the following statement (extract only):

The Council has concluded that the headlines mentioned above breached [the Council's] principles because they expressed the newspaper's opinions rather than being a summary of facts reported in the accompanying news story. The inclusion in a news story of words such as "crazy council policies", "junket" and "diva-like list of demands" which were not attributed to any sources also failed to separate fact from opinion. Accordingly, the complaint is upheld on these grounds.

This adjudication marked the fourth complaint to have been upheld against The Daily Telegraph under the editorship of Paul Whittaker, since commencing the role in April 2011.

=== Photoshopping of Mike Carlton onto Boston bombing victim ===
Following the resignation of Fairfax commentator Mike Carlton, The Daily Telegraph published a 2-page spread attacking Carlton and competing newspaper the Sydney Morning Herald. The spread included a composited image of Boston Marathon bombing victim James Costello, with Mr Carlton's face and wearing an Arab headdress. The photoshopped image portrayed Carlton "escaping Gaza". The image manipulation drew widespread criticism on social media, and forced the editor to apologise, saying he was unaware of the origin of the image.

=== Cairo Takeaway Sydney Undercover "Sting" ===
Leaked documents revealed the Telegraph had hatched a premeditated plan to tail a man, who is Jewish, as he went "undercover" to "see what it's like being Jewish" in a string of multicultural Sydney suburbs, covertly filming his interactions via his sunglasses.

The man is a prominent member of Sydney's Jewish community, who appeared to be accompanied by senior Daily Telegraph journalist Danielle Gusmaroli and a photographer to the Cairo Takeaway, a popular Egyptian restaurant on Enmore Road in Newtown, on Tuesday.

This man, wearing a Star of David hat, went into Cairo Cafe in hopes of an anti-semitic interaction. Instead, he received prompt service for a hibiscus tea, help with the lid when it looked like he was struggling and also interacted with another staff member after exiting the cafe, advising that they hope he likes his tea. A journalist and cameraman were waiting in the wings to catch Cairo Cafe out, and instead were caught out on their own by trying to frame local businesses as anti-Semitic.

News Corp publication the Daily Telegraph says an apparent undercover stunt "could have been better handled" after it led to an altercation in a Sydney cafe. No official public apology has been recorded. The Daily Telegraph has not released any article to date and is actively disabling comments on its social media or ignoring comments altogether.
