= Wendy Aylsworth =

American technology executive

- Born: Detroit, Michigan
- Education: University of Michigan, Ann Arbor (BSCE), University of Southern California (MS/MBA)
- Employer(s): Lockheed, Honeywell, The Walt Disney Company, Warner Bros., Walden Pond

Wendy Aylsworth is a technology executive best known for her work in the television and motion picture industry. She has held positions at Walt Disney Imagineering, Walt Disney Feature Animation, and Warner Bros. and has filled roles at the Digital Cinema Initiative, the Society of Motion Picture and Television Engineers (SMPTE), and the Science and Technology Council of the Academy of Motion Picture Arts and Sciences.

== Early life and education ==
Aylsworth was born in Detroit, Michigan and attended the University of Michigan, Ann Arbor, where she received her BSCE. She also "holds an MS/MBA (Beta Gamma Sigma) in Managerial Sciences/Strategic Planning from the University of Southern California."

== Career ==
Her early career was spent in the defense industry, developing computer systems at Lockheed and managing software development at Honeywell.

In 1989, she moved to Walt Disney Imagineering, managing software development for theme park rides. The following year she moved to Walt Disney Feature Animation as Director of Engineering, coming aboard as Disney was making the transition to digital production, using CAPS to produce The Rescuers Down Under.

In 1994, she moved to Warner Bros. as director of technology in the feature animation division." Five years later, she became vice president, Technology for Warner Bros. In 2008, she was promoted to Senior Vice President, Warner Bros. Technical Operations.

She was a leader of the Digital Cinema Initiative, including being chair of SMPTE's D-Cinema Technology Committee. She also led the effort to upgrade theaters to use High Frame Rate technology in preparation to show Peter Jackson's The Hobbit: An Unexpected Journey.

In 2012, Aylsworth was named President of the Society of Motion Picture and Television Engineers (SMPTE). She was the first woman to hold that position. She is a Lifetime Fellow of that organization. In 2013, she was invited to join the Science and Technology Council of the Academy of Motion Picture Arts and Sciences, having become a member in 2012.

As of 2016, Aylsworth is the CEO of Walden Pond, which provides technology consulting.

== Recognition & awards ==
In 2013, Aylsworth served her second term on the Board of Governors of the Television Academy.

In 2016, Aylsworth received the Bob Lambert Technology Leadership Award from the Entertainment Technology Center at the University of Southern California. Aylsworth had worked with Lambert during her time at Disney.

In 2018, Aylsworth was awarded The Charles F. Jenkins Lifetime Achievement Award by the Academy of Television Arts & Sciences.
