= Beverly Wood =

American film chemist

Beverly Wood is a film chemist from Chase City, Virginia. Wood worked as a post production editor and a designer of the two film processing technologies: Color Contrasting Enhancement (CCE) and Adjustable Contrast Enhancement (ACE). These technological innovations of film Wood contributed to are seen in modern film production to this day.

== Early life and education ==
Wood was born in 1956 in Chase City, Virginia, the child of Arnold Garrett Wood and Lillian Wood. Her father was the first African-American bank teller in Chase City. Motivated by her family, Wood pursued education throughout her youth and early adulthood. She attended the University of Mary Washington for three years as an undergraduate, then spent one year at the University of Virginia, before attending the University of Georgia, graduating with a masters in Chemistry.

== Career ==
Wood worked several summer jobs at various companies while at school, such as Phil Morris and DuPont. Eventually, after leaving the University of Georgia, Wood worked at Kodak as the head of film restoration in their R&D department, utilizing her research from University of Georgia as a graduate, to work on Gas Chromatography. Wood then move jobs, working under MGM as the director of engineering their film lab Metrocolor. After the Metrocolor lab under MGM was closed, Wood moved to Los Angeles to work under Deluxe Laboratories as a post-production film editor using chemical processes to add a visual color change to it.

Wood had worked on the film Seven, which would give her notoriety of her work, Wood even working directly with some directors on the post production, such as Quentin Tarantino, Ron Howard and the Coen brothers. Wood continued working with Deluxe Laboratories, eventually being appointed as the vice president of technical services. Wood’s work at Deluxe would culminate in her contributing to the technologies of Color Contrasting Enhancement (CCE) and Adjustable Contrast Enhancement (ACE) on film. The two technologies opened a new means for visual film media to be processed and expressed. The techniques derived from these new technologies are seen being utilized in movies such as Seven, O Brother, Where Art Thou?, and Skyfall. Wood's work as a post production editor garnered her the Natalie M. and Herbert T. Kalmus Medal from the Society of Motion Picture and Television Engineers in 2020, an award dedicated to those making scientific contributions to filmmaking.

== Theater restoration project (2016-2017) ==
Around the years 2016-2017, Wood would start a project of restoring a local theater, the “Mecca Movie House” a historic landmark for the town, in her hometown of Chase City, Virginia, that had been since abandoned. Wood’s aim was to convert the rundown theater into a local community center that focused primarily on teaching the history and processes of filmmaking to the community. The renovation was funded by both donations as well various grants provided to the SOH from other types of preservation organizations.

== Achievements and awards ==
- Beverly Wood has been recognized for her notable work in the film industry doing her part to develop color contrast enhancement as well as adjustable contrast enhancement it was her work and development in these fields that earned her at the Techno-Color Natalie M and Herbert T. Klamus Medal in 2020.
