= Roger Barton (film editor) =

American film editor

- Born: July 1, 1966 (age 59); Los Angeles, California, U.S.
- Occupation: Film editor
- Years active: 1993–present
- Spouse: Jackie Volker (m. 2022)
- Children: Aidan Barton

Roger Barton (born July 1, 1966, in Los Angeles) is an American film editor. He has worked on dozens of Hollywood films, including Titanic, Armageddon, Pirates of the Caribbean: Dead Men Tell No Tales, Star Wars: Episode III – Revenge of the Sith, and the Transformers film series.

== Career ==
Barton is particularly known for his work on large-budget action films, such as Pearl Harbor, World War Z, A Quiet Place, and the Transformers film series. Additionally, Barton is the Co-Founder of Evercast, a secure remote collaboration platform. During the COVID-19 pandemic, when Hollywood was shut down, Evercast became an indispensable tool for filmmakers; enabling them to continue working remotely. This innovation helped Evercast win a 2020 Engineering Emmy.

In 2019, Walt Disney Pictures invited Roger to join their creative team. Since then, he has temporarily paused his freelance career to lend his experience to their feature film department.

In August of 2022, Roger married Jackie Volker, uniting together her six children and his son Aidan, who played both Luke Skywalker and Princess Leia as infants in the motion picture Star Wars: Episode III – Revenge of the Sith.

Currently, Roger works as an Editorial Creative Consultant for Walt Disney Pictures and is in the process of finishing a script about Medal of Honor recipient, William J. Crawford.

== Filmography ==
Year	Film	Director	Notes
1995	Rough Magic	Clare Peploe	Assistant Editor
1996	Alaska	Fraser Clarke Heston	First Assistant Editor
1997	Titanic	James Cameron	Associate Editor
1997	That Darn Cat	Bob Spiers	
1998	Armageddon	Michael Bay	Associate Editor
1999	Detroit Rock City	Adam Rifkin	Additional Editor
2000	Gone in 60 Seconds	Dominic Sena	
2001	Pearl Harbor	Michael Bay	
2002	Ghost Ship	Steve Beck	
2003	Bad Boys II	Michael Bay	
2005	The Island	Michael Bay	Additional Editor
2005	The Amityville Horror	Andrew Douglas	
2005	Star Wars: Episode III – Revenge of the Sith	George Lucas	Barton's son, Aidan, portrayed Luke Skywalker and Leia Organa as infants
2005	Get Rich or Die Tryin'	Jim Sheridan	
2006	Eragon	Stefen Fangmeier	
2007	The Seeker	David L. Cunningham	Additional Editor
2008	Speed Racer	The Wachowskis	
2009	Transformers: Revenge of the Fallen	Michael Bay	
2010	The A-Team	Joe Carnahan	
2011	Transformers: Dark of the Moon	Michael Bay	
2011	The Grey	Joe Carnahan	
2013	G.I. Joe: Retaliation	Jon M. Chu	
2013	World War Z	Marc Forster	
2014	Transformers: Age of Extinction	Michael Bay	
2015	Terminator Genisys	Alan Taylor	
2017	Pirates of the Caribbean: Dead Men Tell No Tales	Joachim Rønning; Espen Sandberg	
2017	Transformers: The Last Knight	Michael Bay	
2018	A Quiet Place	John Krasinski	Additional Editor
2019	Godzilla: King of the Monsters	Michael Dougherty	
2019	6 Underground	Michael Bay	
2021	The Tomorrow War	Chris McKay	
