= Ira Tiffen =

- Born: Ira Alan Tiffen; December 24, 1951 (age 74); Brooklyn, New York, U.S.
- Occupations: Optics Designer and Manufacturer
- Known for: Work with camera filters
- Website: iratiffen.com

Ira Alan Tiffen (born December 24, 1951) is an American optics designer and glass artist who worked at the Tiffen Company from 1973 to 2004. He has been the recipient of both an Academy Award and an Emmy Award for his technical achievements in motion picture photography and video imaging.

== Early life ==
Ira Tiffen was born in Brooklyn, New York, to Nathan and Helen Tiffen. His father was born February 19, 1925, and his mother was born April 13, 1929. He started his career at 19 years of age working at Tiffen on his vacation time, making filters in the lab. When he graduated from New York University with a bachelor's degree in chemical engineering in 1973, he began his full-time job at Tiffen managing the department for laminating filter glass.

== Later career ==
Ira Tiffen worked in various departments of Tiffen, specializing in manufacturing and product development, and eventually became the vice president of research and development in the late 1980s. He would later go on to receive an honorary doctorate from Columbia College. He left Tiffen in 2004, and in 2007 began making glass art as a glass artist. In 2012 he took on the position of Vice President of Motion Picture Filters at Schneider Kreuznach. In 2015, he was interviewed by the RocketJump Film School.

== Awards ==
In 1993, Tiffen was awarded with the Academy Award for Technical Achievement for the production of the Ultra Contrast Filter Series.

In 1998, Tiffen, along with his father and brother, were presented the Emmy Engineering Award for their contributions to the design and manufacturing of camera lens filters. More specifically, the award was for the Tiffen laminating process, which involves fusing together two layers of clear glass using a micro-thin bonding layer, which the award description says "provided the basis for an unprecedented level of color, contrast, resolution, and flare control".

Since 1988, he has been the author of a Camera Filters section in the American Cinematographer Manual. Tiffen has been an Associate Member of the American Society of Cinematographers (ASC) since 1992, and a Fellow of the Society of Motion Picture and Television Engineers (SMPTE) since 2002.
