= Color correction =

Process used in stage lighting, photography, and television

Color correction is a process used in stage lighting, photography, television, cinematography, and other disciplines, which uses color gels, or filters, to alter the overall color of the light. Typically the light color is measured on a scale known as color temperature, as well as along a green–magenta axis orthogonal to the color temperature axis.

Without color-correction gels, a scene may have a mix of various colors. Applying color-correction gels in front of light sources can alter the color of the various light sources to match. Mixed lighting can produce an undesirable aesthetic when displayed on a television or in a theatre.

Conversely, gels may also be used to make a scene appear more natural by simulating the mix of color temperatures that occur naturally. This application is useful, especially where motivated lighting (lending the impression that it is diegetic) is the goal. Color gels may also be used to tint lights for artistic effect.

== Correlated color temperature ==
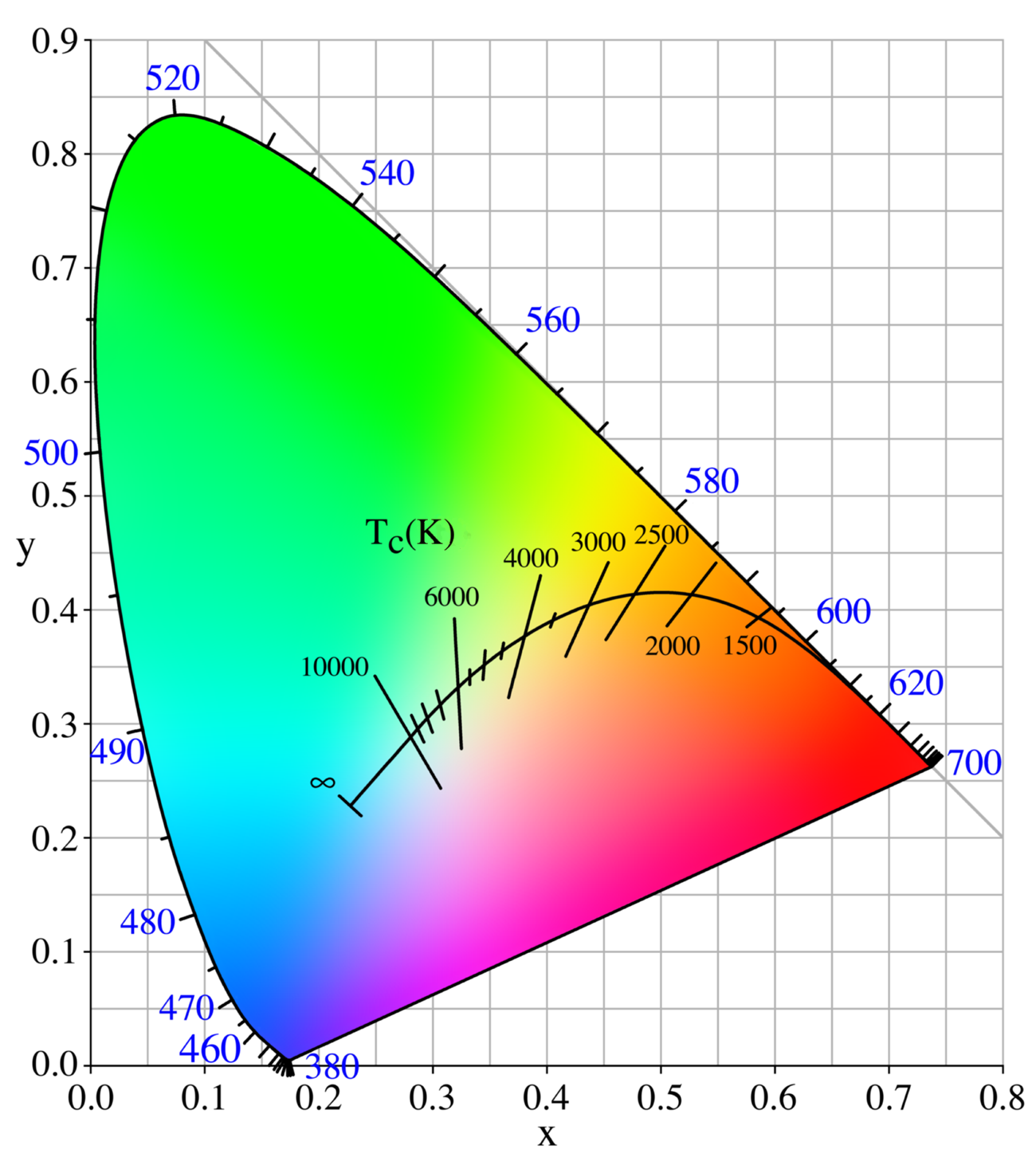
Chromaticity diagram, Planckian locus, and lines of constant CCT

The particular color of a white light source can be simplified into a correlated color temperature (CCT). The higher the CCT, the bluer the light appears. Sunlight at 5600 K, for example, appears much bluer than tungsten light at 3200 K. Unlike a chromaticity diagram, the Kelvin scale reduces the light source's color into one dimension. Thus, light sources of the same CCT may appear green or magenta in comparison with one another. Fluorescent lights, for example, are typically very green in comparison with other types of lighting. However, some fluorescent lamps are designed to have a high faithfulness to an ideal light, as measured by its color rendering index (CRI). This dimension, along lines of constant CCT, is sometimes measured in terms of green–magenta balance; this dimension is sometimes referred to as "tint" or "CC".

== Gel nomenclature ==
The main color-correction gels are "color temperature blue" (CTB) and "color temperature orange" (CTO). A CTB gel converts tungsten light to "daylight" color. A CTO gel performs the reverse. Note that different manufacturers' gels yield slightly different colors. As well, there is no precise definition of the color of daylight since it varies depending on the location (latitude, dust, pollution) and the time of day.

Gels that remove the green cast of fluorescent lights are called "minus green". Gels that add a green cast are called "plus green". Fractions such as 3/4, 1/2, 1/4, and 1/8 indicate the strength of a gel. A 1/2 CTO gel is half the strength of a (full) CTO gel.

== Process ==
Color correction is a technical process that fixes color issues and makes footage appear as naturalistic as possible. The idea is for colors to look clean and real, as human eyes would see them in the real world – basically, correcting problems of the underlying image by balancing out the colors, making the whites appear white, the blacks appear black, and making sure that everything is even.

This process is usually used in stage lighting, photography, television, cinematography, and other disciplines.

== White-balancing cameras ==
Color filters may be applied over a camera lens to adjust its white balance. In video systems, white balance can be achieved by digital or electronic manipulation of the signal and hence color-correction filters are not entirely necessary. However, some digital cinema cameras can record an image without any digital filtering applied; using physical color-correction filters to white balance (instead of digital or electronic manipulation) can maximize the dynamic range of the captured image.

Some professional cameras designed for electronic news gathering use filter wheels containing color-correction filters and are designed to optimize performance for different color temperatures.

In film cameras, no electronic or digital manipulation of white balance is possible in the original camera negative. Color-correction filters are an effective method of adjusting white balance. Without filtering, one must attempt to fix white balance through color timing or by manipulating the film after it has been scanned or telecined.

== Color correction in software ==
Software applications such as Adobe Photoshop allow the user to correct colors to achieve the desired results in an image. Multiple tools available to correct colors, match colors, or change colors of images or of parts of images.
