= Cospective =

Australian software company concerned with filmmaking

Cospective Pty Ltd
- Company type: Private company
- Industry: Film industry Post-production; Video production
- Founded: 2000
- Headquarters: Glenside, Adelaide, South Australia
- Key people: Rory McGregor – CEO; Neil Wilson – CTO; Rolly Empson – QA & Support
- Products: cineSpace cineSync; Frankie
- Website: www.cospective.com

Cospective Pty Ltd, formerly Rising Sun Research, is an Australian software firm located in Adelaide, South Australia. It is the Australian arm of the international ftrack organisation.

The company originated as a technology spin-off from the Adelaide-based visual effects company Rising Sun Pictures in 2000, changing its name in 2012 and moving to its current location at the inner-city suburb of Glenside in January 2013, as part of the Adelaide Studios precinct.

Products developed by Cospective include cineSpace, a film colour management solution, cineSync, a tool for remote visual collaboration, and Frankie, a real-time video review platform for short form content production. cineSpace was acquired by Cine-tal Systems in August 2008 and then subsequently acquired by THX Ltd in April 2011.

Tony Clark (founder and as of June 2022 still in charge of Rising Sun Pictures), Alan Rogers, Neil Wilson and Rory McGregor were instrumental in creating cineSync, for which they were presented with a Technical Achievement Award by the Academy of Motion Picture Arts and Sciences (AMPAS) for the 2010 Scientific and Technical Achievement Awards. The Academy's Scientific and Technical Awards honour the men, women and companies whose discoveries and innovations have contributed in significant, outstanding and lasting ways to motion pictures.

As of June 2022 the company's focus is on continuing to develop cineSync and Frankie. It is the Australian arm of the international ftrack organisation.
