= FabFilter =

Developer of audio plugin software

FabFilter B.V.
- Industry: Software
- Founded: 2002
- Founders: Floris Klinkert; Frederik Slijkerman
- Headquarters: Amsterdam, Netherlands
- Products: Audio plug-ins
- Website: FabFilter.com

FabFilter B.V. is a Dutch developer of audio software plug-ins. Their plug-ins have been described as "something of an industry standard" by Sound on Sound magazine. The company won an Engineering Emmy for its equalizer plug-in Pro-Q 3 in 2019.

== History ==
Frederik Slijkerman and Floris Klinkert founded FabFilter in 2002. Their first product was FabFilter One, a synthesizer; the company initially focused on creative plug-ins that create or manipulate sound such as synthesizers, filters and delays.

In 2007, the company began launching a range of mixing and mastering plug-ins, starting with Pro-C, a compressor.

=== Twin ===
In 2005, FabFilter released the synthesizer plug-in Twin. The company subsequently released Twin 2 in 2009 and Twin 3 in 2023. In a review of Twin 3, Sound on Sound magazine asserted that FabFilter plug-ins had "become something of an industry standard among mix engineers. It’s a rare Inside Track column in this magazine that doesn’t feature their Pro‑Q equaliser, Pro‑MB multiband dynamics or Pro‑C compressor".

A preset from Twin was reported to be the inspiration for the name of Billie Eilish's 2024 album Hit Me Hard and Soft; MusicRadar speculated that said preset was used on the album's track "Bittersuite".

=== Pro-Q ===
In 2009, FabFilter released Pro-Q, an equalizer plug-in. Pro-Q 2, 3, and 4 were released 2014, 2018, and 2024 respectively.

In 2019, Pro-Q 3 was given an Engineering Emmy Award by the Television Academy. In an interview for Sound on Sound about his work on St. Vincent's 2021 album Daddy's Home, recording engineer Cian Riordan described it as "such a powerful plug‑in, just leagues above everything else".

Recording magazine said in a review of Pro-Q 3 that "FabFilter is widely known for creating some of the best plug-ins on the market", adding that it "stands out in a sea of hardware modeling and emulation plug-ins because it doesn't attempt to emulate the design, operation or sound of a hardware EQ."

In 2025, Sound on Sound compared the impact of Pro-Q to that of the Minimoog, Yamaha DX7, and SSL console, noting that "back in 2011... the large majority of plug‑in equalisers retained many [analog] design conventions... Pro‑Q wriggled free of this straitjacket, reimagining the plug‑in equaliser using the principles of good software interface design instead of preconceptions inherited from hardware." Tape Op magazine made a similar point, saying Pro-Q "has become one of the most used, if not the most used, EQ plug-ins for professionals and enthusiasts alike."

== Products ==
FabFilter has released its products in VST, AU, AAX and VST3 formats for PC and Mac, and for iOS.

The range of software is listed below.

| Software | Function | Release date | Notes |
|---|---|---|---|
| One | Synthesizer | 2004 | |
| Volcano | Filter | 2005 | Updated to Volcano 2 in 2008 and Volcano 3 in 2021 |
| Twin | Synthesizer | 2005 | Updated to Twin 2 in 2009 and Twin 3 in 2023 |
| Timeless | Delay | 2006 | Updated to Timeless 2 in 2009 and Timeless 3 in 2021 |
| Simplon | Synthesizer | 2007 | |
| Pro-C | Compressor | 2007 | Updated to Pro-C 2 in 2015, and Pro-C 3 in 2026 |
| Pro-Q | Equalizer | 2009 | Updated to Pro-Q 2 in 2014, Pro-Q 3 in 2018, and Pro-Q 4 in 2024 |
| Micro | Filter | 2010 | |
| Pro-L | Limiter | 2010 | Updated to Pro-L 2 in 2017 |
| Pro-G | Gate/Expander | 2011 | |
| Saturn | Distortion | 2012 | Updated to Saturn 2 in 2020 |
| Pro-DS | De-esser | 2012 | |
| Pro-MB | Multiband compressor | 2013 | |
| Pro-R | Reverb | 2016 | Updated to Pro-R 2 in 2023 |
