= Color gel =

Material used to color light or correct color

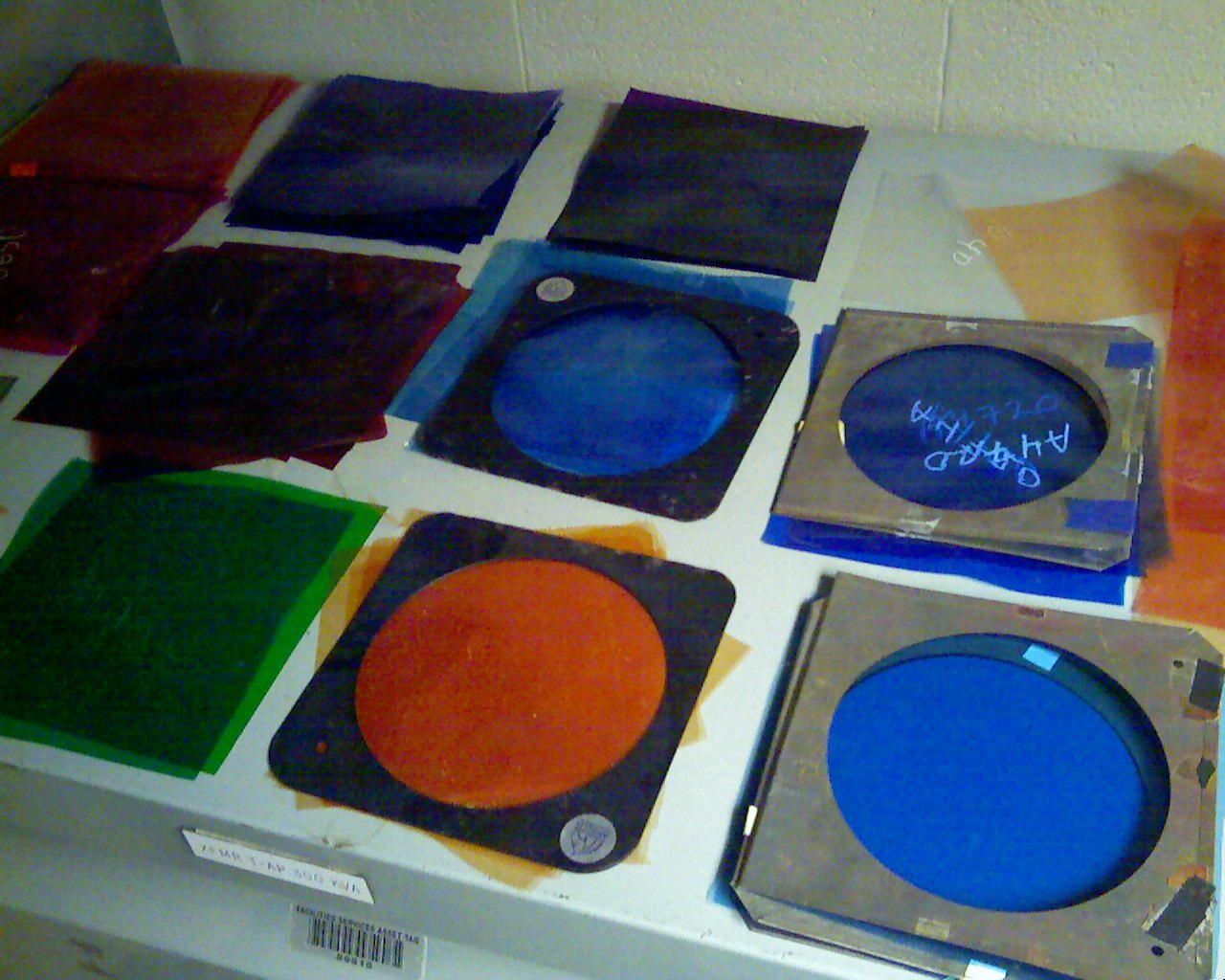
Many color gels organized, some in gel heads

A color gel or color filter (Commonwealth spelling: colour gel or colour filter), also known as lighting gel or simply gel, is a transparent colored material that is used in theater, event production, photography, videography and cinematography to color light and for color correction. Modern gels are thin sheets of polycarbonate, polyester or other heat-resistant plastics, placed in front of a lighting fixture in the path of the beam.

Gels have a limited life, especially in saturated colors (lower light transmission) and shorter wavelength (blues). The color will fade or even melt, depending upon the energy absorption of the color, and the sheet will have to be replaced.

In permanent installations and some theatrical uses, colored glass filters or dichroic filters are used. The main drawbacks are additional expense and a more limited selection.

== History ==
In Shakespearean-era theater, red wine was used in a glass container as a light filter. In later days, colored water or silk was used to filter light in the theater. Later, a gelatin base became the material of choice. Gelatin gel was available at least until 1979. The name gel has continued to be used to the present day. Gelatin-based color media had no melting point, and the color was cast in the media as opposed to being coated on the surface. It would, however, char at high temperatures and become brittle once heated, so that it could not be handled once used in the lighting instrument.

By 1945, more heat-tolerant and self-extinguishing acetate-based through-dyed materials were being manufactured (marketed as Chromoid then Cinemoid by Strand Electric). In the U.S., Roscolene (acetate) was developed to deal with higher output light sources. Though cheaper, the acetate filters eventually fell out of favor with professional organizations since they could not withstand the higher temperatures produced by the tungsten halogen lamps that came into widespread use in the late 1960s.

The acetate-based material was replaced by polycarbonates like Roscolar (mylar polycarbonate) and polyester-based filters. These materials have superior heat tolerance. Polyester having the highest melting point of 480 °F (249 °C).

Often a surface coating was applied on a transparent film. The first dyed polyester gels were introduced by Berkey Colortran in 1969 as Gelatran, the original deep-dyed polyester. The Gelatran process is still used today to produce GAMColor (100% of the line) and Roscolux (about 30% of the line). Other color manufacturers, such as Lee Filters and Apollo Design Technology, use a surface applied dye. (Roscolux is 70% polycarbonate and 30% deep-dyed polyester.)

Almost every color manufacturer today uses either polycarbonate or polyester to manufacture their gels. Even today's gels can burn out (to lighten in color starting in the center) easily, rendering them useless. As instrument design improves, it has become a selling point on many lights to have as little heat radiating from the front of the fixture as possible to prevent burn-through, and keep stage equipment and actors cooler.

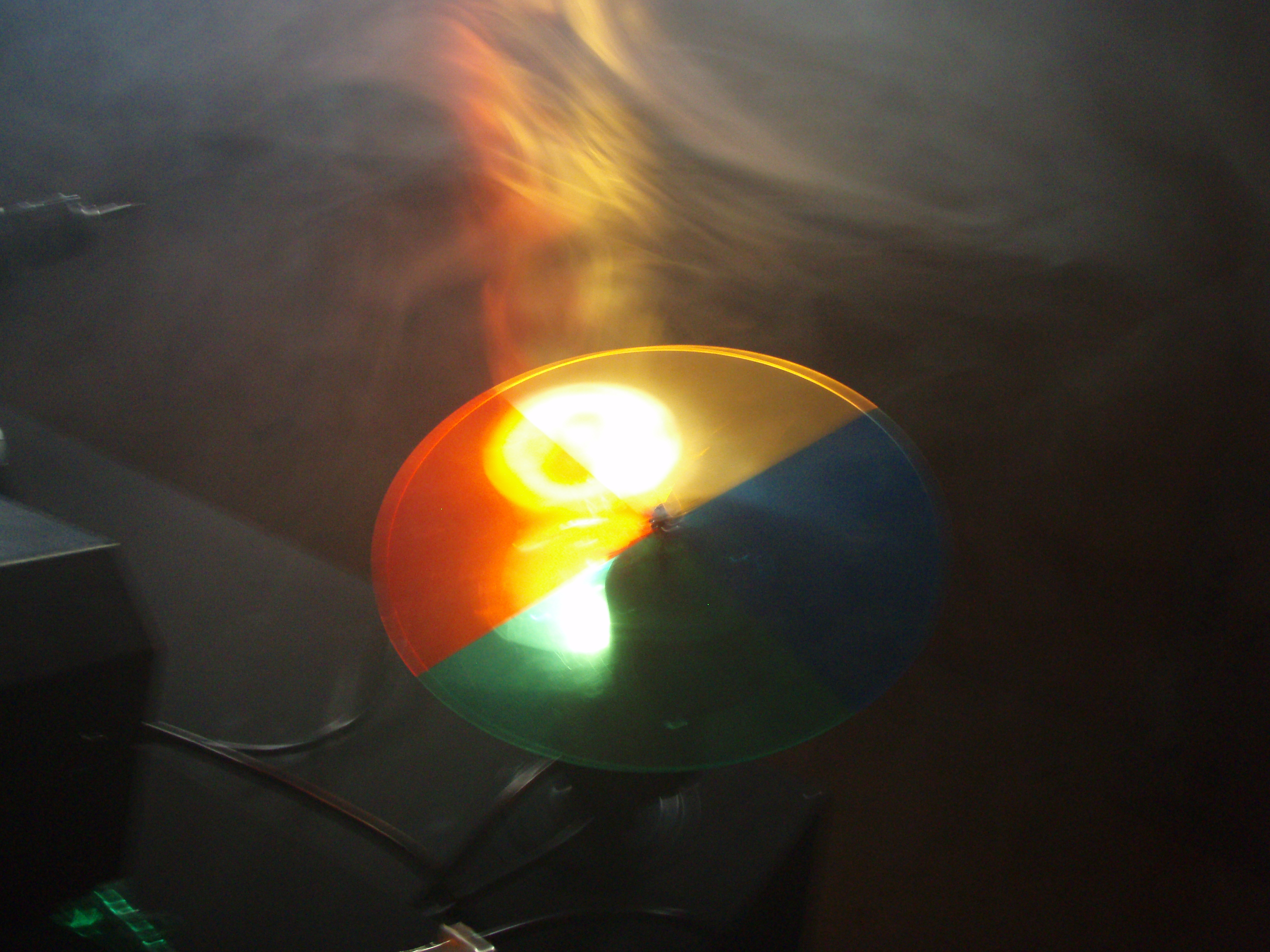
A motorized color gel

In the 1930s, Strand Electric of London provided the first numbering system for their swatches and with their agents in New York and Sydney, the numbering system went round the world. Remnants of this original filter color system exist in the color swatches of today (such as Deep Amber = No. 3; Primary Red = No. 6; Middle Rose = No. 10; Peacock Blue = No. 15; Primary Blue = No. 20; Primary Green = No. 39).

In the theater, gels are typically available in single 20 in × 24 in (500 mm × 600 mm) sheets, which are then cut down to the appropriate size before use. The size originates from the gelatin days: it is the same as a standard baker's sheet, which was used to cast the sheets. In the film industry, gels are usually cut straight from rolls 24 or 48 in (600 or 1,200 mm) wide and 50 ft (15 m) long, as the size required may vary from a single practical halogen spotlight in a ceiling to a whole window.

== Colors ==
Similar colors may vary between different companies' formulations. For example, many have a color named "Bastard Amber", but the transmitted color spectrum may be different. For this reason it is often misleading to refer to gel colors by name. Even a familiar color name, like Steel Blue, transmits widely differing colored light in each manufacturer's line.

By necessity, color gels are selected by specifying the manufacturer, line, color number, and name: Rosco Cinegel #3202 Full Blue CTB.

Apollo Design Technology uses a four digit number based on the visible spectrum to designate and locate specific color transmissions.

The GAMColor line from Rosco employs a three digit numbering system, organized by the wavelength of the principle color in the family, i.e.: Blues in the 800's with primary blue at 850 (though the manufacturer's numbers do not relate directly to any wavelength, transmission, or frequency). The same applies to Greens in the 600's, Reds in the 200's, etc.

Rosco's Roscolux line is currently the oldest major line of color media, . They started using only a two-digit numbering system, listing colors in no particular order. As the range demanded by designers increased and many more colors were offered in the 1970's and 1980's, two digits quickly proved inadequate. As a result the original scheme was overlaid by three-digit and eventually four-digit numbers in between the original two-digit colors in the line.

Manufacturers produce swatch books, which contain a small sample of each color, along with the color name and manufacturer's catalogue number. Many manufacturers also provide spectral analysis for each color and transmission values, expressed as a percentage of light allowed to pass through the filter from the light source. Swatch books enable designers and technicians to have a true representation of the manufacturers' range of colors.

Many designers choose a limited color palette for generic applications because it is financially and logistically difficult to have access to all colors for a single show.

Color correction gels absorb light of some wavelengths more than others. This Rosco gel has a low transmittance at long wavelengths.

There are also gels for color correction, such as CTB (color temperature blue) and CTO (color temperature orange). Color correction gels alter or correct the color temperature of a light to more closely match the color temperature of a film negative or the white balance of a digital imager. Specifically CTB, which is blue in appearance, will correct tungsten lights that typically have a color temperature in the range of 3,200 to 5,700 kelvins to more closely match the color temperature of "daylight" negative, which is usually around 5,400 K (nominal daylight). CTO, which is orange in appearance, will correct a "daylight"-balanced light source (such as many common HMI bulbs) to match the color temperature of tungsten negative, which is typically 3,200 K. There are "half" and "quarter" variations of the common color correction gels. It is common to use color correction gels for artistic purposes and not just for negative-to-lightsource correction.

Most ranges of gels also include non-colored media, such as a variety of diffusion and directional "silk" materials to produce special lighting effects. "Opal" for example is an opalescent or translucent diffusion filter.

It is common for a gel manufacturer to publish the transmission coefficient or even the spectral transmittance curve in the swatch book and catalogs. A low transmittance gel will produce relatively little light on stage, but will cast a much more vivid color than a high transmission gel, because the colorfulness of a light source is directly related to narrowness of its spectral linewidth. Conversely, the flatter its curve becomes, the closer the gel is to a neutral density filter.

== See also ==
- Photographic filter
- Wratten number
