= LaserPacific =

- Formerly: Laser Pacific Media Corporation
- Type: Public (1990–2003); Subsidiary (2003–2011)
- Industry: Post-production
- Predecessor: Pacific Video Industries; Spectra Image; Laser Edit, Inc.
- Founded: 1990
- Founder: Emory Cohen; Gregory L. Biller
- Defunct: 2011
- Fate: Acquired by Eastman Kodak (2003); sold to H.I.G. Capital (2010); acquired by Technicolor SA (2011)
- Successor: Technicolor SA
- Headquarters: Hollywood, California, U.S.
- Area served: North America
- Key people: Emory Cohen (co-founder, president); Leon Silverman (president)
- Services: Digital intermediate services, film scanning and recording, telecine, online video editing, audio post-production, multimedia services, DVD authoring, video compression, digital cinema packaging
- Owner: Eastman Kodak (2003–2010); H.I.G. Capital (2010–2011); Technicolor SA (2011)
- Parent: Eastman Kodak (2003–2010); H.I.G. Capital (2010–2011)
- Website: web.archive.org/web/20110713184714/http://www.laserpacific.com

LaserPacific Media Corporation was a television and motion picture post-production facility operating in Hollywood, Burbank, Calif., New York, and in Vancouver, Canada. Initially, Laser-Pacific was a publicly traded corporation, before becoming a subsidiary of Eastman Kodak (2003-2010). In 2010, the subsidiary came under the ownership of HIG Capital (2010-2011), and was subsequently bought by Technicolor SA in 2011.

LaserPacific provided technological solutions for motion pictures and television, including services such as online video editing, audio services, telecine, film scanning and recording, digital intermediates (DI), multimedia, DVD authoring and video compression, as well as digital cinema packaging for customers ranging from independent filmmakers to major studios. LaserPacific created a new workflow for independent film-makers called inDI. The company earned six Emmy awards for outstanding achievement in engineering development.

== History ==
Laser Pacific Media had its roots in several companies. The oldest, Pacific Video Industries (PVI), was a remote video truck operator that began in 1972. It provided the remote facilities for the 1977 location recordings of "The Nixon Interviews" when David Frost and the former President sat down for a grueling series of historic interviews. 28 hours, 45 minutes of material was recorded over 12 days in March 1977. The equipment PVI supplied included three RCA TK-44B cameras and RCA TR-70 Quadruplex recorders. The edited programs aired in May and September of 1977.

PVI opened Pacific Video Post Production Center, Ltd. in 1979 with financing through a limited partnership tax shelter for entertainers Olivia Newton-John, Karen and Richard Carpenter, and others. In 1983 it was acquired by Robert Seidenglanz, the maverick entrepreneur who founded Compact Video. A company known for being "a step ahead", Robert Seidenglanz also acquired and shaped the face of Television with the instrumental company RTS Systems. a PVI competitor in the television remote truck business.

Seidenglanz, several former Compact Video associates and former PVI executives operated Pacific Video as a post house focusing on filmed, network produced dramas.

Gregory L. Biller formed Spectra Image in 1983 as a post production service primarily for filmed situation comedies. In 1985 Spectra developed a transportable computerized random access editing system called Spectra System, which used proprietary laser disc technology for editing filmed or videotaped programs. The system allowed editors to quickly find shots and segments without waiting for tapes to shuttle from place to place.

The Spectra Ace was introduced to the market in 1986, and won the company an Emmy Award. The proprietary system for off-line editing incorporates an edit controller, a video switcher, single and dual-headed laser disc players, video monitors, videotape recorders, terminal equipment and associated software. It operated Laser Edit, Inc. as a marketing arm. Laser Edit became a post production house over time.

In 1990, Spectra Image and Pacific Video were merged into a new company, Laser Pacific, although the Pacific Video and Laser Edit corporate identities remain.

The company was acquired by Eastman Kodak in late 2003 for $30.5 million. In April 2010, Kodak sold Laser Pacific and its subsidiaries Laser-Edit, Inc, and Pacific Video, Inc. for an undisclosed sum to HIG Capital. In 2011, Technicolor SA acquired the company, changing the name of the facility to Technicolor.

== Emmy awards ==
LaserPacific and its predecessor companies received six Technology and Engineering Emmy Awards and related engineering honors from the National Academy of Television Arts and Sciences (NATAS).

Year	Recipient	Award	Citation
1987	Spectra Image, Inc.	Engineering Emmy Award	D220 Dual-Headed Videodisc Player
1989	Pacific Video, Inc.	Engineering Emmy Award	Electronic Laboratory
1993–94	LaserPacific Media Corporation	Outstanding Achievement in Engineering Development	Development and implementation of technology for the removal of temporal artifacts from film-originated 525-to-625-line video conversion
1996	LaserPacific Media Corporation	Engineering Emmy Award	Supercomputer Assembly
2001	LaserPacific	Engineering Emmy Award	Contributions to the development and adoption of 24P high-definition television technology
2003	LaserPacific Media Corporation	Engineering Emmy Award	24P HDTV Post-Production System
