= Chris Cookson =

American businessman

Chris Cookson (born November 19, 1946) was the President of Sony Pictures Technologies, a division of Sony Pictures Entertainment, and Chief Officer, Sony 3D Technology Center, Sony Corporation of America.

As President of Sony Pictures Technologies, Cookson oversaw the development and implementation of the studio's technology policy and processes. He also served as Sony Pictures’ chief liaison with other Sony Corporation businesses in the area of technology. Cookson holds more than 50 U.S. patents, including several involving DVDs, and has been leading the effort to maintain high standards of quality on theatrical digital post-production technologies.

== Career ==
Cookson opened Sony Pictures’ dedicated 4K digital intermediate facility, Colorworks, where world-renowned colorists utilize state-of-the-art technology to master movies in 2D and 3D. He also acts as the studio's representative and a top advisor to the Sony Corp. on all things 3D and is the Chief Officer overseeing the Sony 3D Technology Center based on the Sony Pictures Studio lot. Cookson is also leading the studio's effort to roll-out cloud-based production tools.

Prior to joining Sony Pictures, Cookson was Chief Technology Officer (CTO) of Warner Bros. Entertainment and President of the Warner Bros. Technical Operations Division. He became CTO in 1999, and began his career with Warner Bros. in 1992. Previously he served as vice president and general manager of operations and engineering for the CBS Television Network in New York, and before that, worked for ten years at the ABC Television Network, where he won an Emmy award for his work as Director of the ABC and International Olympics Broadcast Centers.

Sony announced the closure of its technologies unit in January 2014 and Cookson was laid off.

== Honors ==
Cookson is a fellow of The Society of Motion Picture and Television Engineers, a member of the Academy of Television Arts and Sciences, and a member of the Academy of Motion Picture Arts and Sciences. He has been awarded three Emmys, including the Charles F. Jenkins Lifetime Achievement Award, and has served on the Committee for Engineering Awards.

== Education ==
Cookson holds a BSE degree and an MBA from Arizona State University.
