= Jessamy Tiffen =

Australian scientist

Dr. Jessamy Tiffen is an Australian Scientist and senior researcher in the Melanoma Immunology and Oncology Program at the Centenary Institute of Cancer Medicine and Cell Biology at the University of Sydney, New South Wales, Australia. Her work primarily focuses on fundamental cell biology, examining the transformation of normal cells into cancerous ones and their responses to different treatments.

== Early life and career ==
Tiffen's interest in science stems from conversations with her grandfather growing up, a microbiologist who studied foot rot.

Tiffen's work focuses on melanoma, and why some melanomas respond to treatment in certain individuals but others do not. One specific area of interest for Tiffen is understanding why melanoma is the most common cancer among young Australians aged 15 to 39, comprising 20% of all cancer cases in this age group and being a significant cause of mortality among those aged 20 to 39.

Tiffen co-authored a study in 2016 which identified a drug that could be effective in fighting melanoma, and is currently researching a new treatment strategy with Dr. Hsin-Yi Tseng that involves inducing melanoma cellular self-destruction.

Her thesis was titled Characterising the functional effects of BORIS and CTCF using in vitro and in vivo models, and completed in 2011.

"Melanoma is the most common form of cancer affecting young Australians which is extremely sad but which is also extremely motivating,” she says. “Understanding the mechanics behind melanoma treatment resistance is essential to developing new drugs and finding new cures which will help save lives.”

Following the completion of her Ph.D.in Cancer Genetics, along with a post-doctoral research stint at the renowned Sanger Institute situated in Cambridge, Tiffen expanded her research portfolio to encompass the field of onco-immunology.

Her scholarly contributions include authorship of 26 peer-reviewed publications, spanning the domains of oncology and melanoma. She has published in journals such as Lancet Oncology, Nature Genetics (published twice), Cancer Research, Journal of the National Cancer Institute, Neoplasia, Molecular Cancer, and Journal of Pathology.

Furthermore, Tiffen's scientific knowledge research funding, includes grants totaling over half a million dollars. In the capacity of chief investigator, she has secured substantial financial support to propel her research in cancer research and onco-immunology.

== Gender Equity ==
Beyond her research, she also serves as a safety officer for the gender equity program and participates in the graduate students committee at the Centenary Institute, showcasing her commitment to various aspects of her field.

"I had a series of fantastic female science teachers who were extremely passionate about their work and who were absolutely committed to their students. They were all so positive and allowed my curiosity to flourish. They also helped me to believe in myself – to realize that I was good enough to take my science to a higher level and that there would be career opportunities out there for me. Looking back, I realize how essential it was, having such supportive female teachers encouraging me at such a formative stage of my life. I’ve benefited greatly in my current role,” she explains.

“The Centenary Institute has policies in place allowing part-time work and flexible hours for mothers. I also have access to a research assistant and was awarded a Carers Travel Award that allowed me to attend a major scientific conference with my baby. It’s this type of support that should be available in all organizations.”
