= Lee Filters =

Lee Filters is a manufacturer of colour filters and colour gels for the entertainment lighting, film and photography industries. Their colour gels for stage lighting are the industry standard in Europe while competing with other brands such as Rosco.

The company was founded in 1967 as part of the group that became Lee International. Lee Filters is now owned by Panavision. In 1980, the company was awarded the Bert Easey Technical Award of the British Society of Cinematographers for "the development of motion picture filters and control mediums".
