= Media Dispatch Protocol =

Multimedia streaming protocol

The Media Dispatch Protocol (MDP) was developed by the Pro-MPEG Media Dispatch Group to provide an open standard for secure, automated, and tapeless delivery of audio, video and associated data files. Such files typically range from low-resolution content for the web to HDTV and high-resolution digital intermediate files for cinema production.

MDP is essentially a middleware protocol that decouples the technical details of how delivery occurs from the business logic that requires delivery. For example, a TV post-production company might have a contract to deliver a programme to a broadcaster. An MDP agent allows users be able to deal with company and programme names, rather than with filenames and network endpoints. It can also provide a delivery service as part of a service oriented architecture.

MDP acts as a communication layer between business logic and low-level file transfer mechanisms, providing a way to securely communicate and negotiate transfer-specific metadata about file packages, delivery routing, deadlines, and security information, and to manage and coordinate file transfers in progress, whilst hooking all this information to project, company and job identifiers.

MDP works by implementing a 'dispatch transaction' layer by which means agents negotiate and agree the details of the individual file transfers required for the delivery, and control, monitor and report on the progress of the transfers. At the heart of the protocol is the 'Manifest' - an XML document that encapsulates the information about the transaction.

MDP is based on existing open technologies such as XML, HTTP and TLS. The protocol is specified in a layered way to allow the adoption of new technologies (e.g. Web Services protocols such as SOAP and WSDL) as required.

Since early 2005, multiple implementations based on draft versions of the Media Dispatch Protocol have been in use, both for technical testing, and, since April 2005, for real-world production work. The experience with these implementations, both at the engineering level, and at the practical production level, has been rolled into the 1.0rcX specification.

A newer, and more complete, open-source reference implementation is now available on SourceForge.

Media Dispatch Protocol (MDP) has been standardized by a SMPTE Working Group under the S22 Committee. This work has been published as SMPTE 2032-1-2007 (MDP specification), 2032-2-2007 (MDP/XML/HTTP mapping specification) and 2032-3-2007 (MDP Target pull profile specification). MDP is also supported by SMPTE Engineering Guideline EG 2032-4-2007 covering the use of MDP.
