= CineSync =

Video syncing software tool

cineSync is a software tool developed by Cospective, designed for viewing video content in sync with anyone, anywhere in the world. cineSync's drawing tools can be used for pointing at elements in the frame, sketching new ideas and writing text notes, all synchronised in real time with all participants in the review. Unlike screen sharing or streaming solutions, cineSync readily copes with the demands of high resolution video.

cineSync was officially released on October 31, 2005, although it was used prior to that date by Steven Spielberg during the making of War of the Worlds.

Instrumental in the development of cineSync was the team of Tony Clark, Alan Rogers, Neil Wilson and Rory McGregor, who were presented with a Technical Achievement Award by the Academy of Motion Picture Arts and Sciences (AMPAS) for the 2010 Scientific and Technical Achievement Awards. The academy's Scientific and Technical Awards honor the men, women and companies whose discoveries and innovations have contributed in significant, outstanding and lasting ways to motion pictures.
