= Tiffen, Carinthia =

Coordinates: 46°42′N 14°04′E

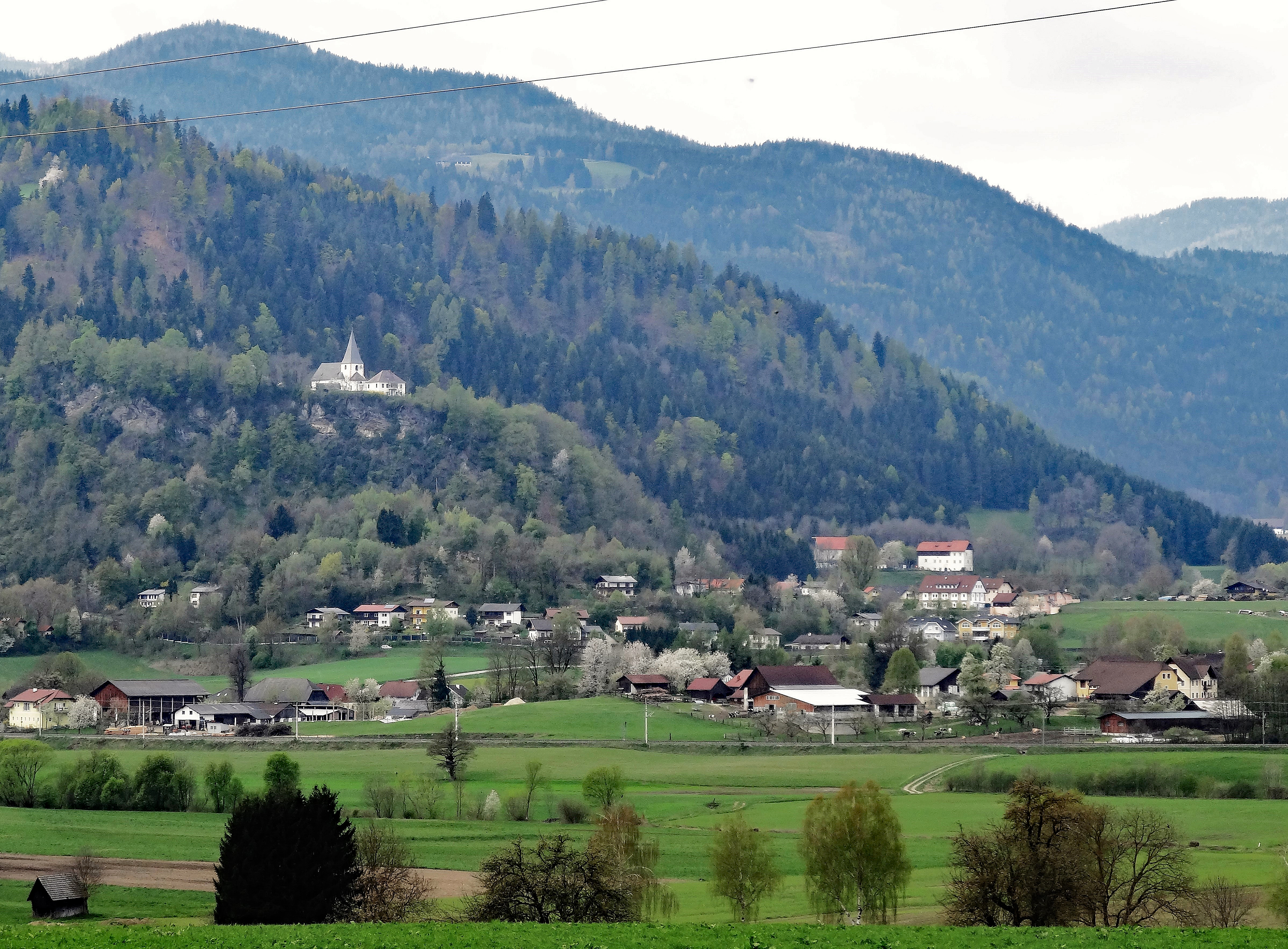
The village of Tiffen in Steindorf

Tiffen is a cadastral municipality in Steindorf am Ossiacher See, in the district of Feldkirchen in the Austrian state of Carinthia.

== Sights ==
- Catholic parish church
