= Evercast =

Software as a service company

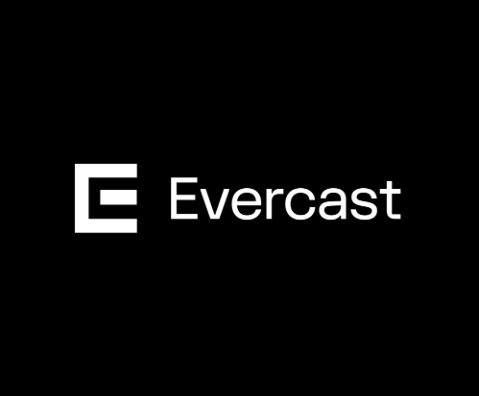
- Company type: Software as a service
- Industry: Film, television, advertising, video gaming
- Founded: 2015; 10 years ago in Scottsdale, Arizona
- Founder: Alex Cyrell, Blake Brinker, Brad Thomas, Roger Barton
- Headquarters: Scottsdale, Arizona, United States
- Area served: Global
- Key people: Alex Cyrell, Brad Thomas, Roger Barton
- Products: Evercast platform
- Website: evercast.us

Evercast is a privately held software as a service company that makes collaborative software primarily for the film, television, and other creative industry sectors. Its platform allows remotely located creative teams to collaborate in real-time on video production tasks, such as reviewing dailies, editing footage, sound mixing, animation, visual effects, and other components simultaneously. Its primary users are directors, editors, VFX artists, animators, and sound teams in the film, television, advertising, and video gaming industries.

== History ==
The company was founded in 2015 by Alex Cyrell, Brad Thomas, and Blake Brinker, and is based in Scottsdale, Arizona. After using the software, film editor Roger Barton joined the company and became a co-founder and investor. In 2020, Evercast won an Engineering Emmy award.

== Funding ==
In 2020, an unnamed angel investor provided just over $3 million of funding.
