= Tiffen (company) =

American lens filter manufacturer

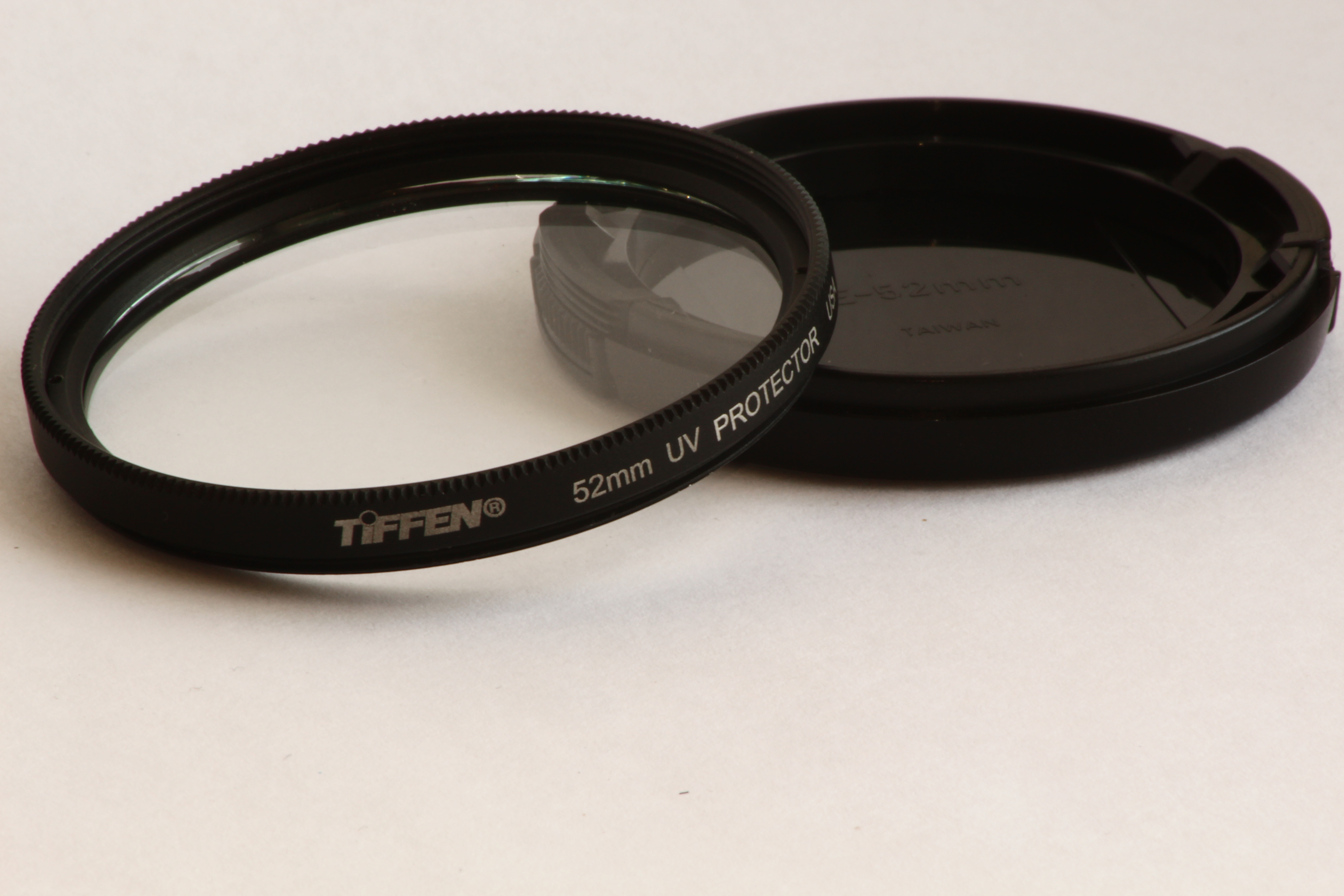
A Tiffen 52mm UV filter resting on a front end lens cap

The Tiffen Company is a company in Hauppauge, New York, U.S. which manufactures filters for photography, and other professional film and photography-related products. Founded in 1945, by Sol Tiffen who brought his brothers Leo and Nat into the business, the company has won several Academy Awards for technical achievements in filtration. Nat Tiffen, as well as Ira Tiffen, each won technical achievement awards.

The company's main competitors are Harrison & Harrison Optical Engineers, Inc., Heliopan, Hoya, Schneider, Formatt, and Lee. Tiffen also owns the Steadicam, Domke, Lowel Light, Davis & Sanford, Listec, Stroboframe, Zing Designs brands and product lines.

Nat Tiffen of Tiffen Manufacturing Corporation received an Academy Award for technical achievements in filtration. The commendation reads:

"For the production of high-quality, durable, laminated color filters for motion picture photography. Materials of uniform color characteristics are implanted between layers of optical glass and bonded together under extremes of heat and pressure. The outer surfaces are ground and polished to specified close tolerances, free of distortion and resistant to changes in temperature or humidity, then bound with a protective metal ring."

The 1999 award was presented on March 4, 2000.
