= Rodney Tiffen =

Australian emeritus professor of political science

Emeritus Professor Rodney Tiffen
- Born: 1950 (age 75–76)
- Occupation: Political Scientist
- Spouse: Kathryn Tiffen (married 1973)
- Children: Paul Tiffen (born 1984) and Ruth Tiffen (born 1987)

Academic work
- Institutions: University of Sydney

Rodney Tiffen FAHA is an Australian political scientist and academic known for his research on media, politics, and journalism. His work examines the relationship between the media and political institutions in Australia and internationally. He is an emeritus professor of political science in the Department of Government and International Relations at the University of Sydney and a Fellow of the Australian Academy of the Humanities in 2008.

His activities include: Visiting Professor in Australian Studies at the University of Tokyo (1984-86); Acting as an observer of South Africa’s media during that country’s first democratic election (1994); Conducting three reviews of the ABC's international broadcaster Radio Australia (1989, 1995, 1997); Working on the independent Finkelstein inquiry into media accountability (2011-12).

== Career and research ==
He began his academic career as a lecturer in sociology at the Caulfield Institute of Technology (now part of Monash University), before joining the University of Sydney in 1979. He completed his PhD at Monash University between 1972 and 1976. His doctoral research, Symbolic Processes of Out-Group Politics: The Press, the Public and the Third World, examined Australian press coverage of Asia and public attitudes toward Asia and the Vietnam War. The research contributed to Communications and Politics: The Press, the Public and the Third World (1974). In 1976, he was a research fellow in Australian–Southeast Asian relations in Singapore, where his research on Western foreign correspondents resulted in The News from Southeast Asia: The Sociology of Newsmaking, based partly on interviews with journalists.

In 1980, he received an Australian Research Council grant to study political reporting in Australia, conducting interviews with approximately 220 journalists alongside content analysis and case studies. The research resulted in News and Power (1989). His later work examined the relationship between media, politics and corruption in Scandals: Media, Politics and Corruption in Contemporary Australia (1999), and media coverage of the East Timor crisis in Diplomatic Deceits: Government, Media and East Timor (2001).

His experience in Japan contributed to his subsequent teaching and research in comparative democratic politics, political communication and research methods, including the co-authored sourcebooks How Australia Compares.

An era of marked instability in political leadership in Australia and the interesting ways in which media coverage interacted with political processes led to his book Disposable Leaders: Media and Leadership Coups from Menzies to Abbott (2017), which again used a comparative case study method, with some leadership challenges covered in depth, and basic data on all 73 leadership challenges in the major parties at federal and state level.

His later books include Rupert Murdoch: A Re-Assessment (2014) and Disposable Leaders: Media and Leadership Coups from Menzies to Abbott (2017). His most recent book, Australian Newspapers in the Television Age, 1956–2006, is a quantitative study of changes in the Australian newspaper industry from the introduction of television through the early digital era.

== Selected publications ==
- Tiffen, R. (1990). News and Power. North Sydney, Australia: Allen and Unwin.
- Tiffen, R. (2001). Diplomatic Deceits. Government, Media and East Timor. Sydney: University of New South Wales (UNSW) Press.
- Tiffen, R., Gittins, R. (2004). How Australia Compares. Australia: Cambridge University Press.
- Tiffen, R. (2017) Disposable leaders. New South Press
