= Society of Motion Picture and Television Engineers =

Association of media and entertainment engineers

- Abbreviation: SMPTE
- Pronunciation: /ˈsɪmptiː/, rarely /ˈsʌmptiː/
- Formation: 1916; 110 years ago
- Website: www.smpte.org

The Society of Motion Picture and Television Engineers (SMPTE) (/ˈsɪmptiː/, rarely /ˈsʌmptiː/), founded by Charles Francis Jenkins in 1916 as the Society of Motion Picture Engineers or SMPE, is a global professional association of engineers, technologists, and executives working in the media and entertainment industry. As an internationally recognized standards organization, SMPTE has published more than 800 technical standards and related documents for broadcast, filmmaking, digital cinema, audio recording, information technology (IT), and medical imaging.

SMPTE also publishes the SMPTE Motion Imaging Journal, provides networking opportunities for its members, produces academic conferences and exhibitions, and other industry-related functions. SMPTE membership is open to any individual or organization with an interest in the subject matter. In the US, SMPTE is a 501(c)(3) non-profit charitable organization.

== History ==
An informal organizational meeting was held in April 1916 at the Astor Hotel in New York City. Enthusiasm and interest increased, and meetings were held in New York and Chicago, culminating in the founding of the Society of Motion Picture Engineers in the Oak Room of the Raleigh Hotel, Washington DC on the 24th of July. Ten industry stakeholders attended and signed the Articles of Incorporation. Papers of incorporation were executed on 24 July 1916 and were filed on 10 August in Washington DC. With a second meeting scheduled, invitations were telegraphed to Charles Jenkins' industry friends, i.e., key players and engineering executives in the motion picture industry.

Three months later, 26 attended the first official meeting of the Society, the SMPE, at the Hotel Astor in New York City, on 2 and 3 October 1916. Charles Francis Jenkins was formally elected president, a constitution was ratified, an emblem for the Society was approved, and six committees were established.

At the July 1917 Society Convention in Chicago, a set of specifications including the dimensions of 35 mm film, 16 frames per second, etc., was adopted. SMPE set and issued a formal document reached by consensus, its first as an accredited Standards Development Organization (SDO), registering the specifications with the United States Bureau of Standards.

The SMPTE Centennial Gala took place on Friday, 28 October 2016, following the annual Conference and Exhibition; James Cameron and Douglas Trumbull received SMPTE’s top honors. SMPTE officially bestowed Honorary Membership, the Society’s highest honor, upon Avatar and Titanic director Cameron in recognition of his work advancing visual effects (VFX), motion capture, and stereoscopic 3D photography, as well as his experimentation in HFR. Presented by Oscar-winning special effects cinematographer Richard Edlund, SMPTE honored Trumbull, who was responsible for the VFX in 2001: A Space Odyssey and Blade Runner, with the Society’s most prestigious medal award, the Progress Medal. The award recognized Trumbull’s contributions to VFX, stereoscopic 3D, and HFR cinema, including his current work to enable stereoscopic 3D with his 120-frames-per-second Magi system.

== Educational and professional development activities ==
SMPTE's educational and professional development activities include technical presentations at regular meetings of its local Sections, annual and biennial conferences in the US and Australia and the SMPTE Motion Imaging Journal. The society sponsors many awards, the oldest of which are the SMPTE Progress Medal, the Samuel Warner Memorial Medal, and the David Sarnoff Medal. SMPTE also has a number of Student Chapters and sponsors scholarships for college students in the motion imaging disciplines.

== Standards ==
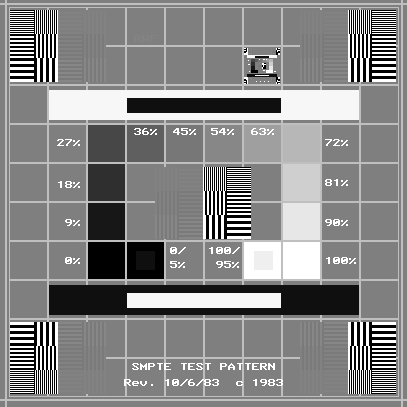
Recreation of the SMPTE RP-133 Medical Diagnostic Imaging Test Pattern

SMPTE standards documents are copyrighted and may be purchased from the SMPTE website or other distributors of technical standards. Standards documents may be purchased by the general public. Significant standards promulgated by SMPTE include:

- All film and television transmission formats and media, including digital.
- Physical interfaces for transmission of television signals and related data (such as SMPTE timecode and the serial digital interface) (SDI)
- SMPTE color bars
- Test card patterns and other diagnostic tools
- The Material Exchange Format (MXF)
- SMPTE 2110
- SMPTE ST 421:2013 (VC-1 video codec)

=== Film format ===
SMP(T)E'S first standard was to get everyone using 35-mm film width, four sprocket holes per frame, 1.37:1 picture ratio. Until then, there were competing film formats. With the standard, theaters could all run the same films.

=== Film frame rate ===
SMP(T)E's standard in 1927 was for the speed at which sound film is shown, 24 frames per second.

=== 3D television ===
SMPTE's task force on "3D to the home" produced a report on the issues and challenges and suggested minimum standards for the 3D home master that would be distributed after post-production to the ingest points of distribution channels for 3D video content. A group within the standards committees has begun to work on the formal definition of the SMPTE 3D Home Master.

=== Digital cinema ===
In 1999, SMPTE established the DC28 technology committee for the foundations of Digital Cinema.

== Membership ==
=== SMPTE Fellows ===
- Terry Adams, NBC Olympics, LLC
- Andy Beale, BT Sport
- Lynn D. Claudy, National Association of Broadcasters
- Lawrence R. Kaplan, CEO of SDVI

== Honors and awards program ==
The SMPTE presents awards to individuals for outstanding contributions in fields of the society.

=== Honorary membership and the honor roll ===
Recipients include:

- Renville "Ren" H. McMann Jr. (2017)
- James Cameron (2016)
- Oscar B. "O.B." Hanson (2015)
- George Lucas (2014)
- John Logie Baird (2014)
- Philo Taylor Farnsworth (1996)
- Ray M. Dolby (1992)
- Kenjiro Takayanagi (1988)
- Linwood G. Dunn (1984)
- Herbert T. Kalmus (1958)
- Walt Disney (1955)
- Vladimir K. Zworykin (1950)
- Samuel L. Warner (1946)
- George Eastman (1928)
- Thomas Alva Edison (1928)
- Louis Lumiere (1928)
- C. Francis Jenkins (1926)

=== Progress Medal ===
The Progress Medal, instituted in 1935, is SMPTE's oldest and most prestigious medal, and is awarded annually for contributions to engineering aspects of the film and/or television industries.

Recipients include:

- Douglas Trumbull (2016)
- Ioan Allen (2014)
- David Wood (2012)
- Edwin Catmull (2011)
- Birney Dayton (2008)
- Clyde D. Smith (2007)
- Roderick Snell (2006)
- S. Merrill Weiss (2005)
- Dr. Kees Immink (2004)
- Stanley N. Baron (2003)
- William C. Miller (2002)
- Bernard J. Lechner (2001)
- Edwin Catmull (1996)
- Ray Dolby (1983)
- Harold E. Edgerton (1959)
- Fred Waller (1953)
- Vladimir K. Zworykin (1950)
- John G. Frayne (1947)
- Walt Disney (1940)
- Herbert Kalmus (1938)
- Edward W. Kellogg (1937)
- Kenneth Mees (1936)

=== David Sarnoff Gold Medal ===
- Chuck Pagano (2013)
- James M. DeFilippis (2012)
- Bernard J. Lechner (1996)
- Stanley N. Baron (1991)
- William F. Schreiber (1990)
- Adrian Ettlinger (1976)
- Joseph A. Flaherty, Jr. (1974)
- Peter C. Goldmark (1969)
- W. R. G. Baker (1959)
- Albert Rose (1958)
- Charles Ginsburg (1957)
- Robert E. Shelby (1956)
- Arthur V. Loughren (1953)
- Otto H. Schade (1951)

=== Eastman Kodak Gold Medal ===
The Eastman Kodak Gold Medal, instituted in 1967, recognizes outstanding contributions that lead to new or unique educational programs utilizing motion pictures, television, high-speed and instrumentation photography or other photography sciences. Recent recipients are

- Andrew Laszlo (2006)
- James MacKay (2005)
- Dr. Roderick T. Ryan (2004)
- George Spiro Dibie (2003)
- Jean-Pierre Beauviala (2002)

=== Natalie M. and Herbert T. Kalmus Medal ===
The Natalie M. and Herbert T. Kalmus Medal, formerly known as Technicolor - Natalie M. and Herbert T. Kalmus Medal, instituted in 1955, is awarded for contributions of quality innovation in motion picture post-production and distribution services. Recent recipients are:

- Beverly Wood (2020)

== Related organizations ==
Related organizations include

- Advanced Television Systems Committee (ATSC)
- Audio Engineering Society (AES)
- BBC Research Department
- Digital Video Broadcasting (DVB)
- European Broadcasting Union (EBU)
- ITU Radiocommunication Sector (formerly known as the CCIR)
- ITU Telecommunication Sector (formerly known as the CCITT)
- Institute of Electrical and Electronics Engineers (IEEE)
- Joint Photographic Experts Group (JPEG)
- Moving Picture Experts Group (MPEG)

== See also ==
- Digital Picture Exchange
- General Exchange Format (GXF)
- Glossary of video terms
- Outline of film (Extensive alphabetical listing)
- Media Dispatch Protocol SMPTE 2032 parts 1, 2 and 3
- Video tape recorder (VTR) standards defined by SMPTE

== Bibliography ==
- Charles S. Swartz (editor). Understanding Digital Cinema. A Professional Handbook. Elsevier, 2005.
- Philip J. Cianci (Editorial Content Director), The SMPTE Chronicle, Vol. I 1916 – 1949 Motion Pictures, Vol. II 1950 – 1989 Television, Vol III. 1990 – 2016 Digital Media, SMPTE, 2022.
- Philip J. Cianci (Editorial Content Director), Magic and Miracles - 100 Years of Moving Image Science and Technology - The Work of the Society of Motion Picture and Television Engineers, SMPTE, 2017.
- Philip J. Cianci (Editorial Content Director), The Honor Roll and Honorary Members of The Society of Motion Picture and Television Engineers, SMPTE, 2016
