= List of Indiana Jones characters =

This is a list of characters in the Indiana Jones series.

== Overview ==
List indicators

This section includes characters who will appear or have appeared in the Indiana Jones film franchise.

- An empty grey cell indicates the character was not in the film, or that the character's official presence has not yet been confirmed.
- ^{C} indicates a cameo role.
- ^{P} indicates an appearance in onscreen photographs.
- ^{V} indicates a voice-only role.

Characters	Films					Television series	
Characters	Indiana Jones and the Raiders of the Lost Ark	Indiana Jones and the Temple of Doom	Indiana Jones and the Last Crusade	Indiana Jones and the Kingdom of the Crystal Skull	Indiana Jones and the Dial of Destiny	The Young Indiana Jones Chronicles	
Characters	Indiana Jones and the Raiders of the Lost Ark	Indiana Jones and the Temple of Doom	Indiana Jones and the Last Crusade	Indiana Jones and the Kingdom of the Crystal Skull	Indiana Jones and the Dial of Destiny	Season 1	Season 2
Characters	1981	1984	1989	2008	2023	1992	1992–1993
Dr. Henry "Indiana" Jones, Jr.	Harrison Ford	Harrison Ford	Harrison Ford	Harrison Ford	Harrison Ford	Sean Patrick Flanery (age 16–21)	
Dr. Henry "Indiana" Jones, Jr.	Harrison Ford	Harrison Ford	Harrison Ford	Harrison Ford	Harrison Ford	Corey Carrier (age 8–10)	
Dr. Henry "Indiana" Jones, Jr.	Harrison Ford	Harrison Ford	Harrison Ford	Harrison Ford	Harrison Ford	George Hall (age 93)	
Dr. Henry "Indiana" Jones, Jr.	Harrison Ford	Harrison Ford	River Phoenix (age 13)	Harrison Ford	Anthony Ingruber (age 45)		
Dr. Henry "Indiana" Jones, Jr.	Harrison Ford	Harrison Ford	River Phoenix (age 13)	Harrison Ford	Anthony Ingruber (age 45)	Boutalat (age 3)	Harrison Ford (age 50)
Dr. Henry "Indiana" Jones, Jr.	Harrison Ford	Harrison Ford	River Phoenix (age 13)	Harrison Ford	Anthony Ingruber (age 45)	Neil Boulane (infant)	Harrison Ford (age 50)
Sallah	John Rhys-Davies		John Rhys-Davies	John Rhys-Davies^{P}	John Rhys-Davies		
Marion Ravenwood	Karen Allen			Karen Allen	Karen Allen^{C}		
Marcus Brody	Denholm Elliott		Denholm Elliott	Denholm Elliott^{P}			
René Belloq	Paul Freeman						
Major Arnold Toht	Ronald Lacey						
Colonel Dietrich	Wolf Kahler						
Wilhelmina "Willie" Scott		Kate Capshaw		Kate Capshaw^{P}			
Wan "Short Round" Li Jones		Ke Huy Quan					
Mola Ram		Amrish Puri					
Maharaja Zalim Singh		Raj Singh					
Chattar Lal		Roshan Seth					
Professor Henry Jones Sr.			Sean Connery	Sean Connery^{P}	Sean Connery^{P}	Lloyd Owen	Lloyd Owen
Professor Henry Jones Sr.			Alex Hyde-White (young)	Sean Connery^{P}	Sean Connery^{P}	Lloyd Owen	Lloyd Owen
Walter Donovan			Julian Glover				
Dr. Elsa Schneider			Alison Doody				
Colonel Vogel			Michael Byrne				
Kazim			Kevork Malikyan				
Herman			J. J. Hardy				
Henry "Mutt" Jones III				Shia LaBeouf	Shia LaBeouf^{P}		
Irina Spalko				Cate Blanchett			
George "Mac" Michale				Ray Winstone			
Professor Harold Oxley				John Hurt			
Colonel Dovchenko				Igor Jijikine			
Dean Charles Stanforth				Jim Broadbent			
Helena Shaw					Phoebe Waller-Bridge		
Helena Shaw					Holly Lawton (age 10)		
Jürgen Voller					Mads Mikkelsen		
Colonel Weber					Thomas Kretschmann		
Klaber					Boyd Holbrook		
Mason					Shaunette Renée Wilson		
Basil Shaw					Toby Jones		
Renaldo					Antonio Banderas^{C}		
Teddy Kumar					Ethann Isidore		
Hauke					Olivier Richters		
Anna Mary Jones						Ruth De Sosa	Ruth De Sosa
Helen Seymour						Margaret Tyzack	Margaret Tyzack
Remy Baudouin						Ronny Coutteure	Ronny Coutteure
Thomas Edward "T. E." Lawrence						Joseph A. Bennett	Douglas Henshall

== Family tree ==
Jones family tree

Mr. Jones	Mrs. Jones
Fred Jones (Note: Established in Young Indiana Jones' Spring Break Adventure (2001).)	Grace Jones	Henry Walton Jones, Sr.	Anna Mary Jones
Fr. Phillip Byrne (Note: Established in Indiana Jones and the Dance of the Giants (1991).)	Dr. Joanna Campbell	Mr. Campbell	Abner Ravenwood (Note: Established in Indiana Jones and the Raiders of the Lost Ark (1981).)	Mrs. Ravenwood
Frank Jones	Susie Jones (Note: Established in Young Indiana Jones and the Journey of Radiance (1993).)	Adrian Powell	Deirdre Campbell Jones (Note: In Indiana Jones and the Seven Veils (1991), Indiana Jones and Deirdre Campbell marry, before the latter is killed in a plane crash.)	Indiana "Indy" Jones; Dr. Henry Walton Jones, Jr.	Marion Ravenwood Jones	Colin Williams
Sophie Jones (Note: Established in Young Indiana Jones and the Mystery of the Blues (1993).)	Mr. Jones	Mutt Williams Jones; Henry Walton Jones III (Note: Established in Indiana Jones and the Kingdom of the Crystal Skull (2008).)	Short Round; Wan Li Jones (Note: In the novelization of Indiana Jones and the Temple of Doom (1984) and The Further Adventures of Indiana Jones (1995), Wan "Short Round" Li is revealed to have been adopted by Indiana Jones following the events of the film.)
Lucy Jones (Note: Established in Young Indiana Jones and Love's Sweet Song (1993).)	Spike Jones	Caroline Jones	Mr. Jones
Harold "Harry" Jones	Annie Jones

== Introduced in Raiders of the Lost Ark ==
=== Indiana Jones ===
Dr. Henry Walton "Indiana" Jones, Jr. (Harrison Ford), the titular character and the main protagonist of the franchise, He is an archaeologist and part-time college professor.

=== Satipo ===
Satipo (Alfred Molina) is a guide accompanying Indy in the temple in the film's opening. He follows behind him through the temple's traps on the way in. When Indy and Satipo reach a pit on the way out, Satipo makes it over with Indy's whip and Indy is stuck on the other side. Indy throws over the fertility idol to Satipo, who offered to throw him his whip for it; but he betrays Indy, dropping the whip and fleeing. In his haste, he forgot to mind the wall trap he had witnessed Indy test and is killed; Indiana makes it out.

In an early script of the film, written by Lawrence Kasdan, Satipo flees the boulder with Indy, only to be met with Barranca's ultimate fate in the finished film and killed by the Hovito tribe, but the script was scrapped.

He appears in the video game Indiana Jones and the Infernal Machine (1999) in the secret level "Return to Peru", where Indiana returns to the same temple and finds the second idol.

His name is based on that of a Peruvian town, Satipo in Satipo Province in Junín Region.

In the film, Harrison Ford mispronounces his name when he says, "Adios, Sapito."

=== Jock Lindsey ===
Jock Lindsey (Fred Sorenson) is an American freelance pilot. Jock cut his teeth as a stunt pilot performing in Midwest airshows and relocated to Venezuela after a rumored flight-related tragedy. He frequently was hired by Jones to fly the archaeologist to remote parts of the world. Easygoing and affable, Jock butted heads with Indiana on only one subject: his pet snake Reggie. According to the novelization of Raiders of the Lost Ark written by Campbell Black aka Campbell Armstrong (1981), Jock is Scottish. The "Jock Lindsey's Hangar Bar" cocktail lounge at Disney Springs says he settled down in central Florida in 1938.

=== Barranca ===
Barranca (Vic Tablian) is the other Peruvian guide who turns against Indiana. When Barranca draws a revolver, Indy uses his famous bullwhip and wraps the whip around the gun. The gun is yanked from Barranca's hand and lands in a stream. Barranca then runs away but is later killed with poisonous darts by the Hovitos tribe.

In the early script of the film, written by Lawrence Kasdan, when Barranca pulls his gun out on Jones, the archaeologist uses his whip to make Barranca shoot himself, but the script was scrapped.

Like Satipo, his name is based on a Peruvian town and county, Barranca, Barranca Ward, Barranca County, Lima state.

=== René Belloq ===
Belloq (right) and Toht

René Emile Belloq (Paul Freeman) is a French archaeologist and the main antagonist in Raiders of the Lost Ark. Belloq is the arch-nemesis of Jones, and the two know each other very well, including each other's strengths and weaknesses, as shown by their very first exchange in the film, where Jones says "Too bad the Hovitos don't know you the way I do, Belloq."; to which Belloq replies: "Yes, too bad. You could warn them, if only you spoke Hovitos". He is highly intelligent, as evinced by Sallah's "They have not one brain among them... except one... he is very clever - a French archaeologist...".

In the film's opening, Belloq and Hovitos tribesmen force Indiana to hand over a fertility idol he has braved numerous booby traps to obtain. Belloq aids the Nazis in finding the Ark of the Covenant, as he wants to use the relic to speak with God. When the Ark is opened, its contained spirits engulf Belloq in flames and cause his head to explode; Indiana and Marion are spared and turn the Ark over to the US government. At one point in the film, Belloq says to Indy that they are very much alike and that he is Indy's "shadowy reflection".

The novelization of the movie reveals Belloq became Indiana's foe at graduate school, when he plagiarized his essay on stratigraphy, thus winning an award that rightfully belonged to Indiana. Another encounter in 1934 is detailed, when Indiana spends months preparing a dig in Rub' al Khali, only to arrive and discover Belloq has excavated the region. Indiana also encounters Belloq in two novels by Max McCoy, set before the films, in which Jones and Belloq meet for the first time (contradicting the novelization of Raiders of the Lost Ark) and Belloq gives Indiana information for locating a crystal skull.

Belloq's first name was Emile in an August 1979 draft of the script, and Marion was originally more infatuated with him. Spielberg considered French singer and actor Jacques Dutronc and Italian actor Giancarlo Giannini for the part before casting Freeman. While watching Death of a Princess he noticed that Freeman had very piercing eyes.

Belloq was intended to appear in the prequel Indiana Jones and the Temple of Doom, but the character was written out for unknown reasons. He was set to appear in The Young Indiana Jones Chronicles, but the show was canceled before its third season. He and the 21-year-old Indiana would have become friends in Honduras in 1920, although his ruthless traits would be exhibited by stealing and selling a crystal skull to F. A. Mitchell-Hedges. He would have aided Indiana and Percy Fawcett in Brazil in an episode set in 1921. He was also intended to appear in the canceled Dark Horse Comics limited series Indiana Jones and the Lost Horizon, in which he appears in the prologue discovering a fake Turin Shroud in New York City in 1926.

In an early script of Indiana Jones and the Kingdom of the Crystal Skull called Indiana Jones and the City of the Gods and written by Frank Darabont, the Nazis were set to appear, seeking revenge for Belloq's and Toht's deaths, but the script was rejected.

Kenner released a 3.75 in (95 mm) action figure (dressed in Jewish robes) in late 1982, which was available by mail order until 1983. A Belloq figure in normal clothes was also released in 1983. He was included in a TSR, Inc. collection of metal miniatures the following year. Hasbro released a 3.75 in (95 mm) Belloq in Jewish robes in 2008 (which comes with the fertility idol). An Adventure Heroes figurine, which comes with the Ark and a murderous spirit, will also be released. Lego made a Belloq figure for a playset based on the Raiders opening sequence.

=== Marcus Brody ===
Denholm Elliott as Marcus Brody.

Marcus Brody (Denholm Elliott) is an academic and curator who has known Indy since he was a child. Brody was friends with Indy's father, Henry Sr., and served as something of a surrogate father figure, as Indy did not get along well with his own father. In the film, Brody makes a deal with government agents that Indy will recover the Ark of the Covenant and put it in a museum, but the agents put it away in a top secret hiding place, much to his disappointment. He reappeared in The Last Crusade (1989), aiding Indiana on the search for his father and getting captured by the Nazis. In 1940, Marcus Brody retired as curator of the National Museum and accepted a position as dean of students at Marshall College. After Brody died in 1952, Indy lobbied hard for the bronze statue of Brody featured in Indiana Jones and the Kingdom of the Crystal Skull on the Marshall College grounds. The statue of Brody lists his years of service as dean of students from 1939 to 1944. Denholm Elliott's death in 1992 was written into Indiana Jones and the Kingdom of the Crystal Skull with the death of his character.

Spielberg cast Elliott in the role because he was a fan of the actor. His return in Crusade was motivated by the director's desire to have the film hew closer to Raiders. He was initially portrayed in the first film as a knowledgeable, accomplished archaeologist in his own right, with much apparent field work under his belt, and tells Indy that he would accompany him on his quest but for other responsibilities. By the third film in the series, though still portrayed as intelligent, his character had changed to a somewhat bumbling figure who Indy mentions had gotten lost in his own museum and provided much of the film's comic relief. Brody has also appeared in the video games Indiana Jones and the Fate of Atlantis and Indiana Jones and the Great Circle, the Marvel Comics Indiana Jones series, a Young Indiana Jones book and the Bantam novels series.

=== Marion Ravenwood ===
Marion Ravenwood (Karen Allen) had a crush on Jones in 1926, leading him to pursue a relationship with her, despite the fact that she was a minor at the time. This had ended abruptly, when Jones' mentor and Marion's father, Abner Ravenwood, had discovered their romance. Ten years later, a resentful Marion is forced to aid Indiana in retrieving the Ark of the Covenant after her bar in Nepal is burned down by Arnold Ernst Toht and his thugs. Marion was a regular supporting character in the Marvel Comics series set after the film.

In the early script of the film, written by Lawrence Kasdan, Marion was set to be a prostitute after Abner's death, but George Lucas rejected the script.

According to Steven Spielberg, Marion was set to appear in the prequel Indiana Jones and the Temple of Doom, along, with her father, Abner, but George Lucas had scrapped the idea. During the development of Indiana Jones and the Kingdom of the Crystal Skull, an early draft, called Indiana Jones and the Saucermen from Mars, written by Jeb Stuart, Marion was set to appear in the wedding of Indy and Dr. Elaine McGregor, alongside Sallah, Short Round, and Willie Scott, but the draft was rejected. In another early script, Indiana Jones and the City of the Gods, written by Frank Darabont, Marion was set to appear again as Indy's partner, but this draft was also scrapped.

Allen reprised the role for Indiana Jones and the Kingdom of the Crystal Skull in 2008. It is revealed, over the course of the film, that Indy and Marion were engaged to be married, but Indiana left her a week before the wedding as he was concerned that it was not going to work out. Therefore, Indiana was unaware that Marion had married his old friend Colin Williams, and given birth to Indiana's son, Henry Jones III, who adopted the nickname "Mutt" as a teenager. After the two are reunited, when a Soviet plot attempts to find a secret discovered by an old colleague of Abner and Indiana, Marion reveals the truth about Mutt's parentage and Indiana admits that none of the women he was with after Marion left compared to her. Once they return to America, the two marry in a ceremony at the college.

Allen reprised the role for Indiana Jones and the Dial of Destiny in 2023 in a cameo appearance. It is revealed, over the course of the film, that Indy and Marion are in the process of a divorce after Mutt was killed in the Vietnam War. After Indy is brought back from travelling back in time to Ancient Greece by his goddaughter, Helena, he reconciles with Marion and the mourning couple embrace.

=== Arnold Toht ===
Ronald Lacey as Arnold Ernst Toht

SS-Sturmbannführer Arnold Ernst Toht (Ronald Lacey) is the secondary antagonist of Raiders of the Lost Ark. He is the Sicherheitsdienst (SD) agent who attempts to steal the medallion from Marion, but his hand is badly burned by it, as it had been engulfed in flames prior to his grabbing it. The inscriptions on the medallion leave scars on his palm, which the Nazis use to determine the Ark's location; however, they dig in the wrong place because the other side of the medallion had further instructions which were not transferred to Toht's hand. When the Ark is opened, its supernatural powers melt his face and kill him. (In the novelization and the original script, Toht dies earlier in the story when Gobler's car flies off a cliff during the chase sequence with Indiana Jones riding on horseback to intercept the truck carrying the Ark.) In a sequel comic book, Indy is confronted by his vengeful sister Ilsa.

Toht was called Belzig in the August 1979 draft of the script. Spielberg wanted him to be a cyborg, with a metal arm that could convert to a flamethrower or machine gun. The 1979 script gave him a light in place of a right eye. Lucas rejected these as too far-fetched. Lacey was cast as Toht, as he reminded Spielberg of Peter Lorre. Klaus Kinski turned down the role, as he hated the script. Lacey later made a cameo appearance in The Last Crusade as Reichsfuhrer-SS Heinrich Himmler, opposite Michael Sheard (who himself auditioned for Toht) as Adolf Hitler.

In Indiana Jones and the City of the Gods, an early script (written by Frank Darabont) of Indiana Jones and the Kingdom of the Crystal Skull, the Nazis were set to appear seeking revenge for Toht and Belloq's death, but the script was rejected.

A 3.75 in (95 mm) figure was released in late 1982, and he was part of a metal miniature collection in 1984.

=== Herman Dietrich ===
Oberst Herman Dietrich (Wolf Kahler) is a major antagonist of Raiders of the Lost Ark. He is an arrogant German Army officer who serves as the head of the Tanis excavation project. He was chosen by Hitler due to his ruthless efficiency. Dietrich expresses doubt over Belloq's desire to perform a "Jewish ritual" with the Ark and also refers to Captain Katanga as a "savage", due to the captain hinting at selling Marion Ravenwood into slavery. He is killed when the Ark is opened causing his head to implode.

In the early script of the film, written by Lawrence Kasdan, Dietrich's surname was Schliemann, and he was set to survive the Ark of the Covenant's opening; after this, he and other surviving Nazis were set to pursue Marion and Indy in a minecar chase. However, the script was scrapped, and the minecar chase was recycled for Indiana Jones and the Temple of Doom. The only piece of Dietrich merchandise has been a 1984 metal miniature. The DK Indiana Jones guide established his first name in the index.

=== Sallah ===
Sallah Mohammed Faisel el-Kahir (John Rhys-Davies) is an Egyptian excavator and a friend of Indiana. He reappeared in Indiana Jones and the Last Crusade. He also appeared in a Marvel comic, a Young Indiana Jones book (which detailed his first meeting with Indiana in 1913), and two Bantam novels.

In Indiana Jones and the Kingdom of the Crystal Skull, Sallah does not appear physically, but appears in a photo in Indy's office. In an interview of TheForce.net, Davies told that Steven Spielberg offered him to return as Sallah in a cameo, but he declined. During the development of Indiana Jones and the Kingdom of the Crystal Skull, an early draft titled Indiana Jones and the Saucermen from Mars, written by Jeb Stuart, Sallah was set to appear in the wedding of Indy and Dr. Elaine McGregor, along with Marion Ravenwood, Short Round, and Willie Scott, but the draft was scrapped. On February 20, 2016, Davies expressed interest in reprising his role of Sallah in the upcoming fifth movie.

In Indiana Jones and the Dial of Destiny, Sallah now works in New York City as a cab driver, after Indy helped his family emigrate to America following the Second World War, helping out Indy in 1969 when he is framed for murder by the CIA.

Danny DeVito was the original choice to portray Sallah, but he declined. Also, Kevork Malikyan auditioned to portray Sallah, but was not chosen (he later portrayed Kazim in Last Crusade).

=== Cairo Swordsman ===
The Cairo Swordsman (Terry Richards) appears when Marion is being kidnapped by Nazi forces. The entire crowd moves aside when the swordsman appears, swinging his scimitar and coercing Indiana into a battle. Jones simply pulls out his revolver and shoots him, causing the crowd to burst into cheers. The gag came about because Harrison Ford was suffering from dysentery and did not want to spend three days filming a "conventional" fight. On the first take, Richards "took a minute-and-a-half to die", so on the next take, Ford shot him so quickly that Richards fell over in surprise. Ford would later say he felt sorry for Richards because "he worked so hard on that swordplay".

Richards felt "it turned out to be the funniest thing in the film", and was surprised he was not cut out of the picture. Many, including Lucas, disliked the brutality of the gag, and Richards concurred the joke was very morbid. Nevertheless, it was placed 38th on Empire's Top 50 film gags list, and it is one of Spielberg's favorite scenes in the series. Kenner released a 3.75 in (95 mm) figure of the swordsman in 1982. Walt Disney Parks & Resorts released a figurine of the swordsman in a box set in January 2001 (to scale with the Micro Machines vehicles models), and a 4.5 in (110 mm) figure in August 2003. In 2008, Hasbro released a 3.75 in (95 mm) action figure, an Adventure Heroes figure, and a 12 in (300 mm) figure.

=== Gobler ===
Major Gobler (Anthony Higgins) is a German major of the military contingent attached to the Tanis project. He is personally chosen by Hitler due to his ruthlessness and efficiency. Gobler is strict whereas Dietrich is practical. He dies when the truck driven by Jones rams his car, sending it flying off a cliff.

=== Simon Katanga ===
Simon Katanga (George Harris), is a friend of Sallah and the captain of the Bantu Wind, a tramp steamer Indiana and Marion use to transport the Ark. When his ship is boarded by the Nazis, he attempts to protect the pair, claiming to the Nazis that he killed Indiana and intends to sell Marion to slavery. Colonel Dietrich believes him and calls him a savage.

Katanga appears in a Marvel Comics sequel, in which Indiana bails him from a Panama City jail after being charged with rum-running. Katanga and his crew take Indiana to the Aleutian Islands, where they are attacked by pirates, who commandeer the Bantu Wind. Following a battle, Katanga regains his ship.

=== Luftwaffe Mechanic ===
The Luftwaffe Mechanic (Pat Roach) challenges Indiana to a one-on-one fight as Indy is attempting to reach the pilot of a flying wing. The muscular mechanic gets the better of Indy for most of the fight, which takes place on the airstrip, but he fails to move away from the propeller of the flying wing in time and is cut to pieces.

=== Abner Ravenwood ===
Abner Ravenwood is Marion's father and an unseen character. He was Indiana's mentor at the University of Chicago, but the two split in 1926 when Indiana had an affair with the teenage Marion. The Ark of the Covenant was his lifelong obsession, and he owned the headpiece to the Staff of Ra, which could pinpoint its location. He is said to be dead when Indiana and the Nazis come to Nepal (where the Ravenwoods live) in 1936, to use it to find the Ark at Tanis. The novelization details he died in an avalanche in 1936.

In Marvel Comics' The Further Adventures of Indiana Jones, it is hinted that Abner is alive when Indiana and Marion travel to the fictitious city Ra-Lundi to free its people from the power of a meteorite: Indiana is briefly aided by a masked man. Abner is in the back-story to a gamebook, where he lost an ebony dove from Malakula after being chased off by the island's inhabitants in 1927; five years later Indiana and his cousin must retrieve it. A supplement to a role-playing game said that Abner studied under Franz Boas, and disliked the British for their "armchair anthropology", in which they made assumptions about other cultures based on reports instead of exploring themselves.

Abner was set to appear along his daughter Marion in Indiana Jones and the Temple of Doom, but George Lucas scrapped the idea. In the early scripts of Indiana Jones and the Last Crusade, Fedora was intended to be Abner, but the idea was rejected. Abner was intended to appear in the canceled third season of The Young Indiana Jones Chronicles, when a ten-year-old Indiana meets him searching for the Ark on the Temple Mount. The canceled Dark Horse Comics limited series Indiana Jones and the Lost Horizon was going to depict him and Indiana recovering the headpiece to the Staff of Ra in Tibet in 1926. Artist Hugh Fleming modeled Abner's appearance on actor Wilford Brimley, and the series would explain that Abner taught Indiana to behave cynically with others, so that they would not think he was crazy if he mentioned his encounters with the supernatural. The character was also intended to appear in the 2003 video game Indiana Jones and the Emperor's Tomb (set in 1935, before Temple of Doom) but the developers of the game deemed his role as Indy's partner "too unwieldy".

== Introduced in Temple of Doom ==
=== Willie Scott ===
Willie in Indiana Jones and the Temple of Doom

Wilhelmina "Willie" Scott (Kate Capshaw) is an American singer working at Club Obi Wan, a reference to Star Wars character Obi-Wan Kenobi, in 1935 Shanghai, who is caught up in Indiana's adventures and becomes his love interest. Unlike Marion, she is more of a damsel in distress. According to the novelization, Willie was born in Missouri to a wealthy family. But in Indiana Jones and the Temple of Doom, she tells Indiana that, her grandfather had been a magician who had "made a lot of children very happy and died a very poor man". She moved to Shanghai when she was unable to break into Hollywood during the Great Depression. She also claims to know Al Capone (whom Indy met in 1920) and Frank Nitti. She returns to the United States following her adventure. Spielberg liked the character of Willie, describing her;

Willie has led this pampered life and feels that's what's due her, to be cared for and looked after. She meets Indiana Jones, a person unlike anyone she has ever been involved with, and ends up going off with him. In the course of all their adventures, all of her earlier life is stripped away from her, and Willie must fall back on her own resources. She discovers that she is a very strong woman, a gutsy lady. Willie is a much different character than the woman Karen Allen played in Raiders.

In Indiana Jones and the Kingdom of the Crystal Skull, she does not appear physically, but appears in a photo in Indy's office. In an early script of the film called Indiana Jones and the Saucermen of Mars, written, by Jeb Stuart, Willie was set to appear in Indy and Dr. Elaine McGregor's wedding, along, with Sallah, Short Round and Marion Ravenwood, but the script was rejected. In another early script, Indiana Jones and the City of the Gods, written, by Frank Darabont, Scott was set to be mentioned by Indy, but this script was also rejected.

Willie was named after Spielberg's dog. Spielberg wanted Willie to be a complete contrast to Marion, so Capshaw dyed her brown hair blonde for the part. Spielberg later married Capshaw in 1991. A Willie figure was made by LJN in 1984, but it was never released, although an unpainted metal miniature of her was made for a TSR, Inc. collection that year. She has appeared in two Lego sets: Shanghai Chase, and The Temple of Doom.

=== Lao Che ===
Lao Che (Roy Chiao) is a Chinese gangster, the owner of Club Obi Wan, and Willie Scott's employer; his two sons, Chen and Kao Chan, are prominent members of their father's gang. Che hires Indy to find the ashes of Nurhaci and promises him a valuable diamond in return. Indy recovers the ashes and Che sends Kao Chan to steal the urn while Indy is sleeping to get out of paying him, but Indy retains the urn and severs Kao's left forefinger, letting him live. Indy shows up to Club Obi Wan to make the exchange; Che threatens Indy for the urn, but Indy takes Willie hostage to complete the exchange. Che gives Indy the diamond and a poisoned drink; Indy gives Che the urn and drinks the drink, which is then revealed to be poisoned. Che offers the poison's antidote in exchange for returning the diamond. Indy gives him the diamond, but Che refuses to provide the antidote, even when Indy takes Willie hostage again. Indy's friend, Wu, holds the gangster at gunpoint, but Chen shoots and kills him amidst a bunch of champagne bottles popping to mask the gunshot. Indy impales Chen with a skewer of pigeon flambé in retaliation and a gunfight ensues. Indy, Short Round, and Willie escape with the antidote and leave Shanghai, unknowingly on a plane owned by Lao Che. Che orders the pilots to parachute out of the plane in hopes of killing Indy when the plane crashes, but Indy deploys a raft and lands safely on the ground.

In the Bantam novel Indiana Jones and the Dinosaur Eggs, Indiana meets Lao Che for the first time in 1933 at a nightclub he owns in Shanghai.

Before the death of Roy Chiao, Steven Spielberg was planning to return Che in Indiana Jones and the Kingdom of the Crystal Skull, but he declined the idea after Chiao's death in 1999. Ric Young, the actor that portrayed Kao Kan, expressed interest in reprising his role of Kan in the movie, but he declined after Roy's death.

=== Wu Han ===
Wu Han (David Yip) is an old friend of Indiana Jones who holds Lao Che and his sons at gunpoint during the meeting at Club Obi Wan. He is shot and killed by Lao's son Chen. Max McCoy's prequel novel Indiana Jones and the Dinosaur Eggs detailed how Wu first met Indiana in 1914, during his trip to China with his father. Years later, he is studying political science when his parents and sister die in an influenza outbreak. Their ashes wind up in the possession of Lao, who uses the promise of a proper burial to force Wu into servitude. In 1933, Indiana meets Wu in Shanghai on his way to Mongolia, and steals his family's ashes from Lao, securing his old friend's freedom. Indiana inspires him to study archaeology upon his return to school. Wu also aids Indiana in the 2003 video game Indiana Jones and the Emperor's Tomb, set just before Temple of Doom. He regularly arranges Jones's transportation.

=== Short Round ===
Short Round (Ke Huy Quan) is a 12-year-old taxicab driver in Shanghai. Short Round was orphaned when the Japanese bombed Shanghai in 1932; he helps Indiana escape from Lao Che.

He is essential in freeing Indiana and the Maharajah of Pankot from Mola Ram's psychic control. The novelization explains that Short Round was born Wan Li (Chinese: 萬麗) in 1924. Despite attending a Christian school, he respects Chinese mythology, and believes that the baby elephant that transports him in India is a reincarnation of his brother Chu. He immigrates to the United States with Jones following his adventure. In the film, Short Round is frequently heard speaking Cantonese (despite being born in Wu-speaking Shanghai), as well as English.

In an early script of Indiana Jones and the Kingdom of the Crystal Skull, called Indiana Jones and the Saucermen from Mars, written by Jeb Stuart, Short Round (now an adult) was set to appear in the wedding of Indy and Dr. Elaine McGregor, alongside Sallah, Marion Ravenwood, and Willie Scott, but the script was scrapped by George Lucas and Steven Spielberg.

Short Round was named after Temple of Doom screenwriters Willard Huyck and Gloria Katz's dog. Lucas's initial idea for Indiana's sidekick was a virginal young princess, but Huyck, Katz, and Spielberg disliked the idea. Around 6,000 actors auditioned worldwide for the part; Quan was cast after his brother auditioned for the role. Spielberg liked his personality, so he and Ford improvised the scene where Short Round accuses Indiana of cheating during a card game. Quan had a martial arts instructor to help him on set.

The character cameoed in an issue of Marvel Comics' The Further Adventures of Indiana Jones, rescuing Indiana from a pirate attack in the Caribbean, before he returns to boarding school. The Lost Journal of Indiana Jones, published in 2008, detailed Short Round becoming an archaeologist and tracking down the Peacock's Eye (the diamond seen in Indiana Jones and the Temple of Doom 's opening sequence) to Niihau.

He also appeared in the non-canonical crossover story in Star Wars Tales, where he and Indiana discover the remains of Han Solo in the crashed Millennium Falcon in the Pacific Northwest. A Short Round action figure was planned by LJN in 1984, but was never released. Hasbro has since produced two Short Round action figures in different sizes. However, an unpainted metal miniature of him was released by TSR that year. He appears in the 2009 Lego sets Shanghai Chase and The Temple of Doom.

Empire named Short Round as their sixteenth favorite element of the films, explaining "you could argue that Shortie is the real hero of Temple of Doom – while the titular relic hunter is off searching for fortune and glory, it's Short Round's moral compass that keeps the adventure on the right track". In 2008, a poll conducted by movietickets.com to coincide with the release of Kingdom of the Crystal Skull named Short Round "favorite Indy sidekick".

=== Chattar Lal ===
Chattar Lal (Roshan Seth) is the Prime Minister of Pankot and personal representative and chief advisor of Maharaja Zalim Singh. He graduated from Oxford and speaks English with a pronounced accent as a result, and also knows well Indiana's reputation. Like Indiana, he was apparently forced to drink the Blood of Kali by Mola Ram, thereby controlling him, as was the young Maharaja. During the attempted sacrifice of Willie Scott, Lal is injured by Indiana when he gets caught in the wheel used to lower victims into the lava pit. He is last seen crawling away and collapsing but disappears after this. It is unknown if he escaped.

In an early script of the film, Lal was set to have a more important role, but the script was rejected. In another early script, Lal was intended to be killed by Indy throwing him into the lava pit, but the script was scrapped.

In the novelization, Chattar Lal is thrown into the lava pit while in the film he is injured but apparently does not die, whereas in Lego Indiana Jones: The Original Adventures, he is blown apart by a blast of heat caused by Indy and Short Round.

=== Zalim Singh ===
Maharajah Zalim Singh (Raj Singh, voice dubbed by Katie Leigh) is the ruler of Pankot State. He is a young boy, probably a year or two older than Short Round. Despite considering the Thuggee an evil cult and vowing that they would never return, it is revealed that Singh is an unwilling member, having been forced to drink the Blood of Kali. During Indiana's fight against the chief Thuggee guard, Singh hinders Indiana by using a voodoo doll. He is stopped by Short Round, who burns him with a torch, releasing him from the Black Sleep of Kali. He atones for his crimes by telling Short Round how he, Indiana, and Willie can escape from the mines. He also apparently alerts British troops about the recent events, as he is seen among them when they arrive to battle the Thuggee after Mola Ram's death.

In an early script of the film, Singh was set to have a more important role, but the script was scrapped.

=== Mola Ram ===
Mola Ram holding a human heart as part of a sacrifice to Kali

Mola Ram (मौला राम “Lord Rama”, portrayed by Amrish Puri) is the Thuggee high priest and main antagonist of Indiana Jones and the Temple of Doom. He has made Pankot Palace his lair and wants to use the five Sankara Stones to set up the reign of Kali. To that end, Mola Ram enslaves the children of a village that had one of the Stones (the taking of it bringing his total to three). They mine for the other two and for gems to fund his cause in catacombs underneath the palace. He also brainwashes people, including local politicians and royalty, with the "blood of Kālī Ma"—a magic potion—to make them devout followers (unless they are exposed to extreme pain, such as a burn). He forces Indy to drink the Blood of Kali, thinking that he could use Indy's archaeological skills to find other power artifacts in the world to bolster the Thuggee cult's power. He tries to get Indy to sacrifice Willie Scott as an act of supreme cruelty, but Short Round frees Indy of Kali's curse, Willie is rescued, and Mola Ram escapes through a hidden trap door under the Kali altar. Indiana eventually confronts Mola Ram over a nearby gorge, calling on the power of Shiva to use the Stones against the evil cleric, who is burned by one of them and falls into the river, where he is devoured by crocodiles. In the novelization, Ram's death is the same, but he returns to normal when he burns his hand on the stone; Indy tries to pull him to safety, but Ram falls to his death.

Lucas wanted Mola Ram to be terrifying, so Huyck and Katz added elements of Aztec and Hawaiian human sacrificers, and European devil worship, to the character. To create his headdress, make-up artist Tom Smith based the skull on a cow (as this would be sacrilegious to Hinduism) with a latex shrunken head. Puri was chosen as Spielberg and Lucas did not want to cast a European actor and apply dark make-up. In the role, Puri resembles Eduardo Ciannelli, who played Thuggee cult leader in Gunga Din, the main inspiration for the film.

In an early script of the movie, the burning Sankara Stones actually release Mola Ram from the same "Black Sleep of the Kali Ma" he inflicts on Jones before falling to his death, hinting that he may not have been in control of his actions. It was also intended that Mola Ram, after falling from the bridge, be killed by landing on the embankment below, followed by the crocodiles tearing apart his corpse. However, this script was scrapped and rejected.

A 6-inch (15 cm) action figure and an unpainted metal miniature of Mola Ram was released in 1984. In 2008, Hasbro released several Mola Ram items as part of their Indiana Jones toy line, including a 3.75-inch (9.5 cm) action figure, an Adventure Heroes figure, and a Mighty Muggs figure. A "One Coin" (caricature) figure of Mola, standing 1.97-inch (5.0 cm) was released in Japan in 2008.

=== Chief Guard ===
The Chief Guard (Pat Roach) is the ruthless, coldhearted commander of Mola Ram's Thuggee guards who also helped oversee the enslaved children in the mines that were under Pankot Palace in 1935. After releasing the children from the mines, Indy fought the chief on a conveyor belt leading to a rock crusher. Indy escaped, but the guard's sash became caught in the crusher's gears and he was dragged in and crushed to death.

=== Captain Phillip Blumburtt ===
Captain Phillip Blumburtt (Philip Stone) is a British Indian Army officer who commands troops of the 11th Poona Rifles. He is frequently sent to inspect Pankot Palace on behalf of the British government. He is alerted to the evil of Pankot Palace apparently by the young Maharajah to deal with the remaining Thuggees, whom Blumburtt's men kill so Indy and Willie can escape.

In an early draft of the film, Blumburtt was set to have a more important role, but the draft was rejected.

David Niven was considered to play the role of Blumburtt, but died before production, so Stone, who had appeared in three Stanley Kubrick films, was cast instead.

== Introduced in The Last Crusade ==
=== Herman Mueller ===
Herman Mueller (J. J. Hardy) is Indiana's fellow Boy Scout in the 1912 prologue, who brings Indiana to the Sheriff's attention after his battle with outlaws for the Cross of Coronado. He reappears as Indiana's sidekick in the English and French Young Indiana Jones novels, which introduces his archaeologist father Herman Senior.

=== Garth ===
Garth, also known as Fedora (Richard Young), is a treasure hunter and archeologist, who appears in the 1912 prologue. Garth is the leader of a treasure hunter gang who find the Cross of Coronado in a cave deep in present day Arches National Park. The Cross is stolen by a teenage Jones who uses his Boy Scout horse to get away. Garth and his men pursue Jones by car and follow him on a train. Garth, showing a good side for a brief period of time, saves Jones' life when Jones falls into a car carrying a lion, but then tries to reclaim the cross. Jones escapes with the cross with help from a magician's caboose, and runs home, with Garth smiling in admiration for Jones' courage and knowledge. However, Garth and the gang get the Moab sheriff on their side and Jones is told to give the cross back. Garth, however, consoles Jones, admiring the young man's attempts to claim it. He then gives Jones his fedora before walking out.

In an early draft of the film, Fedora was intended to be Dr. Abner Ravenwood, but the draft was rejected and scrapped.

=== Henry Jones, Sr. ===
Dr. Henry Walton Jones, Sr. (Sean Connery) is Indiana's estranged father, who was distant from his son due to his obsessive study of the Holy Grail and its possible location. Captured by Nazis in 1938, he is rescued by his son, and in the process of racing the Nazis to the Grail's location, they become closer. Alex Hyde-White stood in for Connery in the film's 1912 prologue, and the character was played by Lloyd Owen in The Young Indiana Jones Chronicles, which showed his anger at his son running away to fight in World War I. He also appeared in the Young Indiana Jones novels and the graphic novel Indiana Jones and the Spear of Destiny (set in 1945). At the time of the events of Indiana Jones and the Kingdom of the Crystal Skull in 1957, it appears the elder Dr. Jones has already died in 1951.

=== Walter Donovan ===
Foreground: Vogel (left), Donovan (right). Background: Elsa Schneider

Walter Donovan (Julian Glover) is an American businessman who desires the Holy Grail in order to achieve immortality and the main antagonist of Indiana Jones and the Last Crusade. He secretly works with the Nazis, and sends both Indiana and his father on the search for the Grail without their knowledge of his ties to Nazi Germany. He fatally shoots Henry in order to force Indy to clear the traps for him. After Indy does so, Donovan and Elsa follow him into a room filled with cups, one of which is the Grail. Donovan remarks that he is not a historian so cannot know what the true grail looks like. Elsa purposely chooses a false grail – a bejeweled gold cup – for Donovan, who falls for her deception, remarking that it "certainly is the cup of the King of Kings". When he drinks from the false grail, he ages so rapidly that his body crumbles to a skeleton and then dust in seconds.

Glover enjoyed playing the part because of the character's ambiguous nature:

"What would you do, if you had the chance of having eternal life? That's quite a question. Where would you draw the line? People say [Donovan] was a Nazi, he wasn't a Nazi, he joined the Nazi Party in order to investigate its property, and he bloody nearly got that. Only because he was greedy did he [fall]. This is an advice for you [the viewer]: always choose the pewter cup. It applies to everything. An allegory for life."

In an early script of the film, Donovan's surname was set to be Walter Chandler, and he was set to die in Hatay, when the Nazi tank falls off a cliff (a fate that would later go to Ernst Vogel), but the script was changed. The character of Walter Donovan was partially based on Irish American businessman and politician Joseph P. Kennedy Sr., father of the 35th President of the United States John F. Kennedy. Kennedy Sr. was the United States Ambassador to Great Britain during the 1930s and was known for his advocacy of isolationism and appeasement towards the Third Reich. It has also been suggested that the character was partly inspired by William Rhodes Davis. Davis was an American businessman who assisted the Nazis in acquiring an oil supply before World War II.

Isla Blair, Glover's wife, cameoed as Mrs. Donovan in the scene where he and Indiana discuss the Holy Grail. The in-joke was conceived by one of the producers.

=== Panama Hat ===
Panama Hat (Tim Hiser and Paul Maxwell) is a minor villain who appears in the prologue of the film. In 1912, he hired grave robbers to dig up the Cross of Coronado, which is immediately stolen by a teenage Jones. A horse chase and pursuit on board a circus train follow. Indy escapes, returns to his home, and attempts to talk to his father, who rebuffs him. The Sheriff arrives with Panama Hat's men, and Indy is forced to give the Cross back. Panama Hat is seen taking back the cross and handing a stack of money to the gang.

In 1938, Jones steals the Cross again, this time on a ship, but is caught. He struggles with the villain's men and gets the cross back. Indy jumps off the ship as a giant fuel drum rolls wildly, falling directly onto a crate of TNT. The crate explodes, causing the entire ship to blow and seemingly killing Panama Hat and his crew, with the former's shredded hat floating past Jones.

In the novelization of the story, it is stated that Indiana's final showdown with Panama Hat began because he got word from a worker of the villain that his boss had an affair with his wife and he wanted revenge. Jones realized it was a set-up and was told by Panama Hat that he had been hit badly by the Great Depression and was auctioning off the cross to wealthy buyers. He got one deal from a buyer with a provision that said he had to kill Jones. Indy would later suspect the buyer was Walter Donovan.

=== Elsa Schneider ===
Dr. Elsa Schneider (Alison Doody) is the secondary antagonist of Indiana Jones and the Last Crusade and an Austrian archaeologist, who desires the Grail and like Donovan, she keeps her involvement with the Nazis a secret. She is revealed to have seduced both Joneses, Henry first and then Indiana, but it is implied that she is more fond of the latter. Later, she deliberately picks a false grail for Donovan as revenge after he shoots Henry and watches him decay into a skeleton before her eyes. Afterwards, she crosses the temple's seal with the Grail, causing the temple to collapse and her to drop the Grail, as well as nearly falling into a chasm. Indy catches her, but she sees the Grail on a shelf of rock and greedily reaches for it despite Indy's warnings. Her hand that Indy is holding slips out of its leather glove, causing her to fall to her death. According to Doody, Elsa's role as a femme fatale was an attempt to distance the character from Willie Scott.

In an early script of the film, Elsa was going to be the one who shot Henry Jones Sr. in the Holy Grail Temple, and she was set to die after drinking from the false Grail — a fate that later went to Walter Donovan — but the script was changed.

IGN placed Elsa 33rd on their list of the best bad girls in film in 2008, while Empire noted Doody "achieved the unlikely feat of making a Nazi sympathiser sympathetic".

=== Kazim ===
Kazim (Kevork Malikyan) is the leader of the Brotherhood of the Cruciform Sword, an ancient organization protecting the secrets of the Holy Grail. Kazim initially attempts to kill Indy and Elsa by setting fire to the petroleum-soaked waters of the Venice catacombs in which they are searching for clues to the Grail. After Indy and Elsa escape the catacombs, Kazim and his men chase them in speedboats and try to gun them down. Indy reluctantly saves Kazim from being cut to pieces in a boat engine propeller, and Kazim reveals his father's location after learning that Indy has no interest in finding the Grail. Kazim is later killed while leading an attack on a Nazi convoy closing in on the Grail. It was originally intended that when Kazim died, Elsa would step away and see her hands covered in blood (as a homage to The Man Who Knew Too Much), but Spielberg was unsatisfied with each take. Malikyan was once in the running for the part of Sallah in the first film, but traffic made him late to the audition.

In the early script of the film, written by Jeffrey Boam, Kazim was set to be an agent of Hatay, named Kemal, seeking the Holy Grail and an ally of the Nazis. Also, he was set to die after drinking from the False Grail (a fate that which would later go to Walter Donovan), but the script was rejected and changed.

=== Vogel ===
Standartenführer Ernst Vogel (Michael Byrne), also known as Herr Oberst (German for (Mister) Colonel), is an SS officer who aids Donovan in finding the Holy Grail. His main objective is to kill the Joneses — whom he hates because Indy killed three of his men in Castle Grünwald — on direct orders from Adolf Hitler. Vogel discovers Jones Sr. on a German Zeppelin bound for Athens, but Indiana throws Vogel out the window just as the Zeppelin is taking off. Later, Vogel and Donovan are heading towards the location of the Grail when Indiana ambushes their convoy. Indy and Vogel struggle on the back of a tank until Indy pins Vogel's arm behind his back and proceeds to hammer his face into the turret, before the tank goes over a cliff. Vogel is killed in the ensuing crash when the tank lands on the sharp rocks below, with the turret that he was gripping crushing him as it broke off of the tank's frame and rolled over his body several times.

In the early scripts of the movie, Vogel actually makes it to the Holy Grail Temple, and was set to be killed by getting crushed by a rock while trying to steal the Grail. Later, his death was changed to that of being beheaded by the Holy Grail Temple's traps (a fate that which would later go to a Hatayan soldier), but the scripts were changed.

Julian Glover was the original choice to portray Vogel, but Robert Watts suggested him for Walter Donovan's role.

=== Grail Knight ===
The Grail Knight (Robert Eddison) was the youngest knight of three brothers set out to find the Holy Grail. In the late eleventh century, he and his two brothers (Richard and a third sibling) became Knights of the First Crusade. During their journeys in the Holy Land, they discovered the Holy Grail and protected it at the Temple of the Sun in the Canyon of the Crescent Moon for 150 years, using the Grail's power to extend their lifespans. As the bravest and most worthy, he was chosen to remain as the Grail's sole guardian while his two brothers traveled back to Europe, leaving behind two markers leading to the Grail's location. The Knight lived in a side chamber off of the inner sanctuary of the Temple of the Sun. In time, a cult of protectors, the Knights of the Cruciform Sword, formed around the presence of the Grail, but it is not known whether these people knew about the Knight.

In 1938, Indy enters the sanctuary. There the knight tries to fight him to determine who should protect the grail but falls from the weight of his own sword. Gracious in defeat, the knight tries to pass on the responsibility of protecting the grail to Jones, but is interrupted by the arrival of Walter Donovan and Elsa Schneider. Donovan asks which of the cups is the Grail. The knight refuses to tell Donovan, saying instead that they must choose wisely as a final test, and also warning them that any of the false grails will take their lives. Donovan drinks from a golden jewel-encrusted grail, chosen for him by Elsa. He remarks that it "looks like the cup of the King of Kings", but it proves to be false and he crumbles into dust within seconds. The knight sympathetically says Donovan "chose poorly". Indy on the other hand selects a pewter grail (the cup of a carpenter) and is told he has "chosen wisely".

The knight warns them that if they take the Holy Grail past the great seal they will forfeit their immortality. Elsa Schneider ignores the warning and falls into a chasm created by an earthquake. The knight is last seen waving goodbye to Indy as the temple collapses, but is also relieved that the Grail is safe now that it is out of reach to anyone.

The role of the Grail Knight was originally intended for Laurence Olivier, but the actor was too ill to take part and died shortly after. In the early scripts of the film, the Grail Knight was set to fight with Indy, but the script was changed. However, this idea was used in the level "Temple of the Grail" of Lego Indiana Jones: The Original Adventures.

=== Havelock ===
Havelock (Larry Sanders) was the Scout Master of the Boy Scout troop in which Indiana Jones and Herman Mueller were members by 1912.

=== Adolf Hitler ===
Michael Sheard appears as Adolf Hitler, whom Jones briefly encounters at the book-burning rally in Berlin. Although a non-speaking role, Sheard could speak German and had already portrayed Hitler three times during his career.

=== Heinrich Himmler ===
In the book-burning scene, Ronald Lacey, who played Toht in the Raiders of the Lost Ark, cameos as Heinrich Himmler.

=== Sultan of Hatay ===
Flag of the sultan's armed forces. The Arabic text roughly translates to "His Highness's desert forces".

Alexei Sayle played the Sultan of Hatay.

== Introduced in The Young Indiana Jones Chronicles ==
=== Anna Jones ===
Anna Mary Jones (Ruth de Sosa) is the mother of Indiana Jones and the wife of Henry Jones Sr. Very little had been established about the character prior to production, so de Sosa was allowed to create many aspects of the character, in addition to the basics that had been established by Lucas.

In the series, Indiana is shown to have a strong relationship with his mother, whom he calls "the sweetest, smartest, most wonderful woman who ever lived". In the unaired episode "Florence, May 1908" (later released as part of The Adventures of Young Indiana Jones: The Perils of Cupid), Anna briefly has an affair with composer Giacomo Puccini. She also reveals she is from Virginia. Although it is explained she died of scarlet fever in the series, it is contradicted in new footage shot for the 1999 re-edit, where Indiana explains she died of influenza. In The Lost Journal of Indiana Jones, it is stated that Anna died on March 3, 1912, aged 33 years.

She was first mentioned in passing in Raiders of the Lost Ark; Indy remarks Brody "sound[s] just like my mother" when discussing the dangers of finding the Ark. In Indiana Jones and the Last Crusade, Indy's father Henry does mention that her death drove him and his son apart. Indy does believe that his mother "never understood" his father's obsession with the Holy Grail, though Henry says she supported him fully. In Indiana Jones and the Kingdom of the Crystal Skull, Indy indirectly mentions her, when he tells Mutt Williams (his son and her grandson) that people only get one mother and sometimes not for very long.

Previously, the 1989 computer game, Indiana Jones and the Last Crusade: The Graphic Adventure, came with a replica of Henry's diary which had named her Mary. More recent publications, such as the Lost Journal of Indiana Jones, rectify this by making Mary her middle name.

=== Susie Jones ===
Susie Jones was the sister of Indiana Jones, daughter of Anna and Henry Jones Sr., along with posthumous aunt of Mutt Williams and Sophie Jones. Indiana and Anna mention her in "Peking, March 1910" (later edited into Journey of Radiance), where Susie is implied to have died from poor health as a baby.

=== Frank ===
Frank (Stephen Graf) is the cousin of Indiana Jones, nephew of Henry Jones Sr., and son of Grace. He appears in the second half of Young Indiana Jones and the Curse of the Jackal, where he and Indiana go to Mexico, but get separated when Indy ends up meeting Pancho Villa. Frank's appearance was later edited into the second half of Spring Break Adventure, with Stephen Graf returning to shoot additional scenes for the bridging segments.

=== Grace Jones ===
Grace Jones (Deborah Strang) is the mother of Frank, aunt of Indiana Jones, and sister of Henry Jones Sr. She appears in Spring Break Adventure. The character was created for the bridging segments, when they edited "Princeton, February 1916" and the second half of Young Indiana Jones and the Curse of the Jackal together.

=== Remy Baudouin ===
Remy Baudouin (Ronny Coutteure) is a Belgian who becomes the comrade-in-arms and best friend to the young Indiana Jones during World War I. He meets the 16-year-old Indy in Mexico while fighting under Pancho Villa: he joined the Villistas because his Mexican wife Lupe had been murdered by the Federales. After seeing newsreel footage of the devastation of his country by the Germans in World War I, Remy resolves to return to Europe to join the Belgian army and defend his homeland, and Indy decides to join him. After fighting on the Western Front and being wounded, Remy wearies of life in the trenches and transfers with Indy to the Belgian forces fighting in Africa. They later transfer together to the secret service.

=== Helen Seymour ===
Miss Helen Seymour (Margaret Tyzack) is Indiana's tutor during his father's worldwide lecture tour from 1908 to 1910. Miss Seymour had taught Henry Jones, Sr. at the University of Oxford. In one of the final episodes broadcast in 1996, she dies just before Indiana returns to visit her in Oxford after the war has ended. Her maid gives him her final letter, in which she urges him to finish his education and reconcile with his father.

In a comic book adaptation of the first episode, it is explained she dislikes her old classmate T. E. Lawrence due to their divided religious beliefs (her father was a minister). Seymour also appears in three books based on the series. In one, she inherits a fortune, and is courted by a Colonel (whom Indiana is suspicious of) aboard the RMS Titanic.

=== T. E. Lawrence ===
A fictionalized version of T. E. Lawrence has a recurring role in the series. He first appeared in the pilot episode, Young Indiana Jones and the Curse of the Jackal, and appears or is mentioned multiple times throughout the series. Lawrence is portrayed by Joseph Bennett and Douglas Henshall.

=== Demetrios / Claw ===
Demetrios (Vic Tablian) is a Greek demolitions expert, who later becomes an arms dealer in Mexico. He appeared in the pilot episode, Young Indiana Jones and the Curse of the Jackal, where Indiana Jones encounters Demetrios, while visiting an archeological dig in Egypt, in 1908. Demetrios murders a man, and steals an Egyptian jackal headpiece. Indiana encounters Demetrios (then known as "Claw", having lost one of his hands) again, while Indiana rides with Pancho Villa in 1916. Demetrios sells arms to Pancho Villa, while also selling information to General Pershing. Indiana confronts Demetrios, who is still in possession of the Jackal headpiece. Demetrios tries to kill Indiana, but is himself killed in an explosion, while Indiana gets away with the Jackal headpiece. Demetrios' encounters with Indiana Jones were later edited into the films My First Adventure and Spring Break Adventure. Demetrios was portrayed by Vic Tablian, who had previously portrayed Barranca and the Monkey Man in Raiders of the Lost Ark. All three of Tablian's characters attempts to kill Indiana Jones.

=== Pancho Villa ===
A fictionalized version of Pancho Villa. He appears in the second half of the episode Young Indiana Jones and the Curse of the Jackal (later edited into the second half of the film Spring Break Adventure), where he encounters a 16-year-old Indiana Jones in Mexico. Indy mentions this encounter in the 2008 film Indiana Jones and the Kingdom of the Crystal Skull. Pancho Villa was played by actor Mike Moroff.

=== Frederick Selous ===
A fictionalized version of Frederick Selous. He first appears in the episode "British East Africa, September 1909" (later edited into the first half of the film version Passion for Life). He returns in the episode Young Indiana Jones and the Phantom Train of Doom, where Indiana Jones is reunited with Selous, upon arriving in Africa in 1916. In Young Indiana Jones and the Phantom Train of Doom, Selous is a Captain with the 25th (Frontiersmen) Battalion, Royal Fusiliers (as was the real Frederick Selous). In both of his appearances, Selous is portrayed by Paul Freeman, who had played Dr. René Emile Belloq in Raiders of the Lost Ark.

=== Princess Sophie of Hohenberg ===
A fictionalized version of Princess Sophie of Hohenberg. She appears in the episode "Vienna, November 1908" (later edited into the first half of the film The Perils of Cupid). Sophie becomes the first love of a then 9-year-old Indiana Jones. She becomes the first girl that he ever kisses, but he is forbidden from seeing her further. Before they are separated, Sophie gives Indiana a locket with her picture in it. Indiana can be seen wearing the locket from "Princeton, February 1916" (Spring Break Adventure) all the way up to Young Indiana Jones and the Hollywood Follies (set in 1920). In the original broadcast version of "Vienna, November 1908", Old Indy references having encountered her later in life. Sophie was portrayed by Danish actress Amalie Ihle Alstrup. However, for the episode "German East Africa, December 1916" (edited into Oganga, the Giver and Taker of Life), a photograph of the real Sophie of Hohenberg was used for Indiana's locket.

=== Giacomo Puccini ===
A fictionalized version of Giacomo Puccini. He appears in the episode "Florence, May 1908" (later edited into the second half of the film The Perils of Cupid). Puccini becomes infatuated with Anna, Indy's mother, and pursues her romantically. Puccini asks Anna to run away with him. However, in the end, Anna makes the choice to stay with her husband and son. In the original broadcast version of "Florence, May 1908", it is implied that Puccini based his opera 1910 La fanciulla del West on his affair with Anna Jones. Giacomo Puccini was portrayed by Georges Corraface.

=== Nancy Stratemeyer ===
Nancy Stratemeyer (Robyn Lively) is Indiana Jones' high school sweetheart. Nancy is a fictional daughter of Edward Stratemeyer (the creator of Nancy Drew). Nancy first appears in the episode "Princeton, February 1916", where she and Indiana investigates a theft from Thomas Edison. Nancy returns in the TV movie Young Indiana Jones: Travels with Father, where she is reunited with Indiana, after he returns home from World War I in 1919. She is shown to have married Indiana's old high school rival, Butch, and have a son with him. Nancy's appearances were later edited into the films Spring Break Adventure and Winds of Change. Indiana mentions her in Tales of Innocence.

=== Maggie Lemass ===
Maggie Lemass (Susannah Doyle) is a young Irish woman, and the sister of Seán Lemass, whom Indiana Jones encounters in "Ireland, April 1916" (later edited into the first half of the film Love's Sweet Song). Indiana becomes infatuated with Maggie, who believes Indy to be an American millionaire. Indy's infatuation with her fades quickly, with him not enjoying her company.

=== Vicky Prentiss ===
Vicky Prentiss (Elizabeth Hurley as a young woman, Jane Wyatt as an old woman) is an English suffragette, whom Indiana Jones encounters in "London, May 1916" (later edited into the second half of the film Love's Sweet Song). Indy falls for Vicky, and wants to marry her, but she turns him down (not wanting to give up her freedom). Indiana mentions Vicky in "Paris, October 1916" (edited into Demons of Deception), the film Tales of Innocence, and "Istanbul, September 1918" (edited into Masks of Evil). In the original broadcast version of "London, May 1916", Vicky is reunited with a 93-year-old Indiana Jones in 1992.

=== Emile ===
Emile (Jason Flemyng) was a Belgian soldier, serving in the same unit as Indiana Jones in 1916. Emile appears in the episodes "Somme, Early August 1916" and "Germany, Mid-August 1916" (which were later edited together into the feature-length film Trenches of Hell). Emile fights alongside Indiana in the trenches, with the two ending up as prisoners of war. Emile steals the uniforms (and identities) of two deceased French officers (having heard that officers are treated better in POW camps) for himself and Indiana. Now "Captain Francois Toussaint" (Emile) and "Lieutenant Pierre Blanc" (Indiana), Emile and Indiana were sent to a POW camp for officers. They joined the other prisoners in an escape attempt, but Emile was shot and killed during the escape, while Indiana was punished (both for his own escape attempt, and the multiple escape attempts of the real Pierre Blanc) with a transfer to the Dusterstadt POW camp.

=== Mata Hari ===
A fictionalized version of Mata Hari. She appears in the episode "Paris, October 1916" (later edited into the second half of the film Demons of Deception), penned by Carrie Fisher. Mata enters into a sexual relationship with Indiana Jones (taking his virginity), during his brief stay in Paris. Mata Hari was portrayed by Domiziana Giordano.

=== Birdy Soames ===
Birdy Soames (Freddie Jones) is a former merchant marine and lighthouse keeper, who appears in Young Indiana Jones and the Phantom Train of Doom, and is a member of the 25th (Frontiersmen) Battalion, Royal Fusiliers during World War I. Freddie Jones was the father of actor Toby Jones, who later portrayed Basil Shaw in Indiana Jones and the Dial of Destiny.

=== Richard Meinertzhagen ===
A fictionalized version of Richard Meinertzhagen. He is introduced in Young Indiana Jones and the Phantom Train of Doom, where he assigns a group from 25th (Frontiersmen) Battalion, Royal Fusiliers (along with Indiana Jones, who've been tricked into tagging along) to destroy a German train in East Africa. Upon their success, he assigns them to capture German Colonel Paul von Lettow-Vorbeck. Indiana Jones encounters Meinertzhagen again in Daredevils of the Desert (an extended version of unaired episode "Palestine, October 1917"), where Meinertzhagen gives Indiana a spy mission to Beersheba (in preparation of the Battle of Beersheba). Richard Meinertzhagen was portrayed by Julian Firth. Prior to being cast as Richard Meinertzhagen, Firth had portrayed Lambert in the episode "Germany, Mid-August 1916" (later edited into the second half of Trenches of Hell).

=== Margarete Trappe ===
A fictionalized version of Margarete Trappe. Margarete encounters Indiana Jones in Young Indiana Jones and the Phantom Train of Doom, while she is in the service of German Colonel Paul von Lettow-Vorbeck in East Africa. A group from the 25th (Frontiersmen) Battalion, Royal Fusiliers (which includes Indiana, Remy Baudouin, and the former lover of Margarate's mother Frederick Selous) captures Margarete, and keeps her tied up and gagged in the back of their wagon. And, later, in a hidden compartment (when they permit themselves to be captured by the Germans in order to get close to Colonel von Lettow-Vorbeck). Margarete manages to break free, and raises the alarm, but the Royal Fusiliers manage themselves to escape with von Lettow-Vorbeck as their prisoner. With the only other pilot available at the German camp taken out, Margarete herself goes after Indiana and Remy (who are traveling with von Lettow-Vorbeck on board a hot air balloon), in a small plane. She shoots down their balloon, and lands her plane. When Indiana threatens to shoot von Lettow-Vorbeck (who is trying to escape to the approaching German army), Margarete threatens to shoot Indiana. However, she finds herself in the aim of Remy's rifle. With no other choice, Indiana lets Margarete and von Lettow-Vorbeck return to the German army, while he and Remy escapes the approaching German army. Margarete Trappe was portrayed by Lynsey Baxter.

=== Manfred von Richthofen ===
A fictionalized version of Manfred von Richthofen (The Red Baron). He is a recurring antagonist of Indiana Jones in Young Indiana Jones and the Attack of the Hawkmen. During their first encounter, Indy jokingly asks the German pilots why they do not paint their planes red. Indy's remark inspires Richthofen to give his plane a paint job, giving Richthofen's plane its iconic look. Manfred von Richthofen was portrayed by Marc Warren.

=== Marcello ===
Marcello (Terry Jones) is an Italian intelligence agent, whom Indiana Jones encounters in "Barcelona, May 1917" (later edited into the first half of Espionage Escapades). Prior to being a spy, Marcello was a tailor, and he regards himself as a master of disguise. In addition to playing Marcello, Terry Jones directed the episode.

=== Nadia Kamenevsky ===
Nadia Kamenevsky (Amanda Ooms) is an American intelligence agent, posing as a Russian ballerina, whom Indiana Jones encounters in "Barcelona, May 1917" (later edited into the first half of Espionage Escapades). Indiana, working alongside three other Allied agents, at first believes Nadia to only be a Russian ballet dancer, who is the lover of German cultural attache Schmidt. When Indiana and his co-workers set together a plot, to make it appear that Schmidt is having an affair with a married countess (thus disrupt allegiances in the city), Nadia discovers what they are doing. She attempts to alert Schmidt, but is captured by Indiana before she call tell him. Indiana leaves Nadia tied up and gagged in a closet, but he soon lets her out to give her food. When he removes the gag, an angry Nadia calls him an idiot, and threatens to have him thrown out of the espionage corps. She reveals herself to be an American agent, and that Schmidt is actually the most important double agent working for the Americans. She and Schmidt had only pretended to be lovers, as part of their cover story. After Indiana, and the other Allied agents, confirms Nadia's story, she joins forces with them to set their blunder right. Nadia manages to prevent the death of Schmidt, in a duel, in the last minute. Her true name is unknown. When she reveals herself to be an American spy, she tells Indiana "I'm no more Russian than you are!". Earlier in the story, Sergei Diaghilev explains to Indy (whom he gives the name "Igor") that he cannot afford to bring actual Russian dancers with him to Barcelona. Instead, he hires dancers from other countries (three of the ballet girls reveals themselves as actually being English, Italian, and French), gives them Russian stage names and have them pretend to be Russians (thus creating the illusion of the dancers being composed entirely of Russians).

=== Maya ===
Maya (Catherine Zeta-Jones) is an Arab spy, posing as a belly-dancer, whom Indiana Jones is partnered with in Daredevils of the Desert (an extended version of unaired episode "Palestine, October 1917"). Indiana gets close to her, but she ultimately reveals herself to be a Turkish double-agent.

=== Schiller ===
Schiller (Daniel Craig) is a German officer, who serves in Palestine during World War I. He appears in Daredevils of the Desert (an extended version of unaired episode "Palestine, October 1917"). During the Battle of Beersheba, Schiller attempts to blow up the wells of the city (depriving the enemy forces from access to water). Indiana Jones fights Schiller, and then shoots him to death, saving the wells.

=== Giulietta ===
Giulietta (Veronica Logan) is a young Italian woman, whom Indiana Jones dates in "Northern Italy, June 1918" (later edited into the first half of the film Tales of Innocence, with its plot moved to 1917). After Indy returns from a spy mission, he discovers that Ernest Hemingway has been moving in on her. Indy and Hemingway fight over Giulietta, until she reveals that she is going to marry another man named Alfredo (her childhood love). Giulietta's mother was portrayed by Pernilla August, who had played a different character in the episode "Vienna, November 1908".

=== Ernest Hemingway ===
A fictionalized version of Ernest Hemingway who appears in the episodes Young Indiana Jones and the Mystery of the Blues, Scandal of 1920, and "Northern Italy, June 1918" (later edited into the first half of the film Tales of Innocence, with its plot moved to 1917). In Young Indiana Jones and the Mystery of the Blues, Hemingway is a friend of Indy's in Chicago. "Northern Italy, June 1918" depicts their first encounter, while Hemingway is a Red Cross ambulance driver in Italy during World War I. In Scandal of 1920 he is shown attending the musical Indy is part of the production team for but they don't interact. Ernest Hemingway was portrayed by Jay Underwood.

=== Sofia ===
Sofia (Selina Giles) is an Italian nurse, whom Indiana Jones briefly gets involved with in the film Tales of Innocence. After Indy's injured during an air raid, Sofia is assigned to be his nurse. She is overjoyed when she gets to go with him to Venice. While there, the two seduce and make love to each other. Their romance is short-lived, as Indy is reassigned to Africa. A heartbroken Sofia has to remain in Venice, and says goodbye to him by the docks. The character was created for the bridging footage of Tales of Innocence.

=== Molly Walder ===
Molly Walder (Katherine Kendall) is an American teacher working in Istanbul, towards the end of World War I. She appears in the episode "Istanbul, September 1918" (later edited into the first half of the film Masks of Evil). Molly is dating a Swedish reporter named "Nils Anderson" (a cover for intelligence agent Indiana Jones), whom she becomes engaged to. However, upon learning the truth about "Nils"/Indiana, she feels betrayed. Later that day, Molly goes to see Indiana, but is mistaken for him by double-agent Stefan (Peter Firth), who shoots her. Indiana kills Stefan, and Molly dies in Indiana's arms.

=== Maria Straussler ===
Maria Straussler (Simone Bendix) is a woman working for American Intelligence in World War I. She appears in the unaired episode "Transylvania, January 1918" (later edited into the second half of the film Masks of Evil, with the events being moved towards the end of the war). Indiana meets Maria, when he is sent to Romania to investigate a Romanian General named Mattias Targo, together with American spy Colonel Waters (Keith Szarabajka). Maria reveals that she is engaged to French spy François Picard, one of the Allied agents previously sent to investigate Targo. She works with fellow Allied agents Nicholas Hunyadi and Dr. Franz Heinzer. Colonel Waters is reluctant to bring a woman with them, due to the danger involved. In response, Maria asks to borrow the Colonel's knife, which she reveals to have already picked from his pocket. She then proves herself an expert with knives, by throwing it within an inch of the Colonel's head. At Targo's castle, she is reunited with François (who has seemingly been turned into an undead by Targo, who is revealed to be a vampire), who exposes Dr. Heinzer as an Austrian double agent. Heinzer shoots François (seemingly killing him for a moment), which causes Maria to throw a knife into Heinzer's heart, killing him. Maria is captured by Targo, together with Indiana and Nicholas Hunyadi (whom Targo kills). Targo attempts to drug Maria, but she tricks him (only pretending to drink the drug), allowing her to save Indiana from Targo. She and Indiana later destroys Targo by driving a stake through his heart. An act that frees all the people under Targo's control, including François, leaving their dead bodies spread about. Afterwards, Maria and Indiana head back to their superiors in Venice. Unlike Dr. Heinzer (Austrian) and Nicholas Hunyadi (Romanian), Maria's nationality is never established. She has got a German-Swiss surname, works for American Intelligence, and is engaged to a Frenchman. The character is implied to be Romani.

=== General Mattias Targo ===
General Mattias Targo (Bob Peck) is a Romanian General during World War I, and a vampire, who might be Vlad the Impaler. He appears in the unaired episode "Transylvania, January 1918" (later edited into the second half of the film Masks of Evil, with the events being moved towards the end of the war). Targo is destroyed by Indiana Jones and Maria Straussler, who drive a stake through his heart.

=== Zyke ===
Zyke (Adrian Edmondson) was a German treasure hunter in 1918. He appeared in the TV movie Young Indiana Jones and the Treasure of the Peacock's Eye. Indiana Jones and Remy Baudouin first encounters Zyke in the last few minutes of World War I, while Zyke is attempting to acquire a map to the location of the Peacock's Eye (the diamond that Indiana wants from Lao Che, at the start of Indiana Jones and the Temple of Doom). Zyke is later murdered by bargirl Lily, who takes the box believed to contain the Peacock's Eye diamond.

=== Lily ===
Lily (Jayne Ashbourne) was a British bargirl on the island of Java. She appears in the TV movie Young Indiana Jones and the Treasure of the Peacock's Eye. Indiana Jones and Remy Baudouin first encountered Lily, when they were following treasure hunter Zyke to the hotel that Lily worked at. The next day, Lily was thrown out of town (implied to be because of prostitution), and onto the ship, that Indy and Remy were leaving on. Indy showed her kindness (the first that she had experienced in over a year, during which she had been miserable), and the two developed feelings for each other (though, Lily warned him about being seen with a woman like her). As Lily did not have a cabin of her own, Indy let her sleep in his bunk (while he shared Remy's). When the ship was robbed by pirates, Lily was revealed to have the box that Indy and Remy had been looking for. Lily claimed that Zyke had told her that they would be partners, but had tried to kill her, so she had killed him. Together with Indy and Remy, Lily followed the ship belonging to the pirates. She managed to get her hands on the box, but was shot by pirate captain Jin Ming. Indy tried to get Lily off the pirate ship, in a desperate effort to save her life, but she died in his arms. Lily's last words to Indy were: "Goodbye, my prince".

=== Jin Ming ===
Jin Ming (Alice Lau) was a Chinese pirate captain in 1918. She appears in the TV movie Young Indiana Jones and the Treasure of the Peacock's Eye. She is first introduced as a singer, on board a ship that Indiana Jones and Remy Baudouin travel on. After the ship has been attacked and captured by Chinese pirates, Jin revealed her true identity. Among the things that Jin's crew stole was a box, believed to contain the Peacock's Eye diamond. As a result, Indiana, Remy, and bargirl Lily followed the pirates to their ship. Jin shot and killed Lily, while she was trying to get away with the box. However, Jin was forced to flee with her crew after their ship caught fire, taking the box with them. Indiana and Remy followed them to a small island. The island quickly proved inhabited by killer natives, who attacked Jin's crew. Jin's crew did their best to shoot at the natives, but Jin was struck in the leg by a spear, and dropped the box (which Remy quickly grabbed). She was presumably killed by the natives, along with the rest of her crew.

=== Amy Wharton ===
Amy Wharton (Brooke Langton) is an American upper-class woman, whom Indiana Jones briefly dates in 1919. She appears in the film Winds of Change. Amy meets Indiana, when they both get on board a ship from France to the United States. They take a liking to each other during the journey, and start dating for the summer. Amy's mother dislikes the relationship, feeling that Indiana (who is from a different social class, and a former soldier) is not a suitable match for her. Indiana and Amy say goodbye to each other, when Indiana heads off to study archeology at University of Chicago, while Amy is heading to Vassar College (intending to become a medical doctor). As they say goodbye at the train station, they first promise to visit each other, then to write to each other, before admitting to each other that they will not.

=== Gray Cloud ===
Gray Cloud (Saginaw Grant), a friend and sidekick of Indiana Jones, circa 1950. He enlists Indy's help in 1950 when an ancient pipe is stolen from his tribe; a deadly chase through the snowy mountains of Wyoming ensues. Indy eventually retrieves the pipe for Gray Cloud.

=== Sidney Bechet ===
A fictionalized version of Sidney Bechet. He appears in Young Indiana Jones and the Mystery of the Blues and Young Indiana Jones and the Scandal of 1920. In the former, Bechet plays jazz at Big Jim Colosimo's restaurant, where he meets and befriends Indiana Jones (who works there as a waiter, while studying archeology at the University of Chicago). Sidney Bechet was portrayed by Jeffrey Wright.

=== Peggy Peabody ===
Peggy Peabody (Jennifer Stevens) is a singer who performed in George White's Scandals in 1920. She meet Indiana Jones, when they are both traveling by train to New York City. They take a liking to each other, but on Indiana's 21st birthday Peggy discovers that Indiana have two other girlfriends (in addition to her). Peggy joins forces with the other two, get back at Indiana, and dump him. Peggy appeared in the episode Young Indiana Jones and the Scandal of 1920.

=== Kate Rivers ===
Kate Rivers (Anne Heche) is a poet and newspaper critic, whom Indiana Jones meets and dates in the episode Young Indiana Jones and the Scandal of 1920. Kate and Indiana meet, while he is briefly living in New York City, and stays in the apartment next to Kate's. Kate is a member of the Algonquin Round Table, and brings Indiana to their meetings. On Indiana's 21st birthday Kate discovers that Indiana have two other girlfriends (in addition to her). Kate joins forces with the other two, get back at Indiana, and dump him.

=== Gloria Schuyler ===
Gloria Schuyler (Alexandra Powers) is a young socialite, whom Indiana Jones meets and dates in the episode Young Indiana Jones and the Scandal of 1920. When Gloria learns that Indiana's boss, George White, is struggling with the finance of his new Broadway show, Gloria contacts her father (a wealthy industrialist named J. J. Schuyler) and convinces him to help out. On Indiana's 21st birthday Gloria discovers that Indiana have two other girlfriends (in addition to her). Gloria joins forces with the other two, get back at Indiana, and dump him. In the TV movie Young Indiana Jones and the Hollywood Follies, Indiana is established to have been fired, due to having had three girlfriends at once (with one of them was the boss's daughter).

=== Claire Lieberman ===
Claire Lieberman (Allison Smith) is a Hollywood screenwriter, whom Indiana Jones meets and becomes involved with in the TV movie Young Indiana Jones and the Hollywood Follies. Claire is a writer on the Erich von Stroheim picture Foolish Wives, until Stroheim fires her for helping Indiana in trying to shut down the filming. However, Irving Thalberg assigns her to write another movie. Claire gets involved with Indiana, while also having a boyfriend named Tony, which upsets Indiana (the story takes place shortly after Young Indiana Jones and the Scandal of 1920, where Indiana himself had dated three women). Claire and Indiana departs on friendly terms, when he goes back to the University of Chicago.

=== John Ford ===
A fictionalized version of famed Western director John Ford. He appears in the TV movie Young Indiana Jones and the Hollywood Follies. He befriends Indiana Jones in 1920, after Indiana comes to Universal Pictures to shut down the runaway production of the Erich von Stroheim picture Foolish Wives. After Indiana fails, and gets fired (ending up stranded in Los Angeles, without the money for a ticket back to Chicago), Ford hires Indiana as his assistant for his upcoming film Six Steps to Hell (a fictional movie, though, potentially inspired by Ford's 1917 film Straight Shooting). When one of the lead actors is killed from a snake bite, Ford gives the actor's role to Indiana. After all of the film's stuntmen are injured, Ford asks Indiana to perform a dangerous stunt with a wagon, which Indiana requests $60 (most of Indiana's tuition at the University of Chicago) for. Ford agrees to his demand, and shoots the sequence (which resembles a famous stunt sequence in Ford's 1939 Western Stagecoach, and the truck stunt sequence in Raiders of the Lost Ark). John Ford was played by Stephen Caffrey.

=== Spike ===
Spike (Mark Auerbach) is the grandson of Indiana Jones, who appears in the bookends of the two-part episode "Young Indiana Jones and the Mystery of the Blues". Spike is an aspiring rock musician, who drives Indy, and the neighbors, crazy, with his band's practicing. When the episodes were re-edited into the Adventures of Young Indiana Jones movies, the bookends with Spike were dropped in favor of bookends with Harrison Ford (set in 1950). Spike is apparently the son of Sophie, who cameos at the end of the episode.

=== Sophie Jones ===
Sophie Jones (Susan Bigelow) is the daughter of Indiana Jones (the identity of her mother is never established), who appears in the bookends of the episodes "Ireland, April 1916", "Chicago, May 1920", and "Peking, March 1910" (played by a different actress). In the episode "Ireland, April 1916", it is established that she has a daughter named Lucy. Her appearance in "Chicago, May 1920" indicates that she is also the mother of Spike. It is unknown if she is the mother or aunt of Indy's other grandchild, the much older Caroline. "Chicago, May 1920" indicates that Sophie, and her children, live with Indiana in his house. The character's scenes were removed, when the episodes were re-edited into the Adventures of Young Indiana Jones movies (which deleted all old Indiana Jones bookends). The character still makes a cameo appearance in the comic book adaptation of "Peking, March 1910", and is referenced in the comic book adaptation of "Vienna, November 1908".

In Frank Darabont's script for Kingdom of the Crystal Skull, Indy and Marion were going to have a 13-year-old daughter (it is unknown if said daughter would have been a younger version of Sophie), but Spielberg objected to this idea, and the character of Mutt Williams was created instead. The bookends for "Vienna, November 1908" establishes that Indy has several children, making it possible that Sophie is simply Mutt's sister or half-sister (depending on whom her mother is). The Adventures of Young Indiana Jones films and the first four Harrison Ford movies shows Indiana Jones having multiple sexual partners for decades, starting with Mata Hari in 1916, before he marries Marion Ravenwood in 1957. When he is reunited with Marion in Kingdom of the Crystal Skull, Indiana admits to having been involved with "a few" women since he and Marion last saw each other in 1937.

=== Caroline Jones ===
Caroline Jones (Candy Aston) is the granddaughter of Indiana Jones. It is unknown who her grandmother was. It is also unknown if Caroline is the daughter of Mutt (conceived at some point before his death), Sophie, or another child of Indiana Jones (in bookends for "Vienna, November 1908", Old Indy references having multiple living children). Caroline is also the mother of Harry Jones, Indy's great-grandson. She appears in the episode "Peking, March 1910", where she attends a family Thanksgiving dinner with her grandfather. The character's scenes were removed, when the episodes were re-edited into the Adventures of Young Indiana Jones movies (which deleted all old Indiana Jones bookends). The character still appears in the comic book adaptation of "Peking, March 1910".

=== Harry Jones ===
Harry Jones (Jeremy Gerber) is the great-grandson of Indiana Jones, and son of Caroline Jones. He appears in the episode "Peking, March 1910", where he attends a family Thanksgiving dinner with his great-grandfather. The character's scenes were removed, when the episodes were re-edited into the Adventures of Young Indiana Jones movies (which deleted all old Indiana Jones bookends). The character still appears in the comic book adaptation of "Peking, March 1910".

=== Annie Jones ===
Annie Jones (Joy Miller) is the great-granddaughter of Indiana Jones. She appears in the episode "Peking, March 1910", where she attends a family Thanksgiving dinner with her great-grandfather. It is unknown if Annie is the daughter of Caroline Jones, or another of the adults at the dinner. The character's scenes were removed, when the episodes were re-edited into the Adventures of Young Indiana Jones movies (which deleted all old Indiana Jones bookends). The character still appears in the comic book adaptation of "Peking, March 1910".

== Introduced in Kingdom of the Crystal Skull ==
=== Mac ===
George "Mac" McHale (Ray Winstone) is an anti-hero who is a friend with Jones. He is a spin on Sallah, Belloq and Elsa. Mac served in MI6 during World War II, working with Indiana (who worked for the Office of Strategic Services). Writer David Koepp said Mac represents the confusion of the Cold War, with Winstone concurring "figuring out who you were working for and who you were working against must have been crazy". Mac's look was inspired by a photo of Ernest Hemingway wearing boots, so Winstone was told to tuck his pants into his boots and "rock" them throughout the film. Mac calls himself a "capitalist", and frequently makes his decision based upon what he gets in return. Mac is also extremely greedy, enthusiastic to accompany Indy to Akator, a "city of gold", and expresses clear frustration when Akator does not turn out to be what he expected, calling the venture a "waste of [his] time." Mac is eventually sucked into a vortex created by aliens to another dimension. It is not clear whether Mac died after being sent to the dimension.

Mac reappeared in the novel Indiana Jones and the Army of the Dead. Set after the second World War, he and Indiana battle German and Japanese agents, a voodoo priest and legions of the undead for the Heart of Darkness, an object made of pearl and ebony in Haiti.

=== Irina Spalko ===
Colonel Doctor Irina Spalko (Cate Blanchett) is a Soviet agent born in a small village in the eastern regions of the Ukrainian Soviet Socialist Republic, she was believed by those in her village to be a witch as her apparent psychic powers began to manifest themselves through animal control. She is skilled in fencing and hand-to-hand combat and is Indiana's main antagonist as she brings the crystal skull to Akator to utilize the power there as part of the Soviet Union's experiments in mind control. Her desire for knowledge proved her undoing when the crystal skull entity grants her desire to know everything, overloading her mind and causing her to disintegrate as her scattered essence is teleported to another dimension.

Frank Marshall said Spalko continued the tradition of Indiana having a love–hate relationship "with every woman he ever comes in contact with". Blanchett had wanted to play a villain for a "couple of years" before being cast. Spalko was modeled on Marlene Dietrich, while her bob cut was George Lucas' idea and was inspired by Louise Brooks.

In an early script of the film, Spalko was set to fight with Williams in a real virgin jungle, but the idea was scrapped because of the risks.

Uma Thurman was considered for the role of Spalko, but she declined.

=== Antonin Dovchenko ===
Colonel Antonin Dovchenko (Igor Jijikine) leads a company of Soviet soldiers to aid Spalko on the quest for the crystal skull. He is ruthless and despises weakness. Dovchenko is large in stature and a brutal hand-to-hand combatant. The character is a tribute to the muscular henchman Pat Roach played in the first three films. He fights Indiana several times until Indy finally beats him and his dazed body gets carried off and eaten alive by siafu ants in the jungle. Hasbro released 3.75-inch (95 mm) and 12-inch (300 mm) action figures as well as an Adventure Heroes model, and is available in two Lego playsets.

=== General Ross ===
General Bob Ross (Alan Dale) was an American general whom Indiana Jones befriended during the second World War. In 1957, after Jones was coerced by Soviet agents to find alien remains in Hangar 51, he was trapped in Doom Town and barely survived. During his subsequent interrogation by FBI agents Smith and Taylor, General Ross arrived and vouched for Jones, insisting that he was not someone who would side with the Communists. Later, when Mac revealed to Jones during a chase through the Amazon jungle that he was a double agent working for the CIA, he mentioned that General Ross was his control agent, and he had secretly contacted him to bail Jones out of the aftermath of the Hangar 51 intrusion. However, its unclear if this was the truth as Mac later admitted to lying about being a double-agent though its possible he really might've called Ross to help Jones out. Ross later attended Indiana's wedding to Marion Ravenwood.

=== Dean Charles Stanforth ===
Dean Charles Stanforth (Jim Broadbent) is Indiana's friend at Marshall College. The character replaces Marcus Brody following Denholm Elliott's death in 1992. Stanforth resigns to protect Indy from government agents who want him on trumped up Communist charges, and is later reinstated, with Indy joining him as the Associate Dean.

=== Mutt Williams ===
Mutt Williams (Shia LaBeouf), born Henry Walton Jones III, is introduced in Indiana Jones and the Kingdom of the Crystal Skull as a Panhead motorcycle-riding greaser and becomes Indiana Jones' sidekick. He is the rebellious son of former bar owner Marion Ravenwood and archaeologist Indiana Jones, although Indy and Mutt are unaware of their relationship until the events of Crystal Skull.

Having never met Jones after birth, Mutt believed that his British stepfather, Royal Air Force pilot Colin Williams, was his biological father, until he and his mother are reunited with Jones in 1957. Mutt accompanies Indiana to Peru to search for his mother, his surrogate father-figure and mentor, Harold Oxley, and the crystal skull. Mutt, who has travelled extensively with his mother, never graduated from school. Mutt is highly intelligent and excels at fencing (which proves useful in his duel with Spalko) and other practical adventuring skills. After both Mutt and Indiana discover their relation, the latter is furious that his son is a dropout and is determined to get him back to school. Mutt also resents his father as a schoolteacher despite his also being an adventurer and hates Indiana referring to him as "Son". They gradually develop their relationship towards the end of the film, when Mutt serves as his father's groomsman when Indiana and Marion finally marry. Later on, sometime before Dial of Destiny, Mutt enlists in the US military to annoy his father and is killed in the Vietnam War.

Mutt has a horizontal scar across his right cheek inflicted during a duel with Irina Spalko. Mutt has stated that his prep-school education has made him "handy with a blade". The novelization explains Mutt was champion on the fencing team, but was kicked out of school for placing bets on his matches. Mutt's occupation prior to meeting up with Indy is that of a motorcycle mechanic. It is implied that he has a fear of scorpions (similar to his father's fear of snakes and his late paternal grandfather's fears of rats and heights).

Frank Marshall said Mutt represents a youthful arrogance, to show Indiana is older and wiser. LaBeouf was Spielberg's only choice for the role. Excited at the prospect of being in an Indiana Jones film, LaBeouf signed on without reading the script and did not know what character he would play. LaBeouf watched Blackboard Jungle, Rebel Without a Cause and The Wild One to get into his character's mindset, copying mannerisms and dialogue from characters in those films, such as the use of a switchblade as a weapon. Authentic 1950s jackets were found for LaBeouf's costume, while the Harley-Davidson company provided his period-modified Springer Softail motorcycle.

George Lucas was interested in producing a spin-off centered on Mutt and his own adventures, with Indiana in a supporting role. However, Lucas later retracted a statement on the possibility of a spin-off series or LaBeouf taking over as the lead of the Indiana Jones series, stating "Harrison Ford is Indiana Jones, no Harrison means no Indy".

Two 3.75-inch (95 mm) figures of Mutt, a deluxe figure of him on his motorcycle, an Adventures Heroes figurine, and a 12-inch (300 mm) figure were released in 2008. Mutt is available in four Lego Indiana Jones sets based on Kingdom of the Crystal Skull.

In 2017, Dial of Destiny writer David Koepp revealed that the character would not return in the fifth film. It is revealed that the character died while serving in the Vietnam War prior to the film's events taking place, causing his parents' estrangement out of grief over his death.

=== Harold Oxley ===
Harold "Ox" Oxley (John Hurt) born in Leeds, England, is a colleague of Indiana who broke off contact with him in 1937 while searching for the skulls. Both Ox and Indiana studied under Abner Ravenwood. Ox was a close friend of Ravenwood's daughter, Marion, and hence became a surrogate father for her son Mutt, following the death of Mutt's stepfather. He is also aware of Mutt's true paternity to Indiana. Ox's wits have been addled by long exposure to one of the crystal skulls. As soon as the skull is returned to Akator, Ox regains his sanity, and is last seen at Indy and Marion's wedding, clapping enthusiastically. The character was inspired by Ben Gunn from Treasure Island.

The character of Oxley was created by Frank Darabont in his script of Indiana Jones and the City of the Gods. However, in his scrapped script, Oxley's name was Vernon Oxley.

=== Colin Williams ===
Colin Williams was a friend of Indiana, Marion's first husband, Mutt's stepfather, and another unseen character. He was introduced to Marion by Indiana and started dating her when Mutt was three months old and were married a year after Indy broke up with Marion. He was an RAF pilot and died in the line of duty during World War II.

== Introduced in Dial of Destiny ==
=== Helena Shaw ===
Helena Shaw (Phoebe Waller-Bridge) is the daughter of Basil Shaw, who fought with Indy during the Second World War and was eventually driven mad by the Antikythera. She is Indiana's goddaughter and she plays a vital role in this film. She is first seen during the university scene, where Indiana Jones teaches class. Through the movie it's shown that she has no respect for anything, she only cares in receiving money to get free of a debt, she also dislikes Indiana for not being with her when her father died, which Indiana, as her godfather should have done.

=== Dr. Jürgen Voller ===
Dr. Jürgen Voller (Mads Mikkelsen) was a German scientist, astrophysicist and "former" Nazi during World War II who was later hired by NASA under the name "Dr. Schmidt" to run the Apollo Moon landing program for them, while using CIA assets to search for the Antikythera, a time travel device built by the ancient Syracusan mathematician Archimedes which Voller intends to use to travel back in time to 1939 and assassinate Adolf Hitler.

In 1944, Voller discovers the Lance of Longinus in a Nazi fortress. He reports this to his superior, Colonel Weber. When they duck after hearing an explosion, Voller realises that the Lance is a replica. On a Nazi train headed for Berlin, Voller tells Weber that the Lance is a fake, but tells him that there is another relic on train. This is revealed to be one half of the Antikythera, a dial built by Archimedes that could allow for time travel. Voller explains that the power of the Antikythera is mathematics, instead of supernatural. Weber dismisses the Antikythera, asking Voller if he's ever met Hitler. Voller and Indy first encounter each other on the train, when Indy punches him, then Basil discovers the Dial half, which Indy tells him to take. Voller finds Basil and Indy with the Dial, and tells them to drop the gun (which Basil had), and then to give him the Antikythera. Indy throws something to Voller, and Voller is then hit by a metal pole.

By 1969, Voller has been recruited by NASA, and helped with the Apollo 11 Moon landing. He has been given the alias of 'Dr. Schmidt' from Alabama University. In his hotel room in New York, he asks the attendant bringing his food about his racial identity, and also if he fought in the war. Before the attendant leaves, Voller tells him that the Americans didn't win the war, but Hitler lost. He is still searching for the first half of the Dial, stolen by Indy in 1944. His accomplices in the CIA find where Helena Shaw is, which is at Hunter College with Indy. After the parade chase, Voller is being interviewed by a journalist. When the journalist asks if he intends Mars to be the next victory in the Space Race, Voller tells him that he's moving to the next frontier, as space has been conquered. Voller also makes a disparaging remark about the President when it is recommended that he has his suit pressed. He encourages the journalist to use the remark. Voller is informed by Agent Mason that they found Helena and Indy, but they escaped. Instead of flying to Los Angeles to collect a medal from the President, Voller secures a private charter that takes him, Klaber and Hauke to Tangier, Morocco. Voller arrives at the auction with Klaber and Hauke. When Indy recognises him from 1944, Voller tells him that he is confused, as his name is Schmidt, who comes from Alabama University. He tells Helena that the Dial is his, but Indy tells him that the Dial isn't his, because he stole it, and then Voller tells Indy that he also stole the Dial. During the chaos at the auction, Teddy runs into Voller, who then takes the Dial back. Voller, Klaber, and Hauke take a Mercedes-Benz to the airport, before Indy, Helena, and Teddy catch up to them on a tuk tuk. After the tuk tuk chase, they are captured by Agent Mason and the CIA. He is informed that the government wants him to vanish, as his accomplices blew up a nationally televised parade, killed 3 people, and then they went to Morocco, and created an incident that required military extraction. Voller asks to be taken to DC so he can explain, but Mason tells him that the government never cared about the Dial, only getting to the moon, and they only allowed Voller to search for the Dial in order to keep him happy. As the pilot informs them of their destination, Voller insists that he's not going back to Alabama. He tries to persuade Mason to continue the search for the Dial's second half, but she declines. At this point, Voller's accomplices take control of the plane, and kill Mason, when she intervenes. Voller tells her that his name isn't Schmidt, his name is Jürgen Voller. Whilst Indy and Helena search for the Grafikos in the Aegean Sea, Voller and his accomplices take control of Renaldo's boat, killing the crew. When they return with the Grafikos, Voller tells Indy that he's pleased that he isn't wasting his retirement, to which Indy tells him that he should have retired him when he had a chance. After Voller and Klaber wash the dust off of Grafikos, Voller asks Indy to read it, as it is in a code, Polybius, and Voller isn't familiar with it. Indy refuses, so Voller kills Renaldo. Helena tells them what the Grafikos says, and Voller concludes that the entrance to Archimedes' tomb is by the School of Mathematics, under a statue of Clio, in the ruins of the Great Library of Alexandria. Using a stick of dynamite, Helena blows up the boat, reclaims the Grafikos, and escapes with Indy and Teddy aboard Voller's boat. Through binoculars, Voller notices that the tomb isn't in Alexandria, as they are heading west instead of east. In Sicily, Voller's accomplices capture Teddy, who they use to find the Dial's second half. With Teddy, Voller and his accomplices made their way to the Ear of Dionysus, his men killing several people before entering the caves. Noticing where Indy and Helena had gone, they followed them deeper into the tomb bringing Teddy with them.

Voller found Indy and Helena at the tomb. He attempted to take the Dial, but Indy refused, he pointed a gun at Helena, asking Indy if he really wanted to lose his godchild, after losing his son, and having his wife leave him. Indy gave Voller the second half of the Dial, allowing him to put the two parts together. As Teddy appeared, Voller gave his gun to Klaber, who then shot Indy. Indy asked what was happening now, and Voller told his accomplices to bring Indy with them. In the van on their way to an airfield, Indy asked Voller who he intended to kill in 1939, expecting it to be a leader of the Allies, like Churchill or Ike. Voller informed Indy of his plan. They fly into the eye of the storm, landing on 20th August 1939, with enough fuel to reach Munich, they will go to 16 Prinzregetnplatz, as his quarry would be waiting for him, for an update on the V-1 Rocket, making Indy question what kind of Nazi Voller truly is. Voller tells him that he is the kind of Nazi who believes in Victory. He then tells Indy that he will correct all of the mistakes made by Hitler. On the plane, Indy tells Voller and his associates that Archimedes didn't know about continental drift, so their co-ordinates are off target. Realising that Indy is right, Voller demands for the plane to turn back, and for his mission to be stopped, but the plane has been pulled too far into the fissure. The plane emerged during the Siege of Syracuse in 214 BC, only barely able to correct itself after the anomaly shorted out its engines. At first Voller and his men celebrated, believing to have successfully traveled to 1939 and told the pilots to set a course for Munich; however, slowly they began to realize they were in a different time entirely, as the Siege of Syracuse was happening right below them. The plane was then immediately fired upon by the Romans who mistook the plane for a dragon. Voller once again ordered for the plane to enter the portal but to his horror, due to the damage done to it in the battle, it was descending quickly to the ground. Helena set about rescuing Jones, the two of them throwing some of the Nazis out of the plane in the process. Voller attempted to escape the plane by taking their parachute but Helena shoots him in the stomach and he toils back. Indy and Helena then jumped out of the plane and parachuted onto the island safely below leaving Voller and his men to their fate. Voller and Klaber are killed when the plane crashes onto the beach. Voller's body among the wreckage would later be found by Archimedes and his watch would be taken.

Mikkelsen described Voller as a man who would like to "correct" some mistakes of the past with the Antikythera to make the world "a much better place to live in," matching wits against Indiana Jones in a race to retrieve the artifact.

=== Renaldo ===
Renaldo (Antonio Banderas) is an old friend of Indiana Jones who operates as an expert frogman.

Banderas described his character is "a good guy who dies for Indiana Jones", and his role as a cameo appearance.

=== Basil Shaw ===
Basil Shaw (Toby Jones) is an Oxford professor of archaeology and Helena's deceased father, who fought with Indy during the Second World War, and was eventually driven mad by the Antikythera. Jones is the real-life son of actor Freddie Jones, who played Birdy Soames in The Young Indiana Jones Chronicles.

=== Klaber ===
Klaber (Boyd Holbrook) is an Alabama-born Neo-Nazi, a CIA-affiliated assassin, and Voller's nefarious and trigger-happy "lapdog".

=== Teddy Kumar ===
Teddy Kumar (Ethann Isidore) is Helena's Moroccan ward, described as a "Short Round-type".

=== Agent Mason ===
Agent Mason (Shaunette Renée Wilson) is an African American CIA agent who is (rather reluctantly) assigned to work for Voller. After revealing his true intentions to her, Klaber shoots and kills her.

=== Colonel Weber ===
Colonel Weber (Thomas Kretschmann) is a Nazi colonel whom Voller works for in 1944. He manages to pursue Jones and Shaw through the train until he is killed during a scuffle with the latter.

=== Hauke ===
Hauke (Olivier Richters) is a henchman of Voller's.

Hauke is a heavybuilt henchman that opposes Indiana Jones, a role preceded by Pat Roach in the first two Indiana Jones films, Igor Jijikine in Kingdom of the Crystal Skull, and Tony Todd in The Great Circle. However, he is not defeated by Indy, rather, he is instead killed by Teddy, who handcuffs him to an underwater grate, leaving him to drown.

=== Pontimus ===
Pontimus (Mark Killeen) is a Roman soldier who fought at the Siege of Syracuse during 212 BC, who comes into conflict with the time-travelling Nazis.

=== Archimedes ===
Archimedes (Nasser Memarzia) is a brilliant scientist from Syracuse, who in 212 BC invented the Antikythera mechanism, allowing for anyone to use it in the future to travel back in time to that date.

=== Durkin ===
Durkin (Martin McDougall) is a CIA agent assigned to work for Voller alongside Mason. A previous accident forced him to have to use crutches to walk. He is presumably killed when Indy knocks over a shelf in an attempt to escape, crushing him.

Early in his career, Martin McDougall had portrayed a Red Cross worker named Joe in The Young Indiana Jones Chronicles episode "Northern Italy, June 1918" (later edited into the first half of the film Tales of Innocence, with its plot moved to 1917).

=== Aziz Rahim ===
Aziz Rahim (Alaa Safi) is the millionaire son of a Moroccan mobster and the ex-fiancé of Helena Shaw.

== Introduced in other media ==
=== Sophia Hapgood ===
Sophia Hapgood debuted in the 1992 video game Indiana Jones and the Fate of Atlantis and its comic book adaptation. Sophia's backstory in Fate of Atlantis explains she was born in Boston and became briefly romantically involved with Indiana while accompanying him on an expedition in Iceland. Afterwards, she becomes a psychic giving lectures on Atlantis, and accompanies Indiana on his quest to stop the Nazis harnessing the lost city's power in 1939. Sophia wears a necklace containing the Atlantean King's consciousness: although Indiana frees her from its power, an alternate ending depicts her being consumed and dying.

The Thunder in the Orient comic, set in 1938, has Sophia asked for Indiana's help securing a tablet by Buddha, which can help the reader achieve nirvana: The Empire of Japan wants it to unify Asia's 500 million Buddhists under its rule. Sophia is briefly captured by bandits in Afghanistan, before battling Japanese soldiers for the tablet on the Yangtze River and losing it. In the 1999 video game sequel Indiana Jones and the Infernal Machine, Sophia, voiced by Tasia Valenza, is a Central Intelligence Agency officer in 1947. She accompanies Jones during his search for the Babylonian Infernal Machine. In the game's finale, she is possessed by the god Marduk, but Indiana frees her.

=== Ginetta "Gina" Lombardi ===
Gina Lombardi debuted in 2024 video game Indiana Jones and the Great Circle for PC, PS5, Xbox Series X/S, and Nintendo Switch 2. Gina's voice and motion capture are provided by actress Alessandra Mastronardi.

=== Mei Ying ===
Mei Ying debuted in 2003 video game Indiana Jones and the Emperor's Tomb for PC, PS2, and Xbox. She is voiced by actress Vivian Wu.
