= Sallah =

Indiana Jones character

- Indiana Jones character
- Sallah, portrayed by John Rhys-Davies in Raiders of the Lost Ark
- First appearance: Raiders of the Lost Ark (1981)
- Portrayed by: John Rhys-Davies
- Voiced by: Bob Joles (Indiana Jones Adventure)

In-universe information
- Full name: Sallah Mohammed Faisel el-Kahir
- Occupation: Professional excavator, taxi driver
- Nationality: Egyptian

Sallah Mohammed Faisel el-Kahir (Arabic: صلاح محمد فيصل القاهر) is a fictional character played by Welsh actor John Rhys-Davies in three of the Indiana Jones films: Raiders of the Lost Ark, Indiana Jones and the Last Crusade, and Indiana Jones and the Dial of Destiny. He also appears in various comics and novels, and is featured in the Disney theme park attractions, the Indiana Jones Adventure and The Great Movie Ride.

== Character ==
Sallah is a hefty, bearded Egyptian excavator. He lives in Cairo and is a close friend of Indiana Jones. He is a dedicated family man with a wife named Fayah and nine children, all of whom seem to have a fondness for Indiana (at one point they all surround him to save him from a group of Egyptian collaborators and SD agents who have their guns drawn on him).

Sallah is portrayed in Raiders of the Lost Ark as being jovial, good-natured, and occasionally cowardly (when seeing numerous snakes inside the Well of Souls, the room that houses the Ark of the Covenant, he suggests to Indiana, "You go first"), although unlike Indy, Sallah is not afraid of snakes. His "original" self often sings, as depicted when the old imam indirectly reveals that the Nazis are digging in the wrong spot or when Indy and Marion leave Egypt on the Bantu Wind.

He seems to be extremely strong, although he is apparently unaware of his enormous strength. He has a strong baritone voice and he seems to have an affinity for Gilbert and Sullivan. He is often seen singing tunes from H.M.S. Pinafore when he is in a good mood. In Raiders, he is mostly seen wearing a turban (perhaps to blend in with the other diggers working for the Nazis), and in Last Crusade and Dial of Destiny, he is seen wearing a fez.

The character was also a favorite role of Rhys-Davies, who spoke of trying to convince Spielberg to include the character in another film by citing it as the "common factor" driving the success of the first and third films. Nonetheless, he declined an offer to reprise the role in a cameo in Indiana Jones and the Kingdom of the Crystal Skull, feeling that the character deserved better than to be filmed on a green screen to be cut into a single scene of the film.

== Appearances ==
Sallah appears in Raiders of the Lost Ark (1981), where he helps Jones decipher the inscription on the back of Marion Ravenwood's medallion by taking him to an old wise man (identified as "Old Imam") who is also a friend of his. They learn that the Nazis are digging in the wrong location for the Ark of the Covenant—due to them only having access to one side of the medallion—so Sallah and Jones infiltrate the Nazi dig and they discover the real location of the Well of Souls where the Ark is kept. He reluctantly joins Jones in the snake-infested tomb, and they move the Ark to the surface. However, the Nazis discover the secret dig and capture the Ark and Sallah. They also throw Marion into the tomb with Jones, and seal it shut. Jones and Marion escape, however, and he tells Sallah to secure some transportation back to the United States. He makes a deal with the captain of the Bantu Wind, a tramp steamer, for bringing Jones, Marion, and the Ark back to the States, referring to the two of them as his family.

He reappeared in Indiana Jones and the Last Crusade (1989), where he fails in stopping Marcus Brody from being captured by the Nazis at İskenderun. Sallah later takes Jones and his father, Henry, to the Nazi convoy near the location of the Holy Grail. He borrows his brother-in-law's car, which is destroyed in the ensuing battle between the Nazis and the Grail's guardians. Indy tells Sallah, "No camels," and Sallah takes horses from the killed guardians for the return trip, as well as camels to compensate for his brother-in-law's loss. At the film's end, Sallah inquires what "Junior" means, and Henry Jones, Sr. explains that it is part of his name, "Henry Jones, Jr.". Indiana (who apparently does not like his given name) reveals that he nicknamed himself "Indiana" after his dog, leaving Sallah roaring with laughter.

Sallah's third and final film appearance is Indiana Jones and the Dial of Destiny (2023). Rhys-Davies expressed interest in reprising the role for the film, and his appearance in the film was confirmed at the D23 Expo in September 2022. In the film, Sallah is a taxi driver living in New York City with his family; it is explained that Indy helped relocate them to the United States during World War II. Sallah drives Indy to John F. Kennedy International Airport for a flight to Tangier, and returns for the final scene of the film, in which Jones is reunited with his estranged wife Marion.

Sallah appeared in Marvel Comics's The Further Adventures of Indiana Jones, where he helps Indiana recover the Chachapoyan Fertility Idol in Marrakesh (that Rene Belloq stole in the Raiders opening sequence). The 1990 novel Young Indiana Jones and the Tomb of Terror details his first encounter with Indiana in 1913, and his full name is given as Sallah Mohammed Faisel el-Kahir. Sallah reappeared in the ninth and twelfth Bantam Books novels set before the films: in 1933 Sallah helped Indiana find the philosopher's stone, and the following year he provides sanctuary for Jones on his way to the Great Sphinx of Giza.

== Concept and creation ==
The script specified Sallah as a thin 5 ft 2 in (1.57 m) Bedouin, while Steven Spielberg envisioned him as "a small creature from the Star Wars cantina in an earthbound adventure film". He offered the role to Danny DeVito, who according to Spielberg was "dying to play this part" but ultimately passed because of his commitment to Taxi. Spielberg saw John Rhys-Davies in Shōgun, and changed the role accordingly, advising the actor to portray Sallah as a cross between his role in Shōgun and John Falstaff. Kevork Malikyan, who played Kazim in Last Crusade, also expressed interest in the role, but a traffic jam caused him to miss his audition. Rhys-Davies described having substantial creative freedom to improvise lines and other aspects of the character in the first film, but with opportunities for improvisation reduced in the second film due to the sharper focus of the story on the father-son dynamic between the main characters, and Spielberg's increasing maturity as a filmmaker.

When Rhys-Davies reprised his role for Last Crusade, he imagined Sallah had become richer since Raiders, leaving excavation in favor of selling antiques. He wanted to convey that Sallah "has gotten older and a little fatter. This time, we see him without the appurtenances of his wife and children. He's a little more resolute now, and he's more ready to have a physical go at the Germans himself. But other than that, he's still the same old Sallah".

There are two scenes deleted during filming of Raiders of the Lost Ark featuring Sallah. One is an extension of the scene where Sallah tosses the rope into the map room, after two Nazi soldiers demand help from him in freeing their truck from the sand. The entire scene also involved several Nazi soldiers demanding to be served water, while Sallah panics and spills water on their uniforms. The scene was supposed to have smoke in the background, but tires used in the scene made it too dark. Spielberg cut the scene to avoid spending half a day reshooting. The other scene depicted Sallah's fate after Jones and Marion's entrapment with the asps. The Germans decide to execute Sallah, but a young soldier put in charge of the operation has second thoughts.

There were also two scenes featuring Sallah cut from the finished cut of Indiana Jones and the Last Crusade. During the scene where Sallah fends off the German kidnappers, he hits a camel which spits mucus over the Nazis, and another shot with Sallah fighting the Nazis. The other depicts Indy and his father meeting Sallah at the İskenderun train station. It was deleted because of showing a minor transitional plot element.

== Reception ==
Sallah ranks at number 47 on Entertainment Weekly's list of the best sidekicks. They recalled his line, "Asps, very dangerous – you go first", citing it as "not the words of a coward, but rather, of a faithful (and perfectly honest) companion". Empire named him their thirtieth favorite element of the films, citing "his indomitable spirit", a "lovely singing voice" and "a roguish streak to match Indy's own".

Kenner released a 3.75-inch (9.5 cm) action figure in 1983. He was included in a TSR, Inc. collection of metal miniatures the following year. In 2008, Hasbro released a 3.75-inch (9.5 cm) Sallah figure that included shovel and a torch accessories. An Adventure Heroes figurine, which comes with a cobra and a mummy, was also released.
