= Henry Jones Sr. =

Henry Jones, Sr.
- Indiana Jones character
- Henry Jones Sr., portrayed by Sean Connery in Indiana Jones and the Last Crusade
- First appearance: Indiana Jones and the Last Crusade (1989)
- Portrayed by: Sean Connery (Note: Alex Hyde-White appears in a faceless cameo as a young Henry Sr., with his voice dubbed by Connery.); Lloyd Owen (The Young Indiana Jones Chronicles)

In-universe information
- Full name: Henry Walton Jones, Sr.
- Gender: Male
- Occupation: Archaeologist; Professor of Medieval Literature
- Spouse: Anna Mary Jones (wife) (deceased)
- Children: Henry Walton "Indiana" Jones, Jr. (son); Susie Jones (daughter) (deceased)
- Relatives: Henry Walton "Mutt" Jones III (grandson) Sophie Jones (granddaughter) Grace Jones (sister); Fred (brother-in-law); Frank (nephew); Deirdre Campbell (daughter-in-law) (deceased); Marion Ravenwood (daughter-in-law); Caroline Jones (great-granddaughter); Spike (great-grandson); Lucy (great-granddaughter); Annie Jones (great-great-granddaughter); Harry Jones (great-great-grandson)
- Religion: Christian
- Nationality: Scottish

Professor Henry Walton Jones, Sr. is a fictional character in the Indiana Jones franchise. He is the Scottish father of Indiana Jones and is a professor of medieval studies at Princeton University. Alongside his academic teachings, Jones Sr. is an author of many books and a professional speaker on his historical subject at many conferences throughout the world. His relationship to his son in the franchise is noted as indifferent due to conflicts on their approaches to their situations, despite the fondness they share for history and archaeology. Much of his life was dedicated to research into the Holy Grail of Christian legend.

Sean Connery portrays Dr. Jones in his debut in the 1989 film Indiana Jones and the Last Crusade, while Lloyd Owen portrays him in The Young Indiana Jones Chronicles. Alongside appearances in live-action media, the character has featured in Indiana Jones novels and comic books.

== Characterization ==
Henry Jones, Sr. (left) and Henry "Indiana" Jones (right)

The father of renowned archaeologist Indiana Jones, Henry was born in Scotland on December 12, 1872. Having received his degree from the University of Oxford in 1893, he is a professor of medieval literature at Princeton University – according to his son, "the one the students hope they don't get".

A driven man, Henry is fascinated by the search for the Holy Grail, keeping all the clues he found regarding its whereabouts in his Grail diary. He is presumably a Christian (although his denomination is unclear), made evident by his intolerance of his son using Jesus' name in vain, slapping the younger Henry across the face when he does so and telling him, "That's for blasphemy!"

Seemingly finding parenting difficult, Henry Sr. mostly bonded with his son through their mutual fascination with history. After the death of his wife Anna from influenza in 1912, the gulf between father and son grew to the point where they rarely spoke. Henry claims this was a way of teaching his son "self-reliance", while Indiana felt that his father simply cared more about his intellectual pursuits than about his own son, saying: "What you taught me was that I was less important to you than some people who'd been dead for five hundred years in another country." When Henry explains that the search for the Grail is "a race against evil", Indy lashes out at him: "This is an obsession, Dad! I never understood it! Never!" To Indiana's constant exasperation, Henry refers to his son only as "Junior" until the end of The Last Crusade, when he finally relents and calls him "Indiana" when he convinces him to let the Grail go. (Indiana later calls his own son "Junior".)

Another factor which deteriorated Indiana and Henry's relationship was Indiana going off to enlist in the Belgian Army for World War I in 1916 without his father's consent, and the two went three years without seeing each other. Because of his father's aloofness, Indy embraced his father's friend Marcus Brody as a father figure and role model. His father's distant nature may have influenced Indiana's own reluctance to settle down and start a family.

For much of Indiana's life, Henry disapproves of his son's frequent resort to violence, considering it unworthy of a scholar. When Indy guns down a pair of Nazis, Henry exclaims "Look what you did! I can't believe what you did!" However, during their motorcycle escape, he is impressed when his son defeats their Nazi pursuers using a flagpole like a jousting lance. Rather than physical confrontation, Henry prefers more elegant expedients, such as when he flaps his umbrella at a flock of seagulls, sending them into the engines of a pursuing Nazi fighter plane. When Indy punches a Nazi during the final tank battle, Henry shouts, "You call this archaeology?!" But at last, Henry blows up a truck full of Nazis to Brody's horror, explaining "It's war!"

Henry suffers from a fear of rats, similar to his son's fear of snakes, and apparently also from acrophobia. He has a habit of saying "This is intolerable!" in particularly trying circumstances.

== Appearances ==
In Indiana Jones and the Last Crusade, set in 1938, Walter Donovan finds a tablet that provides new clues to the Grail's location, he hires Henry to lead an expedition to locate the artifact. While on the expedition, he discovers that his colleague Elsa Schneider (Henry's and later Indy's paramour) is working for the Nazis. Henry mails his Grail diary, with its many vital clues, to his son for safekeeping. Shortly afterwards, while carrying out research in a library in Venice, he is captured by Nazi officials and interned in Brunwald Castle on the Austrian border.

He is rescued from the castle by his son, and they learn that Donovan is also working with the Nazis. Henry convinces Indiana that the Grail must not be taken by the Nazis and that they need to go to Berlin to reclaim his Grail diary to complete the quest. During the course of the adventure, Marcus is captured and when Indiana goes to battle the Nazis, Henry tries to rescue Marcus himself. During the course of the battle, Henry blows up a truck full of Nazis, saving Indiana's life. Working together, Marcus and Henry manage to escape the tank they're trapped in. When Indy nearly falls to his death off a cliff after fighting Nazis on a tank, Henry is horrified when he thinks his son has died, and is greatly relieved when Indy reveals himself to be alive and well. Henry is shot by Donovan in the film's climax, but Indiana finds the Grail in time and uses it to heal his wounds. Henry returns the favor by rescuing Indiana from a rift (created when Elsa crosses a seal with the Grail), imploring his son to let the Grail go, even calling him by his nickname "Indiana" for the first time and implying that he cares more about Indiana than the Grail. Henry also reveals the true meaning behind Indy's nickname, it was the name of his dog.

In The Young Indiana Jones Chronicles, following the publication of a successful book on chivalry in 1909, Jones is invited to speak at a number of schools and universities around the world. He took his wife and son along with him, hiring his former tutor, Helen Seymour (portrayed by Margaret Tyzack) to tutor his son.

In Indiana Jones and the Kingdom of the Crystal Skull, Henry is hinted to have died prior to the events of the film. A framed photograph of him is seen on Indy's desk at one point in the film. Indy at one point mutters "This is intolerable" while escaping from the Soviets and, near the end of the movie, addresses Mutt as "Junior". In the James Rollins novelization of the movie, it is said that Henry Jones Sr. had died roughly two years before, making his year of death between 1955 and 1956. However, in the James Luceno DK book, Indiana Jones the Ultimate Guide, it lists his death as 1951.

In the video game, Indiana Jones and the Staff of Kings, Henry is a playable character in a storyline specially created for co-op mode, which follows Henry Sr. and Henry Jr. as they travel to South America to prevent priceless artefacts from falling into the hands of the Germans.

Henry Sr. and Henry Jr. make very brief unplayable cameos in the video game Lego Star Wars III: The Clone Wars. Their appearance pays tribute to a scene from Indiana Jones and the Last Crusade.

Henry Sr. appears as a playable character in the world-building video game Disney Magic Kingdoms.

In Indiana Jones and the Dial of Destiny, Henry is seen in a photograph in Indy's apartment. It is also revealed that he owned a watch that he passed down to Indy before his death.

== Conception ==
Steven Spielberg chose to introduce Indiana's father in the third film, as he found the Holy Grail to be an unspectacular plot device. Spielberg felt that Sean Connery was the obvious choice to play the role because James Bond was an inspiration for Indiana. George Lucas and Harrison Ford were surprised by this choice because, as Ford explained in an interview, Connery (born in 1930), was only twelve years older than he was. Jones Sr., was first conceived as more bookish, but Connery enhanced the character to be more adventurous. In the scene where father and son were held captive by the Nazis, Indiana wanted to know how Jones Sr., knew Elsa Schneider was a Nazi. Connery "ad libbed" (ad libitum) the line, "She talks in her sleep," while filming. The first take could not be used because the crew could not contain their laughter or reactions as they found the remark to be extremely funny. Spielberg also included a reference to Bond when the bad guys were shooting at Jones Sr. with a Walther PPK, Bond's gun of choice.

To prepare for the role in The Young Indiana Jones Chronicles, Lloyd Owen prepared by watching numerous Connery films and studied his accent. Owen shared the character's love of medieval history, having studied Geoffrey Chaucer's The Knight's Tale. Owen considered the character "a good father. I think that's obvious by the way Indy has turned out. He even said in the film that he's not the kind of father that says, 'Eat your food, go to bed, brush your teeth!' He's not that kind of guy at all. He's a very liberal parent for the 1900s."

Connery turned down a cameo appearance in Indiana Jones and the Kingdom of the Crystal Skull (2008), as he was enjoying retirement too much, and because "it was not that generous a part, worth getting back into the harness and go for". In a statement, he provided one last piece of advice for "Junior" – keep the cliffs low, the monsters CGI and the whip close at hand to fend off the stunt coordinator. George Lucas said in hindsight that it was good Connery did not appear, as it would disappoint the audience when his character did not join the film's adventure. Ford joked, "I'm old enough to play my own father."

== Reception ==
Sean Connery received Golden Globe and BAFTA nominations for his performance.

Horizon released a vinyl model kit of Henry in 1993, which the buyer could assemble. The Japanese company Kotobukiya released a vinyl kit in 2008. That same year, Hasbro released a 3 ¾-inch action figure that comes with his suitcase, umbrella and the Holy Grail; a die-cast model of him and Indiana in the motorcycle; and a Mighty Mugg (caricature) toy. Lego also made a Henry figure for its playset based on the motorcycle chase and the airplane fight.

Time magazine included Jones Sr. on their "Top 10 Movie Dads We’d Use To Build the Perfect Father", citing how he comes back into Indiana's life to help him search for the legendary Holy Grail, and his "detachment" as the "parenting trait they admire".

== Sources ==
- Luceno, James (2008). Indiana Jones the Ultimate Guide. foreword by Shia LaBeouf. DK Publishing. ISBN 978-0-7566-3500-8.
