= Three Days (of Hamlet) =

2012 documentary film by Alex Hyde-White

Three Days (of Hamlet) is a documentary film by Alex Hyde-White that follows his effort to produce a staged reading of William Shakespeare's Hamlet at the Matrix Theatre in West Hollywood, California during three days in July 2010.

== Cast ==
The cast includes Hyde-White (Hamlet), Richard Chamberlain (Polonius), Stefanie Powers (Gertrude), Tom Badal (Claudius), Peter Woodward (Laertes/Player King) and Joseph Culp (Himself) Mara New (Producer)

== Synopsis ==
The film builds on its main structure of on-stage happenings by juxtaposing stories from the players. Hyde-White weaves his own personal dramatic narrative about "Fathers and Sons" as he recalls stories from his childhood as the son of the well-known British actor Wilfrid Hyde-White. At times, particularly when the character of Hamlet experiences the visitations from his father's ghost, King Hamlet, the line of what is theatre and what is real life is purposely deconstructed, and what happens onstage is commented on offstage, to achieve a self-reflective dynamic.

== Reception ==
The film received some excellent reviews, won awards at three film festivals, including Carmel (2012) and played on Amazon Prime.

== Sources ==
- "Three Days (of Hamlet): Fantasy Documentary". Richard Chamberlain. n.d.
- Jones, Keith (May 14, 2014). "Three Days of Hamlet: A Documentary". Bardfilm.
- Nicholson, Amy (April 18, 2013). "Review: Chaos, laughs as Hamlet is readied in 'Three Days'". Los Angeles Times.
- Patankar, Aalhad (April 22, 2013). "Movie Review: Three Days (of Hamlet)". Daily Bruin.
- Scheck, Frank (April 18, 2013). "Three Days (of Hamlet): Film Review". The Hollywood Reporter.
