= Dragons Alive =

British television documentary series

Dragons Alive is a television nature documentary series about reptiles co-produced by the BBC Natural History Unit and Animal Planet. The executive producer was Sara Ford, the narrator was Lloyd Owen and the music was composed by Elizabeth Parker. The series was first broadcast in the United Kingdom on BBC One beginning on 24 March 2004.

== Episodes ==
No.	Title	Produced by	Original release date
1	"Ruling Reptiles"	Phil Chapman	24 March 2004
The first episode looks at the various groups of reptiles that inherited the earth from the dinosaurs.
2	"Smart Reptiles"	Yvonne Ellis	31 March 2004
The second episode looks at the incredible diversity of skills that reptiles possess.
3	"Future Reptiles"	Holly Spearing	7 April 2004
The last episode looks at the future of reptiles in the modern world.
