= Straussler =

Straussler, Straeußler, Strässler, Sträßler, Straessler, Stroessner, Strasser, Strassler, and the like may refer to:

== People ==
- Ernst Sträussler (1872–1959), Austrian neuropathologist
- Nicholas Straussler (1891–1966), Hungarian-born British engineer
- Gregor Strasser (1892–1934) and Otto Strasser (1897–1974), German politicians and early Nazi party members, who were the ideological leaders of Strasserism
- Tomáš Sträussler (1937–2025), the original name of the British playwright, Sir Tom Stoppard

== Fictional characters ==
- Maria Straussler, the female lead in the second segment of The Adventures of Young Indiana Jones film Masks of Evil

== Other ==
- Gerstmann–Sträussler–Scheinker syndrome, a condition named after Ernst Sträussler and others
- Strasbourg (UK: /ˈstræzbɜːrɡ/, US: /ˈstræs-, ˈstr ɑːsbʊərɡ, ˈstrɑːzbʊərɡ, -bɜːrɡ, .... That name is of Germanic origin and means "Town (at the crossing) of roads"
