= Alex Hyde-White =

English-American actor (born 1959)

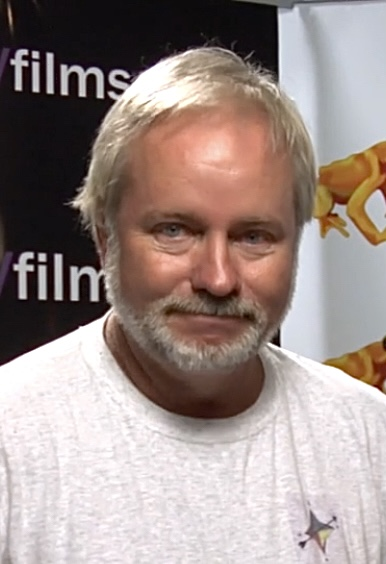
- Hyde-White at the 2011 Sundance Film Festival
- Born: 30 January 1959 (age 67); London, England
- Occupation: Actor
- Years active: 1978–present
- Spouses: Karen Dotrice (m. 1986; div. 1992) Shelly Bovert (m. 1997)
- Children: 2
- Parent(s): Wilfrid Hyde-White; Ethel Drew

Alex Hyde-White (born 30 January 1959) is an English-American actor. In 1978, he signed with Universal Pictures as one of the last "contract players" in Hollywood, in a group that included Lindsay Wagner, Andrew Stevens, Jamie Lee Curtis, Gretchen Corbett and Sharon Gless.

== Early life ==
Hyde-White was born on 30 January 1959 in London, the son of Ethel M. (née Korenman), a stage manager who acted under the name Ethel Drew, and Wilfrid Hyde-White. Known as Punch to friends, he grew up in Palm Springs, California, attending Palm Springs High School and Georgetown University in Washington, D.C. for one year after which he left to pursue an acting career.

== Career ==
Under contract to Universal Pictures at age 18, his first television job was one line – "leave my mother alone" – spoken to star Jack Klugman on the television series Quincy, M.E. He recurred in several episodes (each time as a different character) and also made numerous appearances in Battlestar Galactica and later Buck Rogers in the 25th Century which also featured his father Wilfrid. The only time both father and son appeared on screen together was on The Merv Griffin Show in 1980. A clip from that show is featured in his film Three Days of Hamlet.

In 1994, he played the Marvel Comics superhero Reed Richards, a.k.a. Mister Fantastic, in a motion picture adaptation of Marvel's flagship comics series The Fantastic Four. The film was low budget and made by certain parties in order to retain the film rights to the property; it was never released. Bootleg copies of the film made the rounds, and the film has acquired its own following. In 2025, he and his co-stars made a cameo appearance in the Marvel Studios film, The Fantastic Four: First Steps.

Through his production company TMG, named after his mentor, Washington attorney Steven Martindale, he produced the 2002 independent romantic drama Pursuit of Happiness, which starred Frank Whaley, Annabeth Gish, Adam Baldwin and featured Jean Stapleton in a cameo as the advertising agency's owner. Stapleton's son John Putch was the director. Putch had directed Alex previously in Deep Water and in Murder 101 for Hallmark.

Alex has worked with Steven Spielberg twice, Indiana Jones and the Last Crusade as a younger version of Henry Jones Sr. and Catch Me If You Can as Dick Kesner, the divorce lawyer. He also played the polo-playing grandson of Ralph Bellamy in Pretty Woman.

== Projects ==
Hyde-White directed the TMG production Three Days, from Universal City-based Ytinifni Pictures, headed by David Suarez. Also starring Peter Woodward, Richard Chamberlain and Stefanie Powers, the experimental first-person documentary follows a troupe of actors who gather for three days to rehearse and perform a reading of Shakespeare's Hamlet. The film won Best Documentary at three festivals, International Family Film Festival (Hollywood, Spring 2012), L-Dub (Lake Worth, FL, Fall 2012), and Eugene Int'l Film Festival (Oregon, Fall 2012).

His production company, TMG, is developing a few projects for both the big and small screen. One is the existentialist crime novel King of Infinite Space with the book's author Tyler Dilts, as an independent film. Screenwriter Peter Woodward is adapting the novel. The film is called Signal Hill. It is the first in the Danny Beckett series from Long Beach State professor Dilts. Another is Printer of Udell's based on the early 20th century novel by William Bell Wright.

His audiobook production company, Punch Audio, publishes through Audible such titles as Paladins by Joel Rosenberg, Miracle at Merion: Ben Hogan's 1950 Comeback by David Barrett, I Am John Galt, These Precious Hours and Mulligan by Michael Corrigan, and Jesus: The Missing Years by Walter Parks. Other artists at Punch Audio include the British actor Ian Hart, and actresses Mary Jane Wells, Liane Curtis and Kate Huffman.

== Personal life ==
Hyde-White was married to actress Karen Dotrice from 1986 until 1992. In 1997, he married Shelly Bovert.

== Filmography ==
Year	Title	Role	Notes
1978	Battlestar Galactica	Cadet Bow/Male Pilot	2 episodes
1979	Captain America II: Death Too Soon	Young Man	TV movie
1979	The Seekers	Oliver Prouty	Miniseries
1980	Gauguin the Savage	Emil	TV movie
1981	Buck Rogers in the 25th Century	Technician/Lieutenant Martin/Ensign Moore	4 episodes
1981	Tales of the Unexpected		Episode: "The Best of Everything"
1982	Voyagers!	Charles Dickens	Episode: "The Day the Rebs Took Lincoln"
1982	The Toy	Photographer	
1982	The Tragedy of Romeo and Juliet	Romeo	
1984	The First Olympics: Athens 1896	Arthur Blake	Miniseries
1986	Biggles	Jim Ferguson	
1986	Matlock	Vincent Hyland	Episode: "The Seduction"
1987	Ishtar	CIA Agent	
1988	Supercarrier	Lt Dave "Hat Trick" Rawley	
1989	The Phantom of the Opera	Richard Dutton	
1989	Indiana Jones and the Last Crusade	Young Henry	
1989	Time Trackers		
1990	Pretty Woman	David Morse	
1991	Ironclads	Catesby Jones	TV movie
1991–1992	Murder, She Wrote	Ogden Schmesser/Doug Simmons	2 episodes
1994	Walker, Texas Ranger	Grant Wallace	Episode: "The Committee"
1994	The Fantastic Four	Dr. Reed Richards / Mister Fantastic	Unreleased
1995	Legend	George Armstrong Custer	Episode: "Custer's Next to Last Stand"
1995	Babylon 5	Pierce Macabee	Episode "In the Shadow of Z'ha'dum"
1995	The Alien Within	Jedidiah Pickett	TV movie
1997	Diagnosis Murder	Efrem Connors	Episode: "A Mime Is a Terrible Thing to Waste"
2002	Catch Me If You Can	Mr. Kesner	
2003	Gods and Generals	Gen. Ambrose E. Burnside	
2003	The West Wing	Andy's Accoster	Episode: "The California 47th"
2005	See Arnold Run	George Gorton	TV movie
2006	Bones	Mr. Hobbes	Episode: "The Titan on the Tracks"
2010	NCIS	Dr. Adam Tallridge	Episode: "Double Identity"
2011	Night Club	Preacher	
2011	The Adventures of Tintin: Secret of the Unicorn		
2011	The Mentalist	Peter Upchurch	Episode: "Blood and Sand"
2011	Dexter	Dr. Trent Casey	Episode: "Get Gellar"
2011	The Christmas Pageant	Noah Humphrey	TV movie
2012	Game Change	Sen. Lindsey Graham (R-SC)	
2012	Three Days of Hamlet	Ghost/Son	Documentary
2015	Agents of S.H.I.E.L.D.	Lord Thornally	Episode: "Purpose in the Machine"
2015	Doomed!: The Untold Story of Roger Corman's The Fantastic Four	Himself	Documentary
2015	A Kind of Magic	Ben Paris	
2016	Shameless	Priest	
2016	Surge of Power: Revenge of the Sequel	Club	
2018	Little Hero	Asura	animation film
2018	The Bard's Tale IV: Barrows Deep	Gaufroi	Video game
2019	This Is Us	Mr. Flaherty	
2020	General Hospital	Pascal	2 episodes
2021	The Marriage Zone	Cal	TV movie
2022	Nope	Grizz	
2023	Invitation to a Murder	Sean	
2025	The Fantastic Four: First Steps	ABC Newscaster William Russell	Cameo appearance
TBA	Angelyne	Felix	Mini-series
