= Lloyd Owen =

English actor (born 1966)

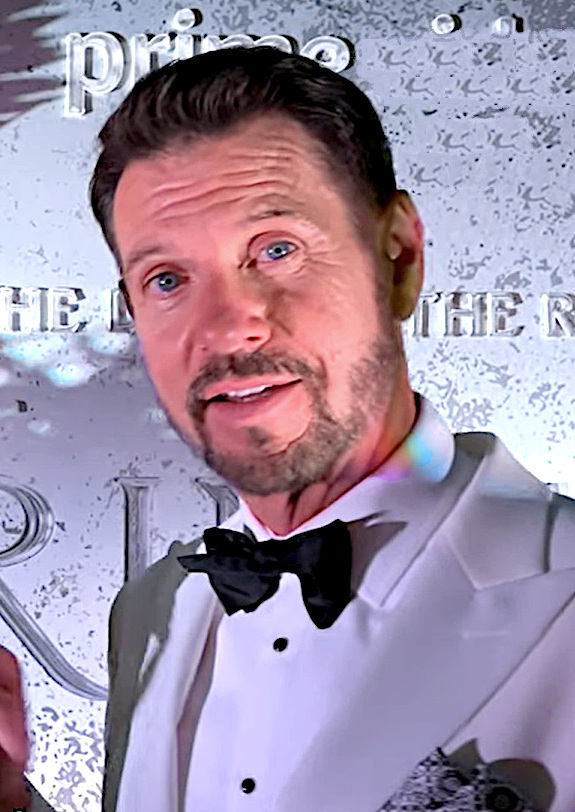
- Owen at LotR-TRoP Premiere 2022
- Born: Marcus Richard Lloyd Owen; 14 April 1966 (age 60); Charing Cross, London, England
- Education: Royal Academy of Dramatic Art
- Occupation: Actor
- Years active: 1987–present
- Spouse: Juliette Mole
- Children: 2
- Father: Glyn Owen

Marcus Richard Lloyd Owen (born 14 April 1966) is an English actor. Trained at the National Youth Theatre and the Royal Academy of Dramatic Art (RADA) in London, he is known for portraying Indiana Jones's father Professor Dr. Henry Jones Sr. in George Lucas's The Young Indiana Jones Chronicles between 1992 and 1993 and Paul Bowman-MacDonald in the BBC Scotland series Monarch of the Glen from 2002 to 2005. He starred as solicitor William Heelis in the film Miss Potter (2006) and commander Nathan Walker in Apollo 18 (2011). He plays the role of Elendil in the Amazon Prime fantasy series The Lord of the Rings: The Rings of Power (2022–present).

== Early life ==
Owen was born on 14 April 1966 at the Charing Cross Hospital in Westminster, London. He was brought up in London, although both of his parents were Welsh – his father, actor Glyn Owen (1928–2004), was from Caernarfon, while his mother, actress Patricia Mort, was from Swansea. Despite being born in England, Owen considers himself Welsh. His sister is the actress Cathy Owen (b. 1968).

Owen said he grew up around "a mob of entertaining, troublesome, fascinating" actors involved in challenging the Lord Chamberlain during some of the most exciting days of a very controversial Royal Court Theatre. When he was at Highgate School, because his father was an actor, his teachers thought that he should be able to act, too. However, at first he was not interested. "I was always made to read plays at school but I never wanted to. Then I was made to take part in a school play and I didn't want to do that either but I started to get approval for my acting. I was reasonably academic, good at sport, but somehow with the acting, people said 'that was fantastic'. So I thought, 'maybe that's what I'll do then".

At 16, Owen went straight from school to the National Youth Theatre, and subsequently received formal training at the Royal Academy of Dramatic Art (RADA) in London, after which he joined the Royal Shakespeare Company. While at RADA he managed to get an acting job and an Equity card, but when he told the principal he needed a term off, the request was denied and he was expelled from the Academy after just a year. Fortunately, Owen landed a job with Cheek by Jowl and followed the theatre company on tour around the world performing Shakespeare plays. Owen has said that he wished he had gone to university, and that he had been "in too much of a rush".

== Career ==
Owen's breakthrough role was Professor Henry Jones Sr., father of Indiana Jones, in eight episodes of the American TV series The Young Indiana Jones Chronicles in 1992 and 1993. In real life, Owen is six months younger than Sean Patrick Flannery, who played the adolescent/young adult Indiana Jones in the series. Owen was heavily made up to look like a man in his late-40s when he filmed his scenes with Flannery. Subsequently, he portrayed the lead role of Paul Bowman-MacDonald in 28 episodes of the popular BBC Scotland series Monarch of the Glen between 2002 and 2005. He also played Professor Jon Ford in the BBC Northern Ireland series The Innocence Project (2006–2007). In 2014, Owen appeared in the second season of The CW's supernatural show The Originals as Ansel, Klaus's father. He also had a recurring role of the U.S. President Farrell in 2015 comedy series You, Me and the Apocalypse. In 2019, he played Dominic Swanson in the ITV drama Cleaning Up. In 2020, it was announced that Owen joined the cast of the Amazon Prime Video fantasy series The Lord of the Rings: The Rings of Power (2022), where he plays the role of Elendil.

Owen's film career has included appearances in short films, and supporting roles in The Republic of Love (2003) (as Peter), which was based on a novel by Pulitzer Prize-winning author Carol Shields, and in Miss Potter (2006) (as a solicitor named William Heelis who married children's author Beatrix Potter). In 2011, he starred in sci-fi film Apollo 18 as Commander Nathan "Nate" Walker. He also played officer John Clive in the 2018 Hindi film Thugs of Hindostan.

However, Owen's first love has always been the theatre. Early in his professional career he was involved in the Cheek by Jowl productions of Philoctetes and the Shakespeare plays Macbeth, The Tempest and Twelfth Night. Owen's break on stage was playing Nick in Edward Albee's Who's Afraid of Virginia Woolf?, directed by Howard Davies, at the Almeida Theatre in London in 1996. Owen studied the play during his A-levels, and it is his favourite play. Other highlights of his stage career include playing Dan in Closer by Patrick Marber in 1998 and George in The York Realist by Peter Gill in 2002. Critics praised his performance in the latter play as "astonishing in its power, throttled fury and sadness" and "superb, richly voiced", and called him "a fast-rising star".

== Personal life ==
Owen is married to actress and artist Juliette Mole. Together they have two children, Maxim (b. 1990) and Mimi (b. 1998).

Owen speaks fluent French.

== Filmography ==
=== Film ===
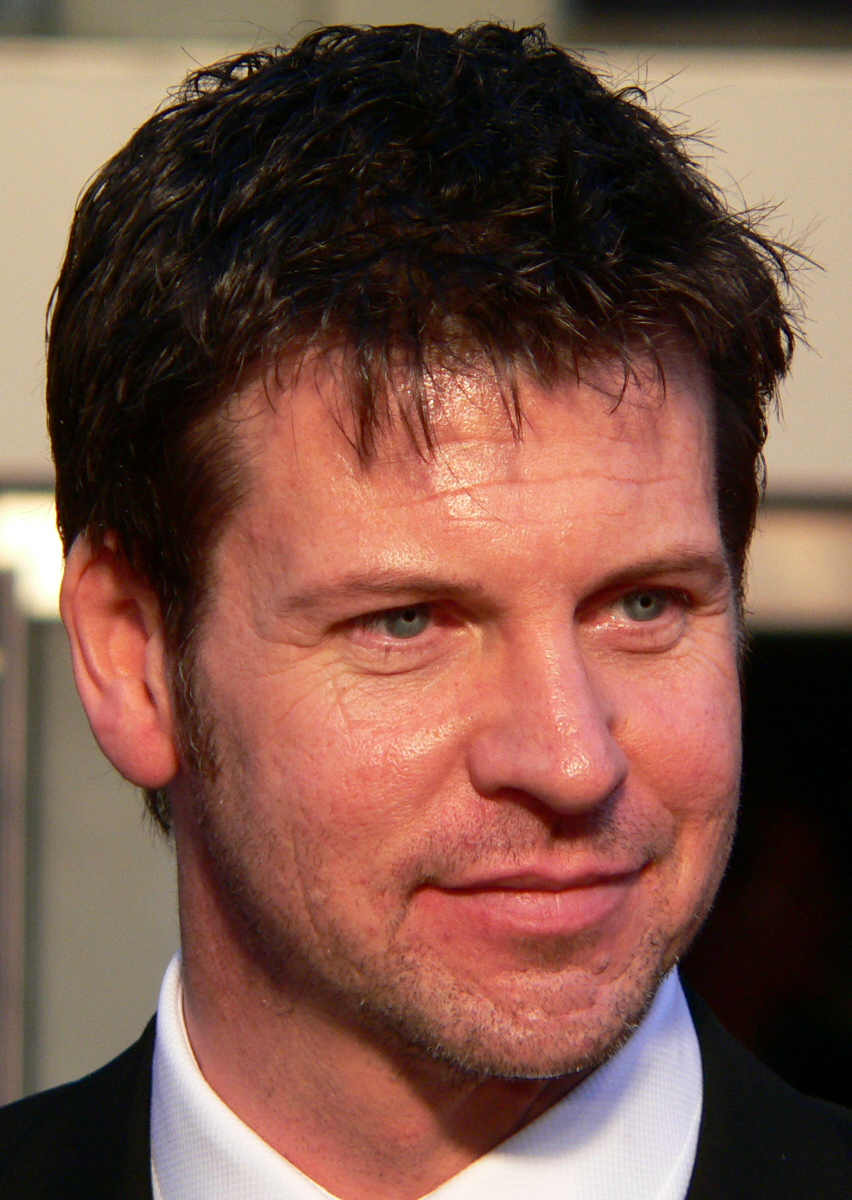
Lloyd Owen at Miss Potter Premiere, Leicester Square, London 2006

Year	Title	Role	Notes
1999	Between Dreams	Stephen Tredre	Short film
2002	The Seasons Alter	Oberon	Short film
2003	The Republic of Love	Peter	
2003	Confused	Johnny	Short film
2004	Get the Picture	Jake Wells	Short film
2006	Miss Potter	William Heelis	
2011	Apollo 18	Nathan Walker	
2013	Free Ride	The Captain	
2017	The Man with the Iron Heart	Commandant Schuster	
2018	Thugs of Hindostan	John Clive	
2022	Bounce	Surgeon	Short film; director and producer
2023	Wonderwell	Adam	

=== Television ===
Year	Title	Role	Notes
1988	Boon	Pete Blisset	Series 3, episode 7: "Honourable Service"
1991	The Chief	PC Farrell	Series 2, episode 3: "Jack and Jill"
1992	Forever Green	Paul Sherringham	Series 2, episode 4
1992	Science Fiction	Lord Byron	Series 2, episode 6: "The Story of Frankenstein"
1992–1993	The Young Indiana Jones Chronicles	Professor Henry Jones, Sr.	8 episodes
1993	Stay Lucky	Gerry Cook	Series 4, episode 3: "A Quick Killing"
1993	All in the Game	Darren Matthews	
1994	The Cinder Path	Charlie MacFell	
1996	The Bill	David Seabrook	Series 12, episode 24: "Boy Meets Girl"
1996	Young Indiana Jones: Travels with Father	Professor Henry Jones, Sr.	Television film
1998	Get Real	Adam	
1999	Casualty	Jack Chandler	2 episodes: "Calm Before the Storm"
2000	Harbour Lights	Inspector Nick Preston	Series 2, episode 2: "Thicker Than Water"
2001	Gypsy Girl	Jack	Series 1, episode 1
2001	Hearts and Bones	James Norton	
2001–2002	Des del balcó	Patrick O'Brien	
2002	Coupling	James	3 episodes
2002	Dead Gorgeous	Vic	Television film
2002	Wire in the Blood	Spencer Watts	2 episodes: "Justice Painted Blind"
2002	Monarch of the Glen	Paul Bowman-MacDonald	
2002	The Vice	Delaney	Series 5, episode 5: "Outcast"
2002	Dragons Alive	Narrator	Documentary
2005	The Ghost Squad	DI Bryce	Series 1, episode 1: "One of Us"
2006–2007	The Innocence Project	Professor Jon Ford	
2007	Viva Laughlin	Ripley Holden	
2008	Inseparable	Justin / Clyde	Television film
2009	Taking the Flak	Jack	Series 1, episode 1: "Bigfooting"
2009	Inside the Box	Kenneth Donnegan	Television film
2012	Fairly Legal	Robin Archer	2 episodes
2013	National Theatre Live: 50 Years On Stage	Tony Blair	Television film; segment "Stuff Happens"
2014	The Originals	Ansel	2 episodes
2015	Midsomer Murders	Louis Paynton	Series 17, episode 4: "A Vintage Murder"
2015	You, Me and the Apocalypse	U.S. President Farrell	6 episodes
2015	The Watcher	Tom Ward	Television film
2016	Death in Paradise	Dr Sam Blake	Series 5, episode 1: "The Complex Murder"
2016	Silent Witness	Det Supt Mitchell	2 episodes: "Life Licence"
2019	Cleaning Up	Dominic Swanson	
2022–present	The Lord of the Rings: The Rings of Power	Elendil	

=== Stage ===
Year	Title	Role	Venue	Ref.
	As You Like It	Charles / William	Wolsey Theatre	
	The Passport		Young Vic	
	The Parquet Floor		Young Vic	
1987	Twelfth Night	Sebastian	Cheek by Jowl / Swan Theatre	
1987–1988	Macbeth	Donalbain	Cheek by Jowl / York Theatre Royal	
1988–1989	The Tempest	Ferdinand	Cheek by Jowl / Donmar Warehouse	
1988–1989	Philoctetes	Sailor	Cheek by Jowl / Donmar Warehouse	
1989	Hamlet	Laertes	Leicester Haymarket Theatre	
1994	Henry VI, Part 3	Edward IV	Royal Shakespeare Company / The Other Place	
1995	Our Boys	Joe	Derby Playhouse / Donmar Warehouse	
1995	Grab the Dog		Royal National Theatre / The Studio	
1996	East Lynne	Captain Francis Levison	Greenwich Theatre	
1996–1997	Who's Afraid of Virginia Woolf?	Nick	Almeida Theatre / Aldwych Theatre, West End	
1998	Closer	Dan	Lyric Theatre, West End	
1999	Morphic Resonance	Wallace	Donmar Warehouse	
2000	The Way of the World	Mirabell	Royal Exchange Theatre	
2000	Julius Caesar	Brutus	Young Vic	
2001	Edward II	Mortimer the Younger	Crucible Theatre	
2001–2002	The York Realist	George	The Lowry / Bristol Old Vic / Royal Court Theatre / Strand Theatre, West End	
2003	Iphigenia	Agamemnon	Crucible Theatre	
2004	Clouds	Owen Shorter	Cambridge Arts Theatre / Yvonne Arnaud Theatre	
2005	Paul	Peter	Royal National Theatre / Cottesloe Theatre	
2010	Blood and Gifts	Jim Warnock	Royal National Theatre / Lyttelton Theatre	
2011	Loyalty	Nick Beeching	Hampstead Theatre	
2012–2013	The Bodyguard	Frank Farmer	Adelphi Theatre, West End	
2014	Good People	Mike	Hampstead Theatre / Noël Coward Theatre, West End	
2016	The End of Longing	Joseph	Playhouse Theatre, West End	
2019–2020	Noises Off	Lloyd Dallas	Garrick Theatre, West End	
2024	The New Real	Larry Yeates	The Other Place	
2026	ROI (Return On Investment)	Paul	Hampstead Downstairs	

=== Radio ===
Year	Title	Role	Notes
2001	'Tis Pity She's a Whore	Soranzo	BBC Radio 3
2007	Keep Your Pantheon	Lupus Albus	BBC Radio 4
2009	The Man in the Wooden Hat	Terry	BBC Radio 4
2010	Goldfinger	Felix Leiter	BBC Radio 4
2010	The School for Husbands and The Imaginary Cuckold	Valére	L.A. Theatre Works
2011	The Rivals	Captain Jack Absolute	L.A. Theatre Works
2011	England, Their England	Pendragon	BBC Radio 4
2012	Uncle Fred in the Springtime	Horace Pendlebury-Davenport	BBC Radio 4
2014	On Her Majesty's Secret Service	Franklin	BBC Radio 4
2015	Michael Frayn's Matchbox Theatre	Performer	BBC Radio 4
2020	The Man with the Golden Gun	Chief-of-Staff	BBC Radio 4
2020	Leave It to Psmith	Sebastian Beach	BBC Radio 4
2025	Casino Royale	Head of Staff	BBC Radio 4

=== Video games ===
Year	Title	Role	Notes
2011	Star Wars: The Old Republic	Various characters	
2017	Horizon Zero Dawn	Ted Faro / Jarm	
2022	Horizon Forbidden West	Ted Faro	
