= Marion Ravenwood =

Indiana Jones character

- Indiana Jones character
- Karen Allen as Marion Ravenwood in the film Raiders of the Lost Ark
- First appearance: Raiders of the Lost Ark (1981)
- Last appearance: Indiana Jones and the Great Circle (2024)
- Created by: George Lucas; Philip Kaufman; Lawrence Kasdan
- Portrayed by: Karen Allen

In-universe information
- Gender: Female
- Occupation: Bartender; Nightclub owner; Journalist; Public relations agent
- Family: Abner Ravenwood (father; deceased)
- Spouse: Colin Williams (deceased); Dr. Henry "Indiana" Jones, Jr. (1957–present)
- Children: Henry "Mutt" Jones III (deceased)
- Nationality: American

Marion Ravenwood is a fictional character who first appeared in the 1981 film Raiders of the Lost Ark. Played by Karen Allen, she enters the story when Indiana Jones visits her in Nepal, needing her help to locate the Ark of the Covenant with a possession originally obtained by her father, Dr. Abner Ravenwood. After 27 years of absence (21 years in the films' internal chronology), the character returned in Indiana Jones and the Kingdom of the Crystal Skull (2008) and Indiana Jones and the Dial of Destiny (2023), portrayed by Allen, and the video game Indiana Jones and the Great Circle (2024), voiced by Allen.

== Concept and creation ==
Screenwriter Lawrence Kasdan named the character after his wife's grandmother, and took the character's surname from Ravenwood Lane in California. Spielberg originally intended the role for his girlfriend Amy Irving. Sean Young and Stephanie Zimbalist auditioned for the role, Barbara Hershey was considered, while Debra Winger turned it down. Steven Spielberg cast Karen Allen, on the strength of her performance in National Lampoon's Animal House. Allen screen tested opposite Tim Matheson and John Shea, before Harrison Ford was cast as Indiana.

Kasdan's depiction of Marion was more complex, and she was genuinely interested in René Belloq in earlier script drafts. She and Paul Freeman added more comedy in the tent seduction scene. Allen came up with her own backstory for the character, such as what happened to her mother, her romance with Jones in her early to mid-teens, and her time in Nepal; Spielberg described it as "an entirely different movie".

After Raiders of the Lost Ark was released, Spielberg wanted Allen to return for Indiana Jones and the Temple of Doom, but George Lucas decided that Indy would have a different love interest in each film. Marion became a frequent supporting character in The Further Adventures of Indiana Jones, a Marvel Comics title which ran for 34 issues from January 1983 until March 1986. During the 1990s, Lucas forbade author Rob MacGregor from including her in his novels for Bantam Books' Indiana Jones series. "How did Indy meet Marion? What happened in their earlier encounters? George apparently wanted to keep that for the future. Maybe we’ll find out in Indy 4," MacGregor speculated. Frank Darabont claimed it was his idea to bring back Marion for Kingdom of the Crystal Skull, during his tenure as writer from 2002 to 2004.

== Appearances ==
=== Raiders of the Lost Ark ===
Marion's father, Dr. Abner Ravenwood, was a professor of archaeology obsessed with finding the Biblical Ark of the Covenant; he was also a mentor to the young Henry "Indiana" Jones, who eventually accompanied them on several digs.

Marion entered into a relationship with Indiana Jones during this time (when she was 15 years old, according to the novelization, although not quite reliable due to the differences and inconsistencies) Jones abruptly left the Ravenwoods in 1926; Marion was about 16 or 17 years old when the relationship ended, and Jones was 27-28, ten years her senior. Later in her life, Marion chastised Jones, stating, "I was a child! I was in love! It was wrong and you knew it!" Jones showed little remorse and simply replied, "You knew what you were doing."

After Jones broke off contact with them both, he returned to the United States to focus on his career as an archaeology professor, and Marion and her father settled in Nepal. She later started running a local tavern – "The Raven" – after its manager (her father) died and left it to her. Taking advantage of her high tolerance for alcohol, she would frequently drink the bar's patrons under the table on a wager. She refused to return to the United States until she had enough money to return "with style".

In 1936, Marion found herself back in contact with Jones, when he offered her money for the headpiece of the Staff of Ra, an artifact originally located by her father. Reluctant at first, she was forced to cooperate when the bespectacled Gestapo agent Arnold Toht arrived to demand the piece himself. During the subsequent fight, the tavern caught fire. Marion told Jones that, until he paid her the full price he promised, she was his partner. She was then captured by the Nazis in Cairo. Indy believed she was dead until he stumbled upon her bound and gagged in one of the Nazi tents at their dig site. Reasoning that an escape would draw too much-unwanted attention, Indy left her tied up but promised to return. The perceived betrayal did not affect Marion's refusal to cooperate with her captors, however. Belloq's advances resulted only in an aborted escape attempt, and Toht's interrogation was likewise met with uncommon resistance. After being captured by and escaping from Jones' rival, René Belloq, she helped Jones recover the Ark of the Covenant from the Nazis. In the process, the couple rekindled their relationship.

=== Indiana Jones and the Great Circle ===
Jones continued to pursue archaeological artifacts, while Marion tried her hand at journalism before opening a bar in New York City named The Raven's Nest. For a time, she also worked as the public relations officer for the museum at Marshall College. However, a week before their planned wedding Indy left her without explanation.

=== Indiana Jones and the Kingdom of the Crystal Skull ===
It is revealed that when Indy left Marion, not believing he deserved her, she was pregnant with their future son Henry "Mutt" Jones III. Marion began a relationship with the RAF pilot Colin Williams (whom Jones had initially introduced to her) three months after Mutt was born, and they eventually married and lived happily until Colin was killed during World War II. Jones' eccentric old friend, Harold Oxley, then helped raise Mutt, acting as a second (technically third) father.

Twenty years after Mutt's birth, Russians captured Oxley in an attempt to find the mythical crystal skulls that he had pursued. After she was captured trying to find Oxley, Marion sent Mutt to find Jones. After a desperate escape attempt, she revealed to Jones, who had remained clueless, that Mutt was actually his son. During the adventure, she and Jones again realized their love for each other. Back home, they were married, set to continue their adventures together.

=== Indiana Jones and the Dial of Destiny ===
In the late 1960s, Mutt decided to enlist in the military against his father's wishes, which led to him getting killed in action during the Vietnam War. Mutt's death takes a heavy emotional toll on Marion and with Jones finding himself unable to console her, she demands a separation and refuses to talk to him. After Jones returns to his present time from the Siege of Syracuse in 212 BC gravely injured, Jones' goddaughter Helena Shaw gets in touch with Marion about his injuries and she agrees to help him recover. Jones is surprised to see Marion and they reconcile when Jones finally admits his own anguish.
