= Raiders of the Lost Ark =

1981 adventure film by Steven Spielberg

- Theatrical release poster by Richard Amsel
- Directed by: Steven Spielberg
- Screenplay by: Lawrence Kasdan
- Story by: George Lucas; Philip Kaufman
- Produced by: Frank Marshall
- Starring: Harrison Ford; Karen Allen; Paul Freeman; Ronald Lacey; John Rhys-Davies; Denholm Elliott
- Cinematography: Douglas Slocombe
- Edited by: Michael Kahn
- Music by: John Williams
- Production company: Lucasfilm Ltd.
- Distributed by: Paramount Pictures
- Release date: June 12, 1981
- Running time: 115 minutes
- Country: United States
- Language: English
- Budget: $20 million
- Box office: $389.9 million (Note: This figure represents the cumulative total accounting for the initial worldwide 1981 box office gross and subsequent releases thereafter.)

Raiders of the Lost Ark (Note: Later marketed as Indiana Jones and the Raiders of the Lost Ark and commonly abbreviated as Raiders.) is a 1981 American action-adventure film directed by Steven Spielberg and written by Lawrence Kasdan, based on a story by George Lucas and Philip Kaufman. Set in 1936, the film stars Harrison Ford as Indiana Jones, a globetrotting archaeologist vying with Nazi German forces to recover the long-lost Ark of the Covenant which is said to make an army invincible. Teaming up with his tough former romantic interest Marion Ravenwood (Karen Allen), Jones races to stop a rival archaeologist, René Belloq (Paul Freeman), from guiding the Nazis to the Ark and its power.

Lucas conceived Raiders of the Lost Ark in the early 1970s. Seeking to modernize the serial films of the early 20th century, he developed the idea further with Kaufman, who suggested the Ark as the film's goal. Lucas eventually focused on developing his 1977 film Star Wars. Development on Raiders of the Lost Ark resumed that year when he shared the idea with Spielberg, who joined the project several months later. While the pair had ideas for set pieces and stunts for the film, they hired Kasdan to fill in the narrative gaps between them. Principal photography began in June 1980 on a $20 million budget, and concluded that September. Filming took place on sets at Elstree Studios, England, and on location mainly in La Rochelle, France, Tunisia, and Hawaii.

Pre-release polling showed little audience interest in the film leading up to its release date on June 12, 1981, especially compared to Superman II. However, Raiders of the Lost Ark became the highest-grossing film of the year, earning approximately $354 million worldwide, and played in some theaters for over a year. It was also a critical success, receiving praise for its set pieces, humor, and action sequences. The film was nominated for several awards, and won five Academy Awards, seven Saturn Awards, and one BAFTA, among other accolades.

Raiders of the Lost Ark is considered by critics to be one of the greatest films ever made and has had a lasting influence on popular culture, spawning a host of imitators across several media and inspiring other filmmakers. The United States Library of Congress selected it for preservation in the National Film Registry in 1999. Raiders of the Lost Ark is the first entry in what became the Indiana Jones franchise, which includes four more films—Temple of Doom (1984), Last Crusade (1989), Kingdom of the Crystal Skull (2008), and Dial of Destiny (2023)—a television series, video games, comic books, novels, theme park attractions, and toys.

== Plot ==
In 1936, American archaeologist Indiana Jones recovers a Golden Idol from a booby-trapped Peruvian temple. Rival archaeologist René Belloq corners him and steals the idol; Jones escapes in a waiting float plane.

After returning to the United States, Jones is briefed by two Army Intelligence agents that Nazi German forces have discovered and are excavating at Tanis, Egypt, and one of their telegrams mentions Jones's former mentor Abner Ravenwood. He deduces that the Nazis are seeking the Ark of the Covenant, which Adolf Hitler believes will render their army invincible. The agents recruit Jones to recover the Ark first.

At a bar in Nepal, Jones reunites with Abner's daughter Marion, with whom he once had an illicit relationship, and learns that Abner is dead. The bar is set ablaze during a shootout with Gestapo agent Arnold Toht and his men, who arrive to take a medallion from Marion. Toht attempts to recover the medallion from the flames but only burns its image into his hand. Jones and Marion take the medallion and escape.

Traveling to Cairo, the pair meet Jones's friend Sallah, who reveals that Belloq is assisting the Nazis and that they have fashioned an incomplete replica medallion from the image burned into Toht's hand. Nazi soldiers and mercenaries attack Jones, and Marion is seemingly killed, leaving him despondent. An imam deciphers the medallion for Jones, revealing that one side bears a warning against disturbing the Ark and the other—which the Nazis do not possess—contains a correction to the measurements for the "staff of Ra", which, when combined with the medallion, is used to locate the Ark. Jones and Sallah realize the Nazis are digging in the wrong location, infiltrate the dig site, and use the medallion and a correctly sized staff of Ra to locate the Well of Souls, the Ark's resting place. They recover the Ark, a golden, intricately decorated chest, but Belloq and the Nazis discover them and seize it. Jones and Marion, whom Belloq has been holding captive, are sealed inside the well, but they escape, and Jones captures a truck carrying the Ark.

Alongside Marion, Jones arranges to transport the Ark to London aboard a tramp steamer. A German U-boat intercepts them, seizing the Ark and Marion; Jones covertly boards the U-boat. The vessel travels to an island in the Aegean Sea, where Belloq intends to test the power of the Ark before presenting it to Hitler.

On the island, Jones ambushes the Nazi group and threatens to destroy the Ark. He surrenders after Belloq deduces that he would never destroy something so historically significant and also surmising that Jones wants to know if the Ark's power is real. The Nazis restrain Jones and Marion at the testing site as Belloq ceremonially opens the Ark but finds only sand inside. At Jones's instruction, he and Marion close their eyes to avoid looking at the opened Ark, as it releases spirits, flames, and bolts of energy that kill Belloq, Toht, and the assembled Nazis before sealing itself shut. Jones and Marion open their eyes to find the area cleared of bodies and their bindings gone.

Back in Washington, D.C., the United States government rewards Jones for securing the Ark. Despite Jones's questioning, the agents state only that the Ark has been moved to an undisclosed location for "top men" to study. In a vast warehouse, the Ark is crated up and stored among countless other crates.

== Cast ==
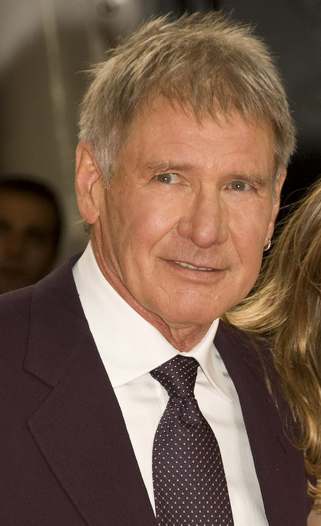
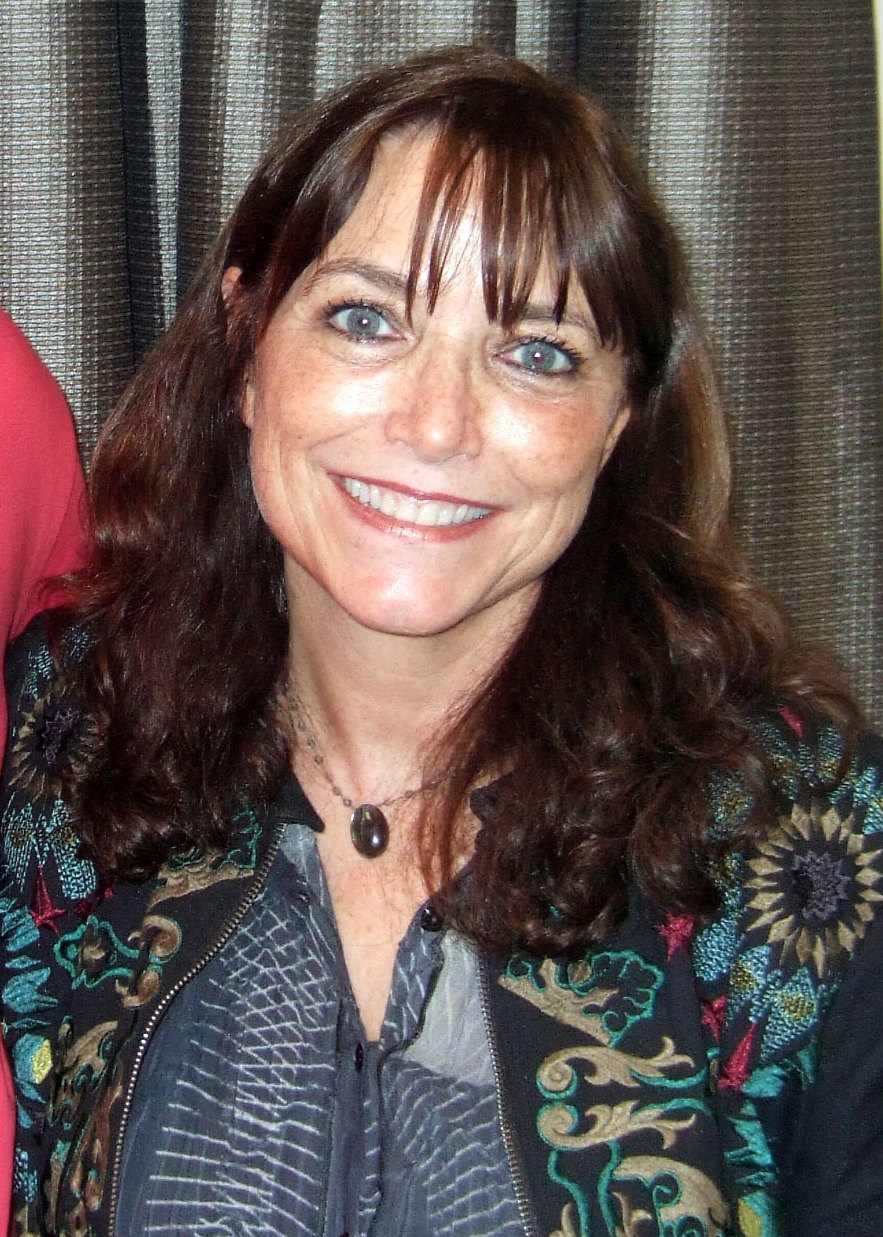
Harrison Ford in 2009 and Karen Allen in 2013
- Harrison Ford as Indiana Jones: An archaeology professor and adventurer
- Karen Allen as Marion Ravenwood: A spirited, tough bar owner and Jones's former lover
- Paul Freeman as René Belloq: A rival archaeologist to Jones, in the employ of the Nazis
- Ronald Lacey as Major Arnold Toht: A sadistic Gestapo agent
- John Rhys-Davies as Sallah: An Egyptian excavator and old acquaintance of Jones
- Denholm Elliott as Marcus Brody: A museum curator and Jones's loyal friend

Raiders of the Lost Ark also features Wolf Kahler as Nazi officer Colonel Dietrich and Anthony Higgins as Major Gobler, Dietrich's right-hand man. Don Fellows and William Hootkins appear as United States Army Intelligence agents Colonel Musgrove and Major Eaton, respectively. George Harris plays Simon Katanga, captain of the Bantu Wind tramp steamer, and Fred Sorenson portrays Jones's pilot Jock.

Producer Frank Marshall appears as the Flying Wing pilot. Pat Roach appears as the Nazi who brawls with Jones by the Flying Wing and one of Toht's Nepalese Sherpas. Vic Tablian plays Jones's treacherous Peruvian guide Barranca and the Monkey Man in Cairo. Alfred Molina appears as Jones's traitorous guide Satipo in his film debut. Terry Richards portrays the Cairo swordsman shot by Jones.

== Production ==
=== Conception ===
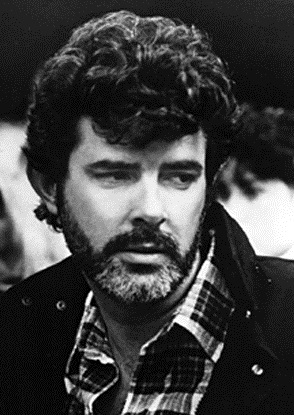
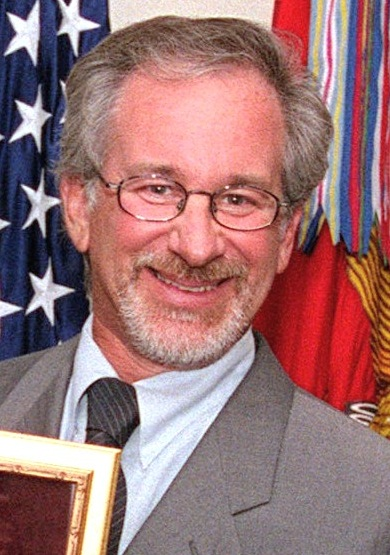
George Lucas in 1986 and Steven Spielberg in 1999

George Lucas conceived Raiders of the Lost Ark in 1973, shortly after finishing the comedy drama American Graffiti (1973). An old movie poster of a heroic character leaping from a horse to a truck reminded Lucas of the early 20th-century serial films he enjoyed as a youth, such as Buck Rogers (1939), Zorro's Fighting Legion (1939), Spy Smasher (1942) and Don Winslow of the Navy (1942). He wanted to make a B movie modeled on those serials and conceived The Adventures of Indiana Smith, featuring a daring archaeologist named after his Alaskan Malamute dog. Around the same time, Lucas was trying to adapt the space opera serial Flash Gordon (1936), but could not obtain the rights. He shelved the Indiana Smith project to focus on creating his own space opera, Star Wars (1977).

In 1975, Lucas discussed his serial film idea with his friend Philip Kaufman. The pair worked on a story for two weeks. Lucas imagined his character as a college professor and archaeologist adventurer, based on his own appreciation for archaeology and famous archaeologists like Hiram Bingham III, Roy Chapman Andrews, and Leonard Woolley. Kaufman removed Lucas's vision of Smith as a nightclub patron and womanizer, and suggested the Ark of the Covenant as the film's central goal, taking inspiration from hematologist Raphael Isaacs's theories on the physics of Biblical miracles. The Ark provided a source of conflict for the hero and the Nazis, playing off Nazi leader Adolf Hitler's historical fascination with the occult.

Lucas wanted Kaufman to direct the film, but because he was already committed to working on the western The Outlaw Josey Wales (1976), Lucas paused the idea again and resumed working on Star Wars. In May 1977, Lucas vacationed in Hawaii to avoid any potential negative news about the theatrical debut of Star Wars, which he feared would fail at the box office. He invited Steven Spielberg to join him and his wife. On a beach near the Mauna Kea Beach Hotel, Lucas and Spielberg discussed their next projects. Spielberg wanted to direct a James Bond film, but Lucas pitched him The Adventures of Indiana Smith. Lucas still hoped Kaufman would direct it, but a few months later it was clear he could not participate and Lucas asked Spielberg to replace him.

=== Writing ===
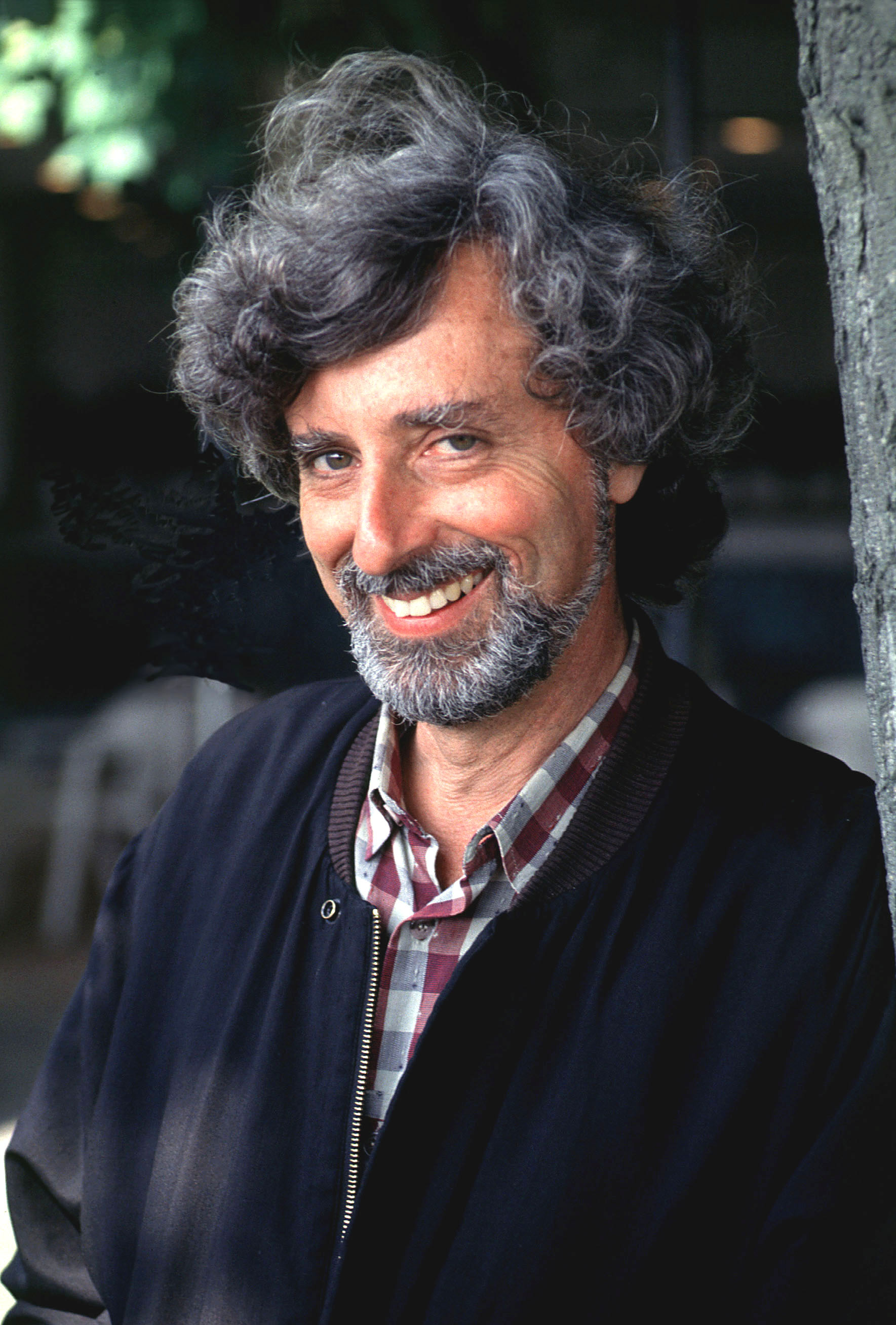
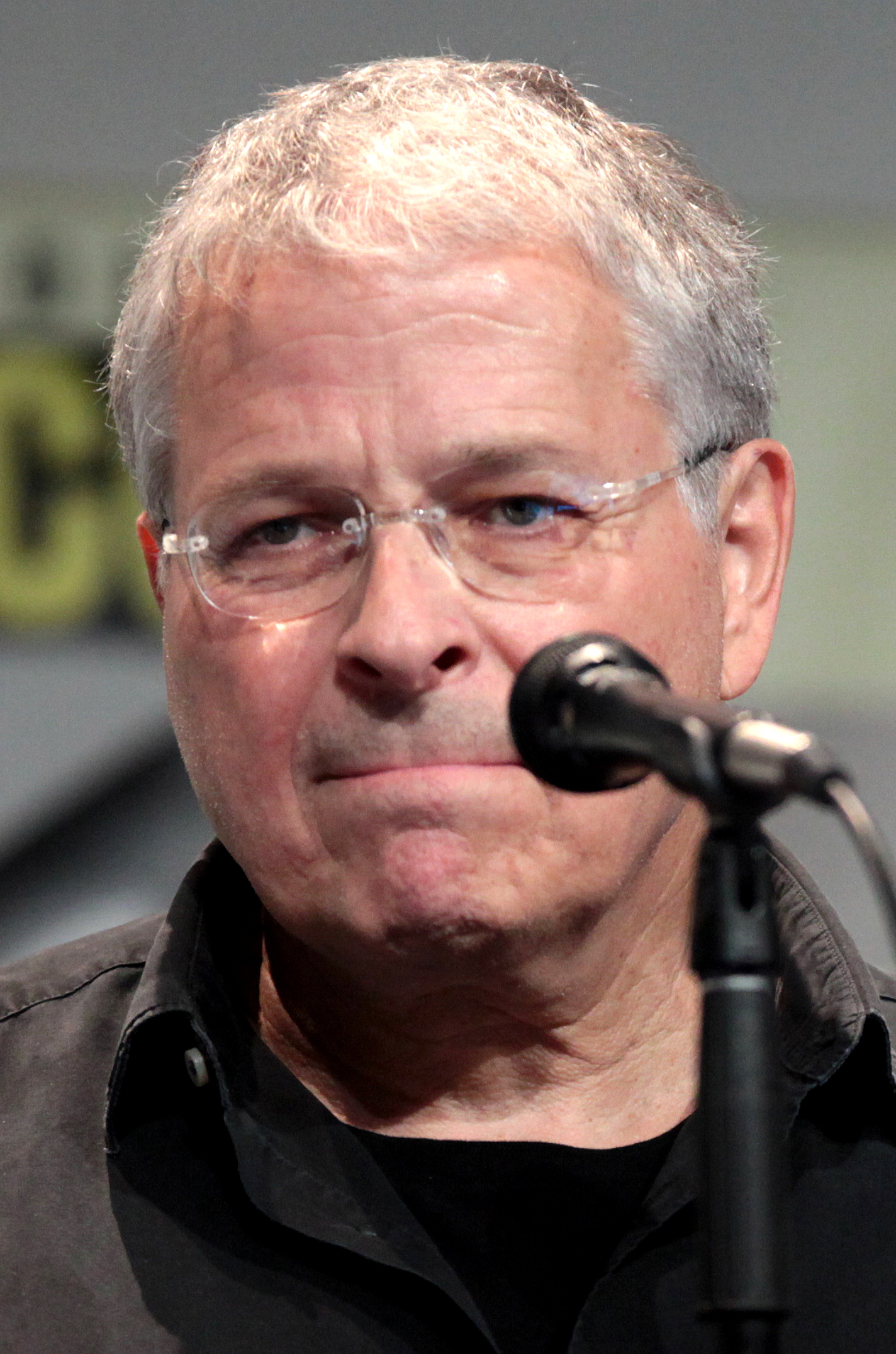
Philip Kaufman in 1991 and Lawrence Kasdan in 2015.

Lawrence Kasdan, Spielberg's recent discovery, was chosen to write the script. Kasdan had been working as a professional screenwriter for only a month but Lucas agreed to hire him after reading his script for Continental Divide (1981). In January 1978, Lucas, Kasdan, and Spielberg spent about nine hours a day over three to five days at Lucas's assistant's house in Sherman Oaks, Los Angeles, developing Lucas's outline. (Note: Attributed to multiple references:) Several ideas came from these discussions, including the boulder trap, the monkey in Cairo, Toht burning the medallion's imprint into his hand, and government agents locking the Ark away. Kasdan realized Spielberg and Lucas had several set pieces in mind, but they were looking for someone else to do the hard work of piecing them together.

Spielberg hated the name Indiana Smith, believing it would remind audiences of the Steve McQueen character Nevada Smith. All three men agreed to use the surname "Jones" instead. The Indiana Jones character was based on actors Clint Eastwood and Toshiro Mifune, and the fictional character James Bond. Lucas also wanted Jones to be a kung fu practitioner and a playboy, funding his lifestyle with the spoils of his adventures, but Spielberg and Kasdan felt the character was complicated enough being an adventurer and archaeologist. Spielberg suggested making Jones an avid gambler or an alcoholic, but Lucas wanted Jones to be a role model who is "honest and true and trusting." Both men felt it was important Jones be fallible, vulnerable, and as capable of comedic moments as well as serious ones. They intended him to be someone the audience could relate to and idolize. Lucas suggested Marion would have a romantic past, at the age of 11, with the much older Jones; Spielberg replied, "she had better be older".

While Spielberg directed 1941 (1979), Kasdan used his office to write Raiders, taking inspiration from early 20th-century serials and adventure films like Red River (1948), Seven Samurai (1954), and The Magnificent Seven (1960). He wrote Jones as an antihero, an archaeologist reduced to grave-robbing. Kasdan wanted a supporting cast with their own unique characteristics and believed it was important these characters had a memorable impact. He described how the hardest part of writing was explaining how Jones would fall into successive dangerous events and survive, and how he traveled between locations. In August 1978, after approximately five months, Kasdan completed his first draft.

Spielberg described the draft as good but too long; Kasdan and Lucas collaborated to trim and refine it. The script was a globe-spanning tale set in the United States, Egypt, Greece, and Nepal. Several elements were cut, including a journey to Shanghai that would lead to a minecart chase and Jones using a gong to shield himself from gunfire, ideas later used in the prequel Indiana Jones and the Temple of Doom (1984). To his frustration, much of Kasdan's love story between Jones and Marion was trimmed, as were scenes showing the mutual attraction between Marion and Belloq. The screenplay was completed by December 1979.

=== Development and pre-production ===
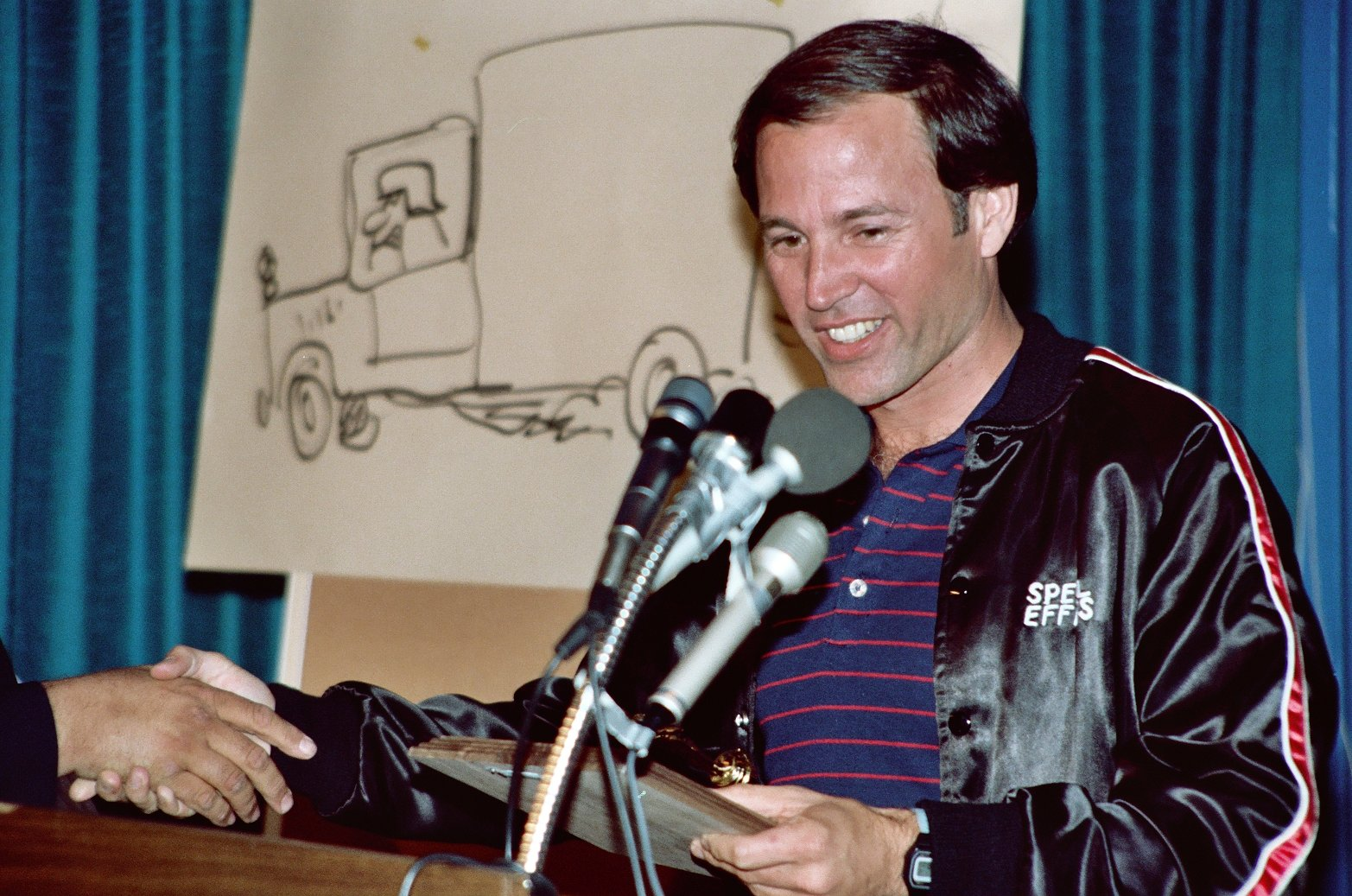
Producer Frank Marshall in 1982. As well as producing, Marshall had a minor role in the film as a Nazi pilot.

Lucas wanted to fund Raiders of the Lost Ark himself, but lacked the money. Lucasfilm offered the project to several Hollywood studios. They rejected it, in part because of the proposed $20 million budget, (Note: The 1981 budget of $20 million is equivalent to $70.8 million in 2025.) but also because of the deal Lucas offered. He wanted the studio to provide the budget, have no creative input and allow him to retain control of the licensing rights and any sequels. The studios considered this deal unacceptable. They were also hesitant because Spielberg had delivered a succession of films over-schedule and over-budget; his recent effort, 1941, was both over-budget and a critical failure. However, Lucas refused to do the project without Spielberg.

When the project was offered to Paramount Pictures, president Michael Eisner compromised with Lucas, accepting his deal in exchange for exclusive rights to any sequels and severe penalties for exceeding the schedule or budget. Lucas reportedly negotiated a salary between $1 million and $4 million plus a share of the gross profits, though a separate report stated he received only net profits. Spielberg received up to $1.5 million as director and a share of the gross profits.

Producer Frank Marshall, who had experience on smaller independent films, was hired because Spielberg believed he would keep the film on schedule and budget. Spielberg also hired cinematographer Douglas Slocombe and production designer Norman Reynolds because he liked their previous works, and his long-time collaborator Michael Kahn as editor. Lucas served as a second unit director and the film's executive producer, along with his acquaintance Howard Kazanjian, whom Lucas believed would be a disciplined influence and not indulge the filmmakers' larger ambitions. He also brought in his long-time collaborator Robert Watts as associate producer and production manager. Paramount mandated a filming schedule of 85 days; Lucas, Spielberg, and Marshall agreed on a self-imposed 73-day schedule. Spielberg was determined to avoid criticism for another schedule overrun.

Six months of pre-production began in December 1979. Spielberg preferred to spend a year in pre-production, but worked at a faster pace to keep the budget low. Spielberg and Lucas were both simultaneously working on other projects. Artists Ed Verreaux, Dave Negron, Michael Lloyd, and Joe Johnston provided extensive storyboarding, with over 80% of the script represented, equaling approximately 6,000 images. This helped Spielberg pre-visualize scenes and limit the time taken to set up shots. The script described the opening of the ark only as "all hell breaks loose", and the artists were tasked with envisioning what should happen. Each offered different aspects: spirits, flames, and weird light effects; Johnston was tasked with combining all three. Spielberg also had miniature sets of larger scenes built to plan layouts and lighting, including the Well of Souls, the Tanis dig site, and the Cairo marketplace. They contained 1-inch tall figurines to suggest how many extras would be required. Among changes made at this stage, Spielberg abandoned his idea for Toht to have a mechanical arm that could be replaced with a machine gun or flamethrower. Lucas said it put the film into a different genre.

=== Casting ===
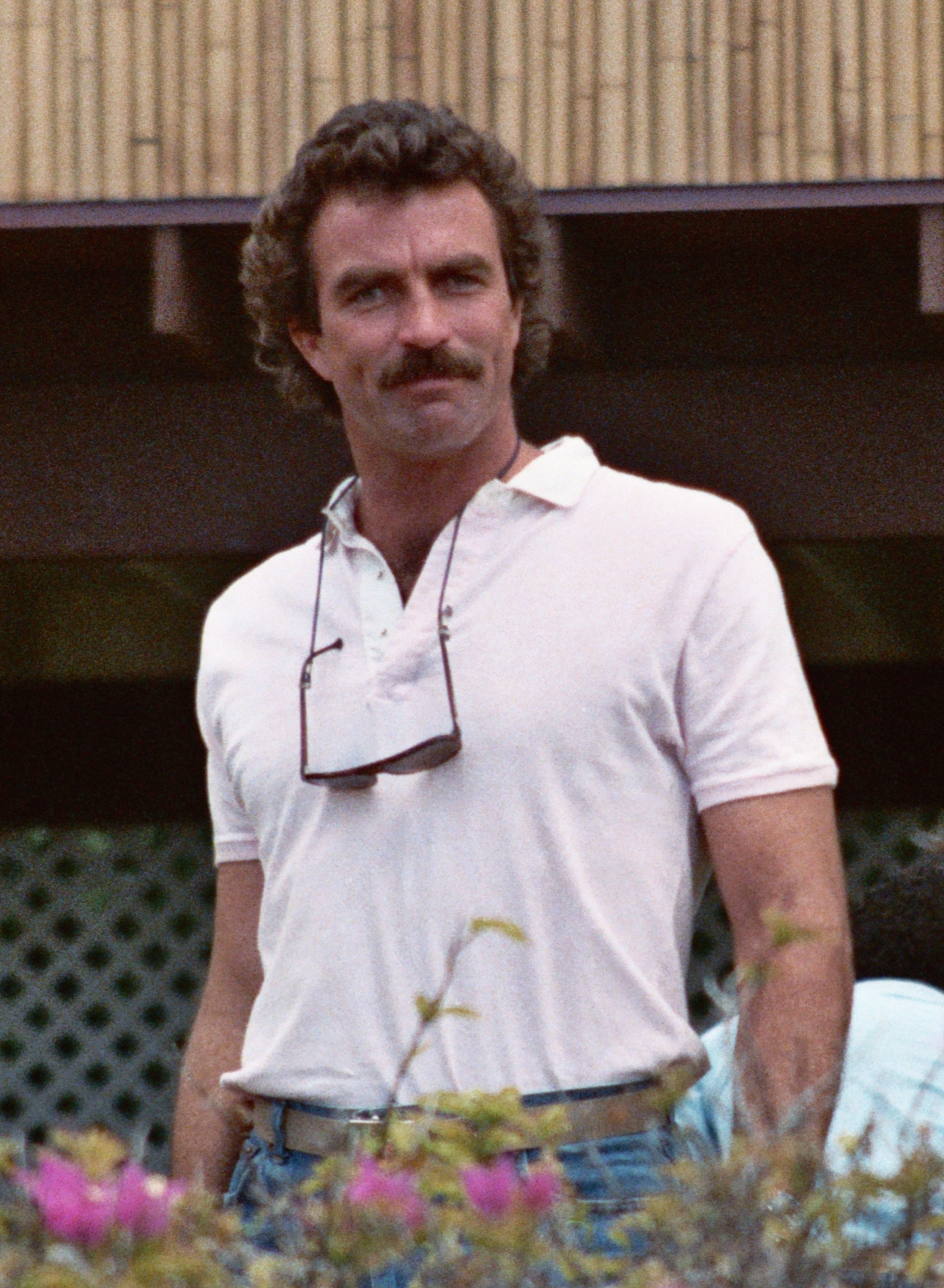
Tom Selleck was cast as Indiana Jones, but contractual obligations to the television series Magnum, P.I. forced him to withdraw.

Lucas wanted a relatively unknown actor, willing to commit to a trilogy of films, to play Indiana Jones. Those considered for the role included Bill Murray, Nick Nolte, Steve Martin, Chevy Chase, Tim Matheson, Nick Mancuso, Peter Coyote, Jack Nicholson, Jeff Bridges, John Shea, Sam Elliott, Harry Hamlin, and David Hasselhoff. Casting director Mike Fenton favored Bridges but Lucas's wife and frequent collaborator Marcia Lucas preferred Tom Selleck. Selleck was contractually obligated to filming the television series Magnum, P.I. if it were to be made into a full series. Lucas and Spielberg asked the show's network, CBS, to release him ten days early from his contract. Realizing Selleck was in demand, CBS greenlit Magnum P.I., forcing him to drop out and leaving the production with no lead actor only weeks before filming. The 1980 actors strike later put the show on hiatus for three months, which would have allowed Selleck to star as Jones.

Spielberg said Ford was perfect for the role after seeing him in The Empire Strikes Back; Kazanjian said Ford had always been considered but not cast because he was already a well-known actor. Lucas was concerned about seeming reliant on Ford by casting him in another film after Star Wars, and he also did not think he would commit to three films. However, Ford thought it would be a fun project and agreed to the deal. He negotiated a seven-figure salary, a percentage of the gross profits, and the option to re-write his dialogue. Ford undertook extensive exercise to enhance his physique and trained for several weeks under stunt coordinator Glenn Randall to use a bullwhip, becoming proficient enough to disarm the Monkey Man (Vic Tablian); his wrist had to be rehabilitated to compensate for an old injury. Ford's interpretation of the character was as an academic first and an adventurer second.

For Jones's love interest Marion, Spielberg wanted someone akin to early 20th-century leading female icons like Irene Dunne, Barbara Stanwyck, and Ann Sheridan, who equaled their male counterparts. Lucas wanted Debra Winger, but she was not interested, and Spielberg wanted his girlfriend Amy Irving, but she was unavailable. They also considered Stephanie Zimbalist, Barbara Hershey, Sean Young (who screen tested with Selleck), and Wendie Malick. Spielberg was aware of Karen Allen from her performance in Animal House (1978), portraying an independent female character, and she impressed him with her professionalism during auditions for Raiders. One of the first things Spielberg asked Allen was "how well do you spit?". Allen developed a backstory for Marion that included her mother's death and her relationship with Jones when she was 15–16, but Spielberg said it belonged in a different movie. Kasdan named Marion after his grandmother-in-law, and took Ravenwood from a Los Angeles street.

Belloq was intended to be a sophisticated villain to counter the "beer-drinking" hero. Spielberg cast Freeman after seeing him in the docudrama Death of a Princess (1980); Freeman's piercing eyes had captivated him. Giancarlo Giannini and singer Jacques Dutronc were also considered. Danny DeVito was approached to portray Sallah, described as a skinny, 5 ft (1.5 m) tall Egyptian like Gunga Din in Gunga Din (1939). DeVito could not participate because of scheduling conflicts with his sitcom Taxi and because his agent wanted too much money. Rhys-Davies was cast based on his performance in the 1980 miniseries Shōgun. Spielberg asked him to play the character as a mix of his Shōgun role and the character John Falstaff. Ronald Lacey was cast as Toht because he reminded Spielberg of actor Peter Lorre. Klaus Kinski was offered the role but chose to appear in the horror film Venom (1981) because it offered more money.

=== Filming ===
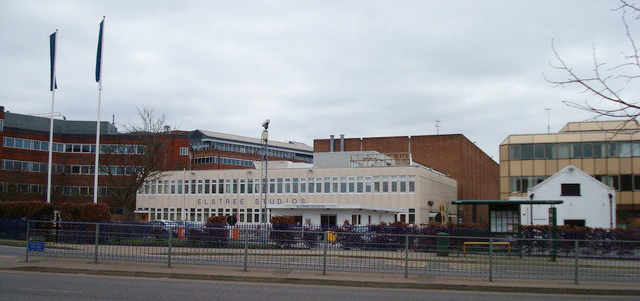
On-set filming location, Elstree Studios (pictured 2009) in Hertfordshire, England.

Principal photography began on June 23, 1980. Filming took place on location in La Rochelle in France, Tunisia in North Africa, and Hawaii, and on sets at Elstree Studios, England. Elstree was chosen because it was well-staffed with artists and technicians who had worked on Star Wars. On-location shooting cost around $100,000 a day in addition to crew salaries; sets cost an additional $4 million. The production could afford certain equipment only for a limited time, including a Panaglide camera stabilizer for smoother shots, and a camera crane for higher angles. To maintain the tight schedule, Spielberg said he "...didn't do 30 or 40 takes; usually only four... Had I had more time and money, it would have turned out a pretentious movie."

Filming began in La Rochelle, depicting the capture of the Bantu Wind by a Nazi U-boat. Watts borrowed a submarine from the war film Das Boot (1981) on condition it not be taken into deep waters. World War II German U-boat pens in La Rochelle represented the U-boat dock. An original coal-fired tramp steamer boat could not be found for filming, so an Egyptian boat found in an Irish port was decorated appropriately and sailed to France.

The production moved to Elstree Studios by June 30. Interiors included the scene featuring an imam deciphering the staff headpiece and the Peruvian temple. There were repeated delays while filming the Well of Souls scene: there were too few snakes, a lack of anti-venom, and director Stanley Kubrick's daughter Vivian called the Royal Society for the Prevention of Cruelty to Animals (RSPCA) about the treatment of the snakes. The interior of Jones's school was filmed at The Royal Masonic School for Girls in Rickmansworth, in Hertfordshire; the exterior was the University of the Pacific in California.

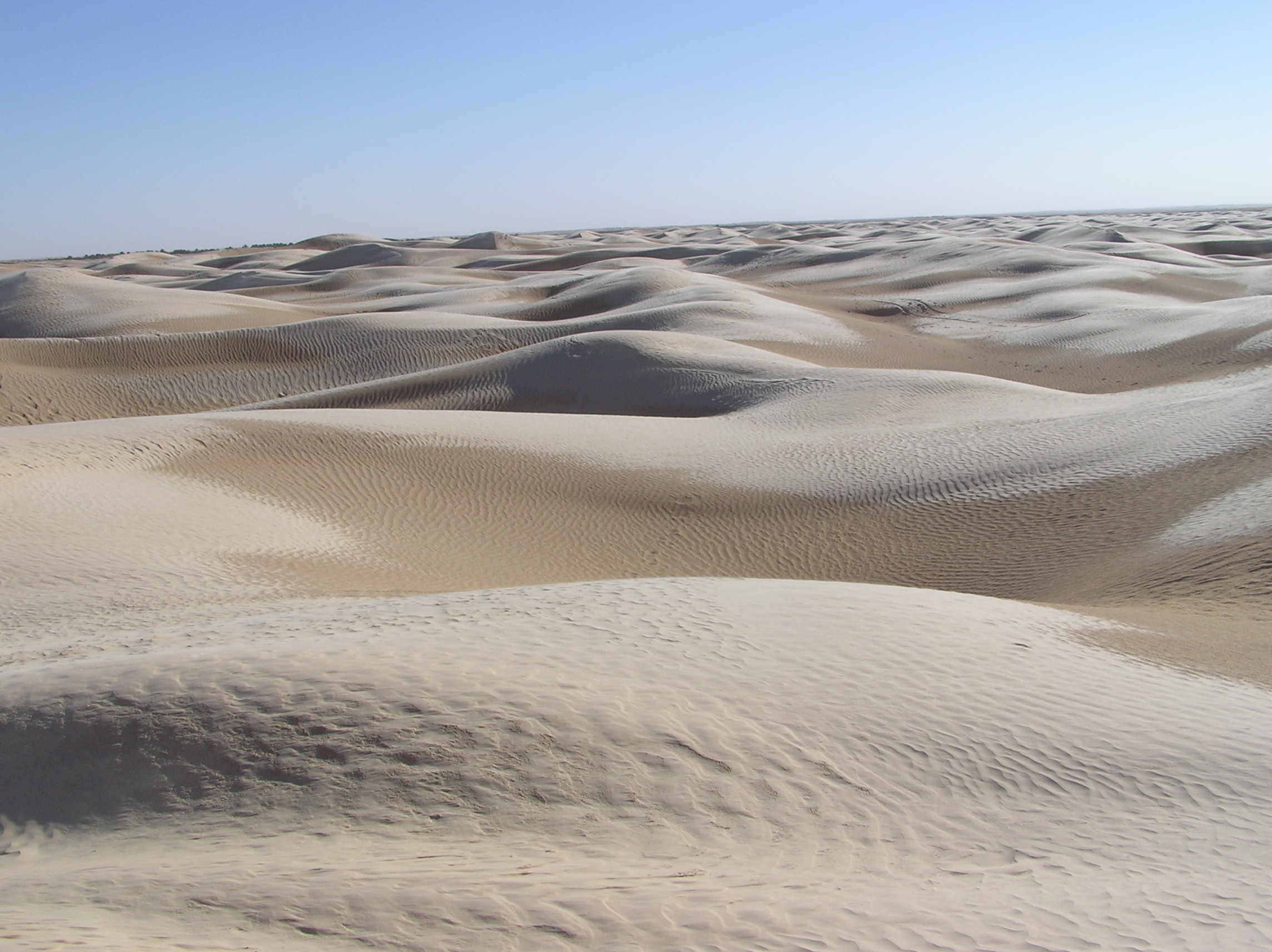
The Sahara Desert near the Tozeur oasis in Tunisia was the location of the Tanis dig site in the film.

Tunisia was used to portray Egypt. Spielberg described this phase as one of his worst filming experiences: the temperature was often over 130 °F (54 °C), and over 150 crew members became sick with amoebic dysentery from the local food. (Note: Attributed to multiple references:) Spielberg was one of the few to remain healthy because he ate food and water he brought from England. Lucas also suffered a severe sunburn and facial swelling. The Cairo village was filmed in the city of Kairouan. A day of filming was lost there because over 300 TV antennas had to be removed from the surrounding houses. Budget constraints affected Spielberg's desire to have 2,000 extras as diggers; he had to settle for 600. Stuntman Terry Richards, who portrayed the swordsman nonchalantly dispatched by Jones, spent weeks practicing sword skills for an extended fight scene. Ford was unable to perform for long periods while suffering from dysentery, and it was decided to shorten the fight scene significantly. The Sidi Bouhlel canyon near the city of Tozeur is where a rocket launcher-equipped Jones confronts the Nazis for the Ark. Lucas had used the canyon in Star Wars to portray the planet Tatooine. During the scene, a fly crawled onto Freeman's lip during his dialogue, but he continued to deliver his lines. Although it appeared to be eaten, Freeman clarified it flew away.

In late September, filming moved to Hawaii for exterior shots required for the film's opening scenes set in Peru. The Paramount logo dissolving into a natural mountain was an improvisation by Spielberg based on his own childhood habit of doing the same while making films; the mountain is Kalalea Mountain on the island of Kauaʻi. Ten locations were used across Hawaii, including the Huleia National Wildlife Refuge. Originally, the opening sequence was longer and more elaborate, featuring more dialogue and Jones fighting a guide who betrayed him; this was all removed for tighter pacing. Although the cave exterior was considered a perfect location, a nearby pool was a mosquito breeding ground; all the crew got bitten despite anti-mosquito equipment. The brown donkeys used for the trek suffered lameness. As replacements could not be sourced locally, a pair of gray donkeys were dyed brown with colored hairspray and flown by helicopter to the Nā Pali Coast State Park to finish the scene.

The loosely detailed script led to much improvisation; where the script described three people talking in a room, in the film it took place in a quarry alongside 500 extras. Scenes like a student of Jones's flashing the "Love You" message written across her eyelids and Marion putting on a dress to conceal a weapon were also improvised. Allen believed the latter scene focused on her character seducing Belloq, undermining her loyalty and love for Jones. She and Freeman collaborated to develop the idea of Marion getting Belloq drunk instead. Allen, Lacey, Freeman, and Rhys-Davies often spent time together between filming to talk and discuss their characters. Allen described Ford as a private person who would not discuss his character in detail, and it took her a while to adapt to his working style. Filming concluded in September 1980, after 73 days. Lucas described it as the film he had the fewest problems with because of the lack of studio interference.

=== Post-production ===
Post-production lasted about two months and focused mainly on special effects and pick-up shots. Spielberg's first cut was close to three hours long before he and Kahn re-edited it to just under two hours. Lucas was happy with this edit, but later asked if he could shorten the ending. He and Kahn collaborated on the edit; Spielberg said he was happy with their changes. The final cut of the film runs for 115 minutes. Marcia Lucas opined there was no emotional closure for Jones and Marion because she was absent following the closure of the Ark. Marcia is not credited in the film, but her suggestion led Spielberg to shoot a final exterior sequence on the steps of San Francisco City Hall showing Jones and Marion together.

Other changes included the addition of a scene where the Ark makes a humming noise in the Bantu Wind hold and the removal of a scene showing Jones holding on to the U-boat periscope to follow the Nazis; Spielberg thought it looked poor and hoped the audiences would not care how Jones accomplished the feat. Lucas removed a scene of a man fainting at the sight of Jones and Marion emerging from the Well of Souls because he thought the joke did not fit with the tone of the film. Shots of the Douglas DC-3 Jones and Marion use to fly out of Nepal were repurposed from the adventure film Lost Horizon (1973), and an establishing shot of the streets of Washington, D.C. was taken from The Hindenburg (1975). Spielberg justified the use of stock footage as cost-effective, and reasoned that only sharp-eyed viewers would notice. Special effects supervisor Richard Edlund claimed that the street scene was done with miniatures.

=== Music ===
John Williams composed the score for Raiders of the Lost Ark. He said the music did not have to be serious for the film and was instead theatrical and excessive. Williams spent a few weeks working on the Indiana Jones theme, more commonly known as "The Raiders March" that plays during the main character's heroic scenes. Two separate pieces were played for Spielberg, who wanted to use both. These pieces became the main theme and musical bridge of "The Raiders March".

For the romantic theme, Williams took inspiration from older films like the drama Now, Voyager (1942) to create something more emotionally monumental that he felt would contrast well with the film's humor and lighter moments. Williams used "dark" orchestral pieces to represent the actions of the Nazis, using the "seventh degree on the scale of the bottom". He said this signified a militaristic evil. To create something suitably biblical for the Ark of the Covenant, he used a mix of chorus and orchestra.

== Design ==
=== Stunts ===
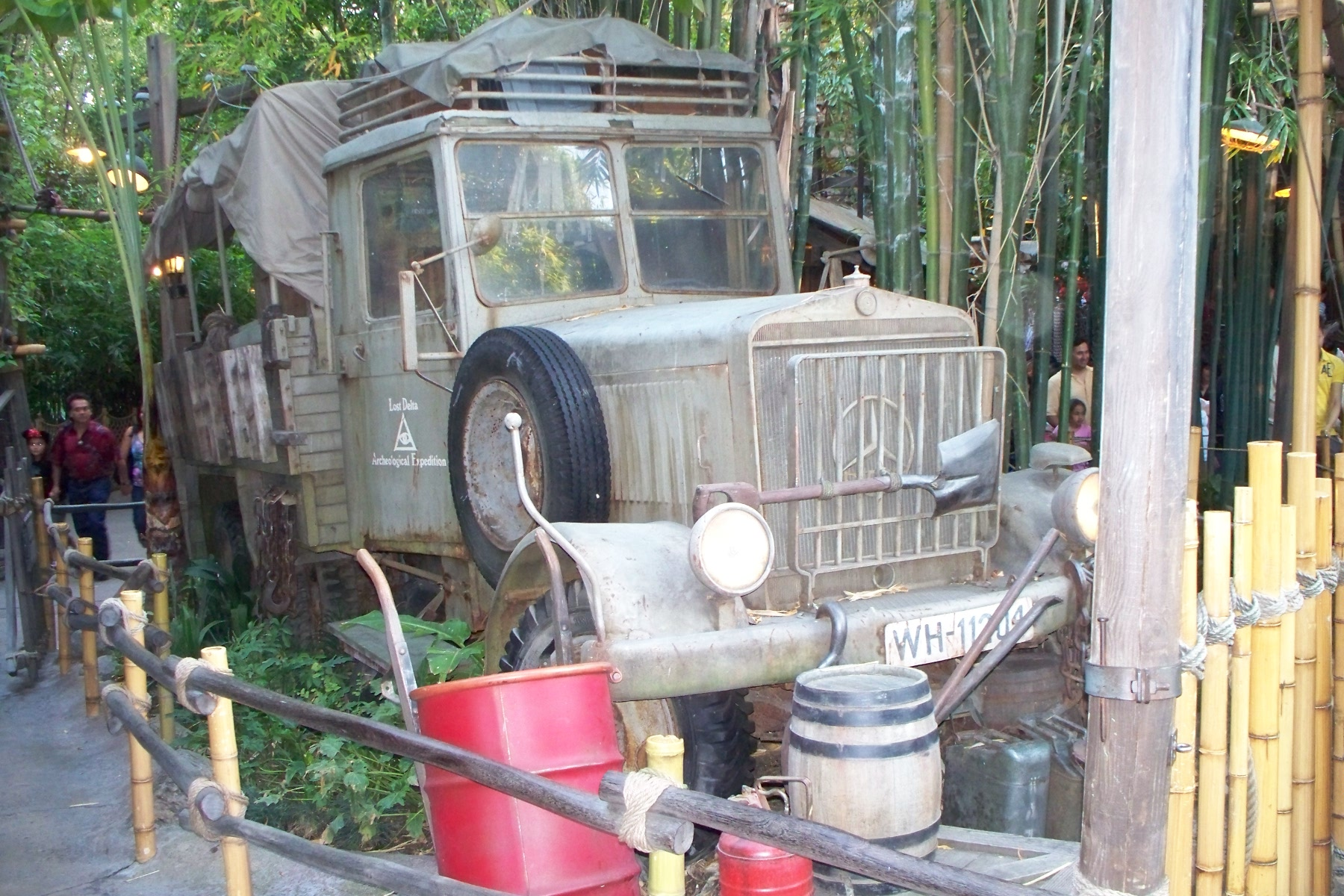
A 1930s Mercedes-Benz 2.5 ton diesel truck used in the film on display at Disneyland, California

The Peruvian temple interiors used in the film were life-sized sets. The giant boulder—made of fiberglass, plaster and wood—was designed to be 65 ft (20 m) wide, but this was reduced to 22 ft (6.7 m), with the resulting prop weighing 300 lb (140 kg). Spielberg liked the effect and had its ramp extended to give it more screen time. The boulder was controlled by a steel rod concealed in the wall by rubber rock outcroppings. Ford performed the stunt ten times for the different camera angles. Spielberg said he was an idiot for letting Ford do it, but it would not have looked as good with a stuntman concealing his face. Ford performed as many of his stunts as was allowed throughout Raiders, suffering various injuries. The tarantulas on Molina's body would not move because they were male and non-aggressive. A female spider was put on his chest to encourage movement. Abandoned ideas for the temple included a crushing wall trap and a pit concealed by spider-webs. The golden idol also had mechanically operated eyes that could follow Jones. For the last part of the scene where Jones flees by plane, the first take ended in near-disaster when the plane crashed from a height of 20 ft (6.1 m) because Ford's dangling leg was blocking the aircraft's right flap.

Filming of the Well of Souls scene was delayed initially by a lack of snakes. There were 500–600 snakes to use for close shots and some mechanical snakes for wider shots, but Spielberg wanted more. A request was made to snake handlers from around London and Europe who produced between 6,000 and 10,000 snakes in a few days. Afterward, they struggled to obtain anti-venom; with local supplies having expired, it had to be imported from India. Many of the snakes were harmless grass snakes or non-venomous pythons, but the cobras were positioned behind plexiglas to protect the cast and crew. Also present among the snakes were legless lizards. The stage doors were kept open during filming for quick access to a waiting ambulance. Spielberg recounted that Allen was so scared she could not scream on cue. He dropped a dead serpent on her to elicit a genuine reaction. Allen said she got used to the creatures after 3–4 days. Animal handler Steve Edge donned a dress and shaved his legs to stand in for Allen at specific points. Vivian Kubrick's complaint to the RSPCA about the perceived poor treatment of the snakes required production to cease while safeguards were added.

Reynolds and production artist Ron Cobb created the BV-38 flying wing based on the Horten Ho 229, the Northrop N-1M and the Vought V-173. Constructed by the British engineering firm Vickers, it was dismantled and shipped to Tunisia. It was not designed to be flight-worthy, only to serve as a source of danger from its propellers. The plane was abandoned in Tunisia and slowly dismantled over the following decade by souvenir hunters before being demolished. The fight between Jones and the German underneath the plane was mainly improvised; Spielberg had to restrain himself from making it too long as each new idea led to another. During the fight, the moving vehicle rolled over Ford's foot and towards his knee before it was stopped. It took 40 crew members to move it off of him. He avoided injury through a combination of the extreme Tunisian heat making the tire soft and the ground being covered in sand. Dysentery had left the production with a lack of stuntmen, and Spielberg had Marshall stand in as the flying wing pilot. The three-day shoot was one of Spielberg's more difficult scenes to film, and he was reported saying he wanted to go home.

Second unit director Michael D. Moore filmed most of the truck chase. Spielberg had not used a second director before but agreed to it as the scene would take a long time to film being set in multiple locations. Moore completed wider shots where stuntmen stood in for Ford. He closely followed Spielberg's storyboarding but innovated a few shots Spielberg considered improvements. Stuntman Glenn Randall suggested the scene of Jones traversing the underside of the truck. Ford sat in a concealed bicycle seat attached to the truck underside when clinging to its front. One of the convoy cars going over a cliff was a combination of matte painting background and stop motion animation of miniature figures falling out of the car.

=== Special effects ===
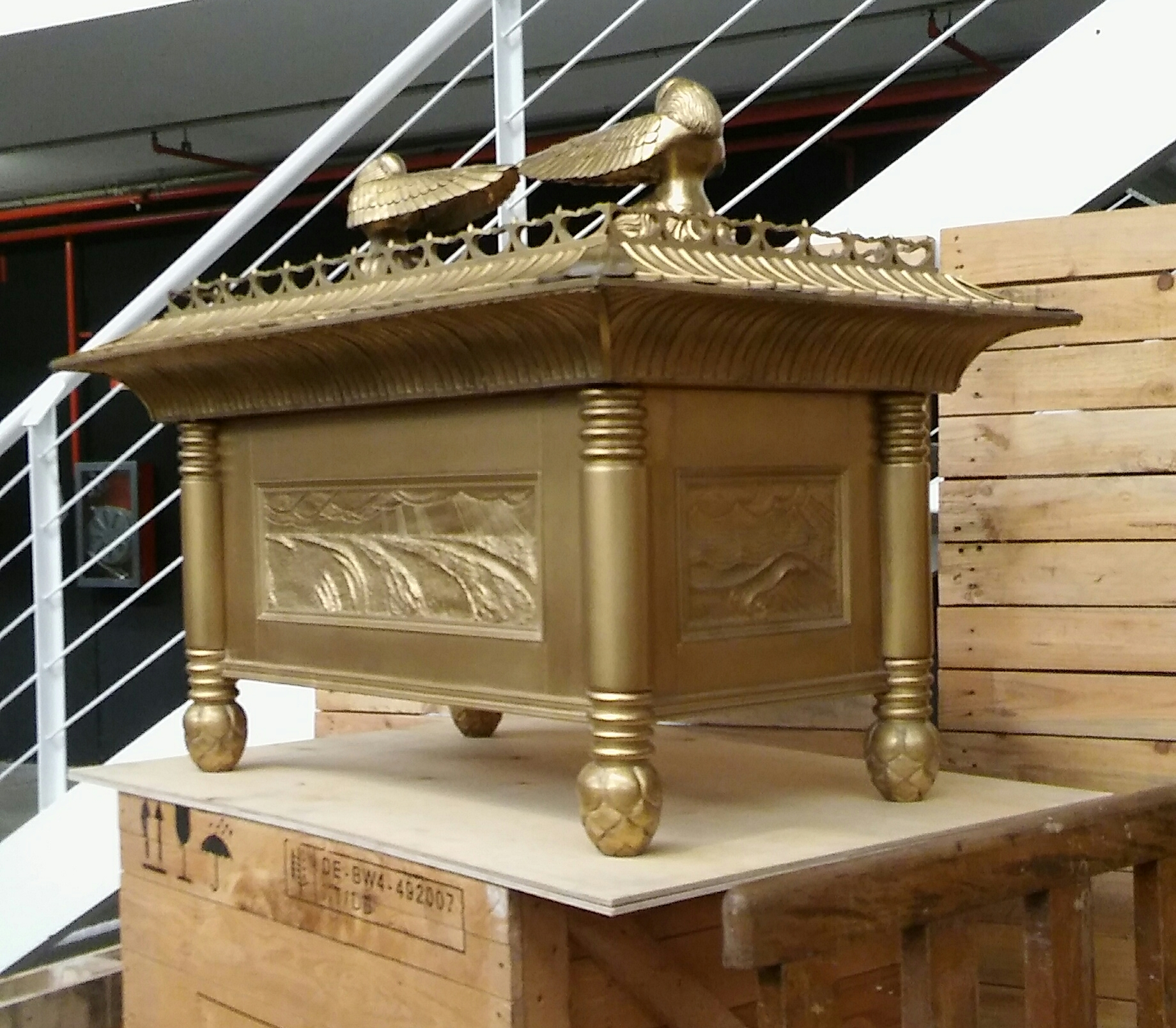
A replica of the Ark of the Covenant on display in 2016

Lucas's Industrial Light & Magic (ILM) handled the film's special effects, under the supervision of Richard Edlund. The team worked on both Raiders of the Lost Ark and the dark fantasy Dragonslayer (1981). Lucas felt special effects were a financially economical method of delivering a good film; as long as they were emotionally involved in the story, he said audiences would buy into even a poor special effect. Spielberg liked practical effects because he could regularly check the raw footage during filming, rather than waiting months for the completed composite effects.

Freeman said he had no idea what was happening when he opened the Ark. He was told to imagine something coming towards him and to scream. Special effects artist Steve Gawley created the Ark's spirits by suspending small robed puppets in a clouded water tank in front of a blue screen. They were shaken to create a natural movement that was composited into the live footage. A Lucasfilm receptionist, dressed in a long white robe, was suspended in the air in front of a blue screen for the close-up of the ghost. She was filmed moving away from the camera and the footage was reversed to create an inhuman movement. Her visage was composited with a skeletal model for the monstrous transformation.

Freeman, Lacey, and Kahler's death scenes were created using different models. A mold was made of Kahler's face; it was lined with bladders filled with air. Controlled by up to ten people, the air was removed to make the head shrivel. Special effects artist Chris Walas sculpted Lacey's melting face using different colored layers of gelatin placed over a carved, heat-resistant stone skull. Propane heaters were used to melt the gelatin and filmed using a slower-than-normal camera so the effect appears to take place rapidly when played at normal speed. Belloq's head mold contained a thin-plaster skull filled with blood bags and detritus. It was blown up using explosives, shotguns, and an air cannon. It took three attempts to get the desired effect. Belloq's death was considered so extreme the Motion Picture Association of America initially classified the film with an R rating restricting it to those over the age of 17 without an adult. Flames were superimposed over the scene to conceal the effect.

Kasdan scripted detailed montages during the transition between locations, but Spielberg saved money by showing a map and an animated line traveling between destinations. Skulls and rotting bodies made by chief make-up artist Tom Smith filled the Well of Souls catacombs. To get the monkey to perform a Nazi salute, the trainer hit it on the head to make it touch the affected area. When this did not work, the filmmakers hung a grape over its head to encourage it to reach up; it took 50 takes to capture. A partially deaf rat was used for the scene of the ark humming in the hold of the Bantu Wind, giving it a unique and unnatural head movement.

=== Visuals and sound ===
Matte paintings were used to create more elaborate backgrounds: these included the establishing shot of Marion's Nepalese bar and the warehouse where the Ark is later stored, the latter painted by Michael Pangrazio. Spielberg disliked the painting of the China Clipper plane (by Alan Maley) as he did not think it looked real against the water they had filmed. (Note: Attributed to multiple references:) Jones's attire—a leather jacket and khaki pants—was based on Humphrey Bogart's in The Treasure of the Sierra Madre (1948) and Charlton Heston in Secret of the Incas (1954). Costume designer Deborah Nadoolman Landis dumped boxes of hats on the floor for Ford to try on. After picking the right style, she purchased an Australian model she aged with Fuller's earth and mineral oil, and then scrunched beneath a bed. The hat allowed them to create a recognizable image even in silhouette. Designer Ralph McQuarrie was responsible for the Ark decorations.

Spielberg wanted a moodier film noir lighting style like in The Informer (1935). In contrast, Slocombe wanted to make things brighter and used backlighting to create a greater depth of field; Spielberg preferred his changes. Slocombe often employed natural light, using solar position predictions to plot a scene's layout. Spielberg liked the beams of sunlight glimpsed through scenery and tasked special effects artist Kit West with using a smoke machine to create artificial sunlight shards. For the bar fight, Spielberg wanted pitch-black shadows on the wall, but the lighting required to achieve this would have shrouded the actors' eyes; he settled for subtler shadings. He also wanted to illuminate the Well of Souls with a lighting effect through the ceiling opening, but once this was sealed it no longer made sense. The flaming torches used in the scene did not provide enough light, so he opted to use an artificial light source. Spielberg noted Allen always looked beautiful in her scenes because Slocombe spent twice as long setting up her lighting as he did Ford's.

Sound effects supervisor Ben Burtt recorded the film's many sounds. The snake slithering is a mix of Burtt running his hands through cheese casserole and wet sponges being dragged across grip tape; the rolling boulder is a Honda Civic driving down a gravel hill; and the Ark lid opening is the sound of a toilet cistern being opened. The Ark spirits are the cries of sea lions and dolphins filtered through a vocoder. Jones's revolver is the sound of a Winchester rifle firing, while his whip-crack was made by recording Ford using the whip.

== Release ==
=== Context ===
External videos
- Raiders of the Lost Ark theatrical trailer on YouTube

By the summer of 1981 (June–September), the film industry had been in decline for over a year. This was the result of few box office successes, rising film production costs, diminishing audiences, and increasing ticket prices. The season was predicted to be down 10% or $250 million against the previous year. Over 60 films were scheduled for release—more than the previous year—by studios eager to make the next blockbuster film. This increased competition to attract audiences, mainly those aged 12 to 24, at the most profitable time of the year.

The superhero film Superman II was expected to dominate the season, and based on industry experts and audience polling, films including History of the World, Part I, the latest James Bond film For Your Eyes Only, and The Great Muppet Caper, were also expected to perform well. Conversely, audience polling by CinemaScore showed little awareness or anticipation for Raiders until nationwide previews a week before its release. The New York Times reported Paramount had provided theater owners with a more beneficial deal than usual to ensure Raiders was screened in the best theaters and locations.

Featuring two camels, an elephant, and a python, the press event for the film cost $10,000. Film prints were supplied to theaters in lead-sealed containers to prevent tampering alongside a letter to theater managers stating they were responsible for any misuse of the film. This letter inspired a whistleblower at one theater to alert Paramount of the planned theft of a Raiders print to make pirated copies. The 1,200 film prints cost an estimated $1.7 million. The theatrical release poster was created by Richard Amsel.

=== Box office ===
In the United States (U.S.) and Canada, Raiders of the Lost Ark was released on June 12, 1981, in 1,078 theaters. The film earned $8.3 million—an average of $7,705 per theater, and finished as the number one film of the weekend, ahead of the debuts of Clash of the Titans ($6.6 million) and History of the World, Part I ($4.9 million). Audiences polled by CinemaScore during its opening weekend gave the film an average grade of "A+" on an A+ to F scale.

The film fell to the number three position in its second weekend with an additional gross of $8 million—a decline of only four percent—behind the debuts of The Cannonball Run ($11.8 million) and Superman II ($14.1 million). By its fourth week, Raiders began climbing box office charts, reaching the number two position with a gross of $7.3 million, behind Superman II ($10.9 million). In its sixth week, it regained the number one position with $6.4 million. The film spent most of the following nine weeks as the number one film, and forty-weeks straight as one of the top ten highest-grossing films. It was declared the top box office film of the summer by early September, with a total approximate gross of $125 million. Of this figure, $72 million was estimated to have been returned to the studio; the profit-sharing deal with Spielberg and Lucas meant that after marketing costs, Paramount had earned $23 million in profit.

The film remained a steady success; six months after its release, industry executives joked Raiders would be the year's big Christmas film. The film officially left theaters on March 18, 1982, although some were still playing it by July. Raiders earned an approximate total box office gross of $212.2 million, making it the highest-grossing film of 1981, ahead of On Golden Pond ($119.3 million), Superman II ($108.1 million), and Stripes ($85.3 million). An estimate by Box Office Mojo suggests over 77 million tickets were bought to see the film. Raiders remains the "leggiest" film ever released, referring to the difference between the highest-weekend gross and the time taken to achieve the overall total gross.

Outside the U.S. and Canada, Raiders earned a further $141.7 million, making it the highest-grossing film ahead of For Your Eyes Only ($140.5 million) and Superman II ($82.2 million). In total, the film earned a worldwide gross of $354 million, (Note: The 1981 box office gross of $354 million is equivalent to $1.25 billion in 2025.) making it the highest-grossing film of 1981 worldwide, again ahead of For Your Eyes Only ($195.3 million) and Superman II ($190.4 million).

Raiders has been re-released several times, first in July 1982, when it earned an additional $21.4 million and again in March 1983, when the film earned an additional $11.4 million. A remastered IMAX version, supervised by Spielberg, was released in 267 U.S. and Canadian theaters. The success of the release led to the run being extended to 300 additional theaters. These releases have raised the film's worldwide theatrical gross to an estimated $389.9 million.

The record $1.95 billion summer box-office of 1981 represented a 15.6% increase over 1980, with a 22.5% increase in ticket sales. This success was attributed mainly to Raiders and Superman II. The most successful film genres of the year offered fun, comedy, and escapism. Superman II broke box office records, but it was Raiders that earned the most money and played in theaters for over a year. The New York Times reported that audiences considered other films only if both Superman II and Raiders were sold out. It became one of the top-four highest-grossing films ever, a list dominated by Lucas and Spielberg with The Empire Strikes Back, Jaws, and Star Wars.

== Reception ==
=== Critical response ===
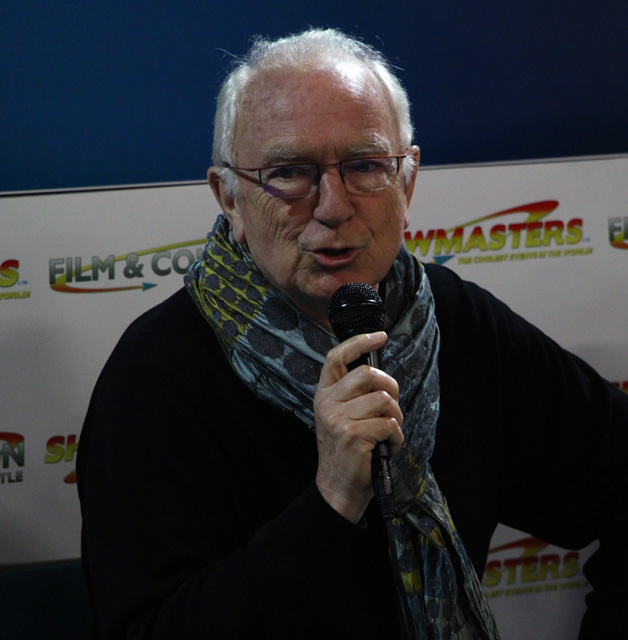
Actor Paul Freeman in 2016. He was singled out for praise by the otherwise critical Pauline Kael for continuing his performance after a fly appeared to crawl into his mouth.

Raiders of the Lost Ark was released to general critical acclaim. The National Board of Review and critic Vincent Canby listed it as one of the ten best films of the year. Canby labeled the film an "instant classic" and one of the most humorous and stylish American films ever made. He described it as having refined the old serial films into their most perfect form for a modern audience. Roger Ebert called it a series of "breathless and incredible" adventures inspired by and celebrating childhood stories told in comic books and movies. He concluded the film was successful in its singular goal of entertaining, creating an adventure epic in the vein of Star Wars, the James Bond films, and Superman. Writing for The Hollywood Reporter, Arthur Knight said a constant stream of thrills kept the film moving at a steady pace. Writing for Variety, Stephen Klain called the film "exhilarating escapist entertainment". He continued that the film successfully balanced action, comedy, and suspense with mystical mythologies. Michael Sragow described it as the "ultimate Saturday action matinee". Gene Siskel said it was as entertaining as a "commercial movie" could be, the kind of film that makes children excited about cinema.

Richard Schickel called it a return to form for Spielberg, demonstrating a competence not seen since Jaws. He described it as a film Walt Disney would have made were he still alive, featuring an "enchanting" combination of fantasy and cinematic movement. Stanley Kauffmann said while the film's thrills did work on him, the frequency eventually irritated him. He criticized the film's reliance on nostalgia and updating older films instead of innovating new ideas. Pauline Kael was critical of the film, saying Lucas and Spielberg had thought like marketers in creating a film that would appeal to the broadest masses. Kael said though Raiders was a sophisticated update of older serials, avoiding cliches with clever editing, it was too focused on surpassing each previous action spectacle to the detriment of characterization or plot progression. She opined the failure of 1941 had made Spielberg too cautious, and scenes evidenced he was rushing and not achieving the best possible take as in his previous work. Lucas later named a villain in his 1988 fantasy film Willow after Kael. Dave Kehr said the constant rush between setpieces felt monotonous. He also criticized the story for allowing the hero to choose to rescue the Ark over his romantic interest on multiple occasions, believing it made Indiana Jones difficult to support.

Ebert said the amusing and unusual characters elevated the film beyond just a technical accomplishment. He described Ford's performance as a taciturn and stubborn character in the vein of Humphrey Bogart in The Treasure of the Sierra Madre, but with the ability to laugh at himself. Klain said Ford's performance was "riveting", marking a major career highlight. Canby described Ford and Allen as both "endearingly resilient". Ebert said Allen gives Marion a charming toughness. Knight appreciated Marion did not become idiotic when the male star was in danger. His review concluded the character was the definition of an activist. Sragow said Allen's physical performance made her every bit the equal of Ford, and her vitality provided a positive counter to Ford's deadpan performance. Kael was critical of many cast performances, feeling they were stilted and heavily scripted. She singled out Freeman for praise, however, for continuing his performance after a fly crawled into his mouth; Freeman jokingly called it the best review of his career. Klain praised the film's performances, including Lacey's Toht, which he called "the most outrageously offensive Nazi stereotype seen on screen since World War II".

Canby, Knight and Variety singled out the opening of the Ark as one of the film's best special effects. Knight said the effects artists deserved a "special accolade" for their work. Canby described it as a visual display as "dazzling" as the denouement of Spielberg's Close Encounters of the Third Kind. Ebert said the truck chase stunt was the best he had ever seen, ahead of those in films like Bullitt (1968) and The French Connection (1971). Aljean Harmetz, Klain, and Siskel asserted the film's PG rating—meaning any child could see it unsupervised—was too lenient for such a scary film filled with a variety of on-screen deaths. An intermediate rating between PG and R, PG-13, would not be introduced until 1984, in part a response to the violence of the Indiana Jones prequel, Indiana Jones and the Temple of Doom. Some children were reported to have suffered nightmares afterward.

=== Awards and accolades ===
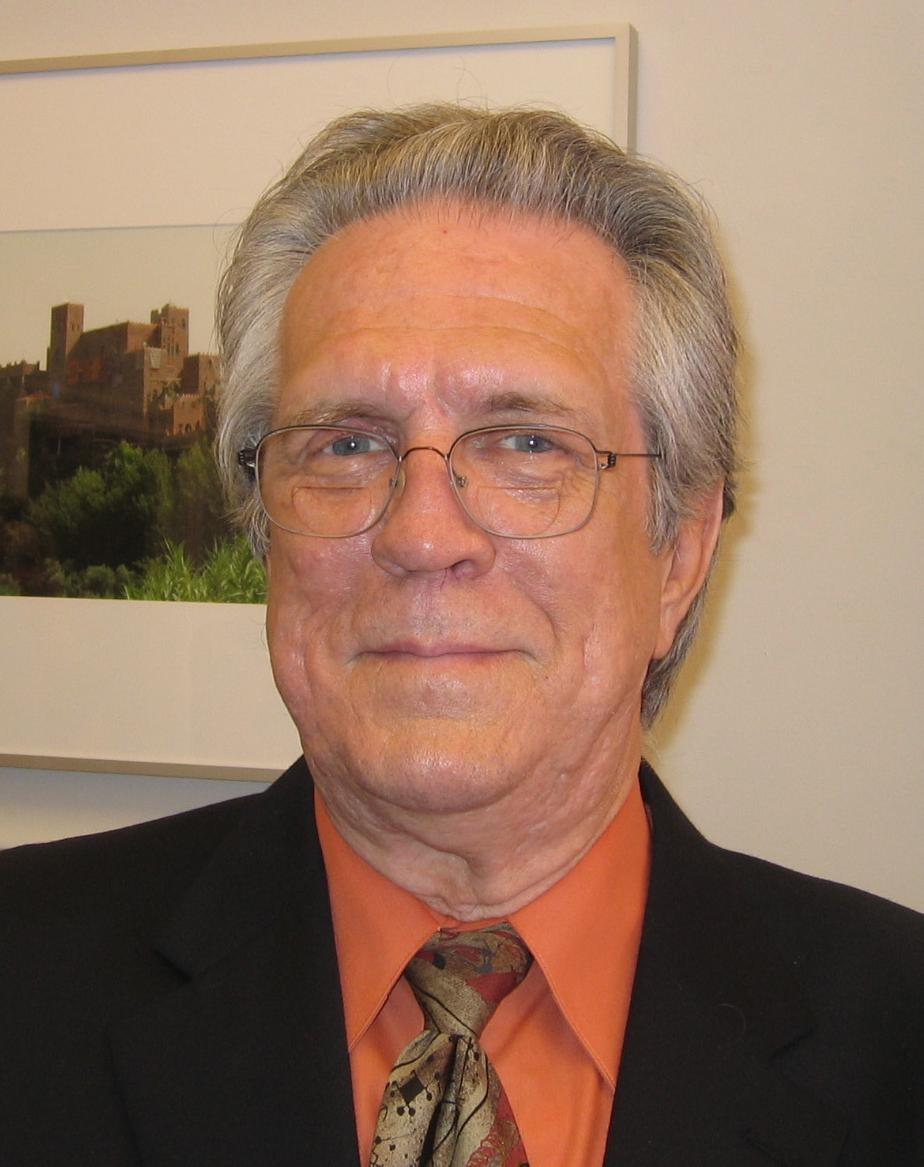
Richard Edlund won an Academy and Saturn Award for the film's visual effects.

At the 1982 Academy Awards, Raiders of the Lost Ark received five awards: Best Art Direction (Norman Reynolds, Leslie Dilley, and Michael D. Ford); Best Film Editing (Michael Kahn); Best Sound (Bill Varney, Steve Maslow, Gregg Landaker, and Roy Charman); Best Sound Editing (Ben Burtt and Richard L. Anderson); and Best Visual Effects (Richard Edlund, Kit West, Bruce Nicholson, and Joe Johnston). The film received a further four nominations: Best Picture; Best Director; Best Cinematography; and Best Original Score. It tied with the drama film Ragtime for the third-most nominations, behind On Golden Pond and Reds.

For the 39th Golden Globe Awards, Raiders received one nomination for Best Director. At the 9th Saturn Awards, Raiders won seven awards, including Best Fantasy Film, Best Actor (Ford), Best Actress (Allen), Best Director, Best Music (Williams), Best Writing (Kasdan), and Best Special Effects (Edlund). Spielberg received a Directors Guild Award nomination.

The 35th British Academy Film Awards earned the film one award for Best Production Design (Reynolds), and a further six nominations: Best Film; Best Supporting Actor for Elliott; Best Original Music; Best Cinematography; Best Editing; and Best Sound for Charman, Burtt, and Bill Varney. The film also received a Grammy Award for Williams' score, a People's Choice Award for Favorite Motion Picture, a Hugo Award for Best Dramatic Presentation, and a nomination for Best Original Screenplay at the 34th Writers Guild of America Awards.

== Post-release ==
=== Home media ===
In the early 1980s, the videocassette recorder (VCR) home video market was rapidly gaining popularity. In previous years, VHS sales were not a revenue source for studios, but by 1983 they could generate up to 13% of a film's total revenue; the U.S. and Canadian cassette rights could generate $500,000 alone. In November 1983, Paramount released a record 500,000 home video copies of Raiders, priced at $39.95. Paramount priced their home videos significantly lower than their competition, reasoning it would broaden the sales audience and promote home video watching. By September 1985, over one million copies of the film had sold, making it the bestselling VHS of its time. In 1991, McDonald's launched possibly "the largest video sales promotion...to date" during which videocassettes of the first three Indiana Jones movies were sold at their restaurants for $5.99 each. Almost 10 million cassettes of the Indiana Jones series had been sold by this point. This promotion was expected to sell at least five million more. By 2000, the film was marketed as Indiana Jones and the Raiders of the Lost Ark for consistency with other titles in the franchise.

In 2003, the film was released on DVD as a bundle with the other two films in the franchise. Like the VHS, it was a success, selling over one million units and becoming the fastest-selling DVD box set. This set introduced additional materials including Making the Films, a two-hour documentary about the making of the films including deleted scenes, and Behind the Scenes, a series of archival featurettes. The film and its sequels were released as a collection on Blu-ray disc in 2012, as Indiana Jones: The Complete Adventures. Spielberg worked on the films' restoration for the higher-quality format. This release included the additional content of previous releases. For its 40th anniversary in 2021, the film was released in a remastered 4K resolution Ultra HD Blu-ray based on the original film negative, as part of a boxset including the series' other films. This version was released individually in 2023.

=== Other media ===
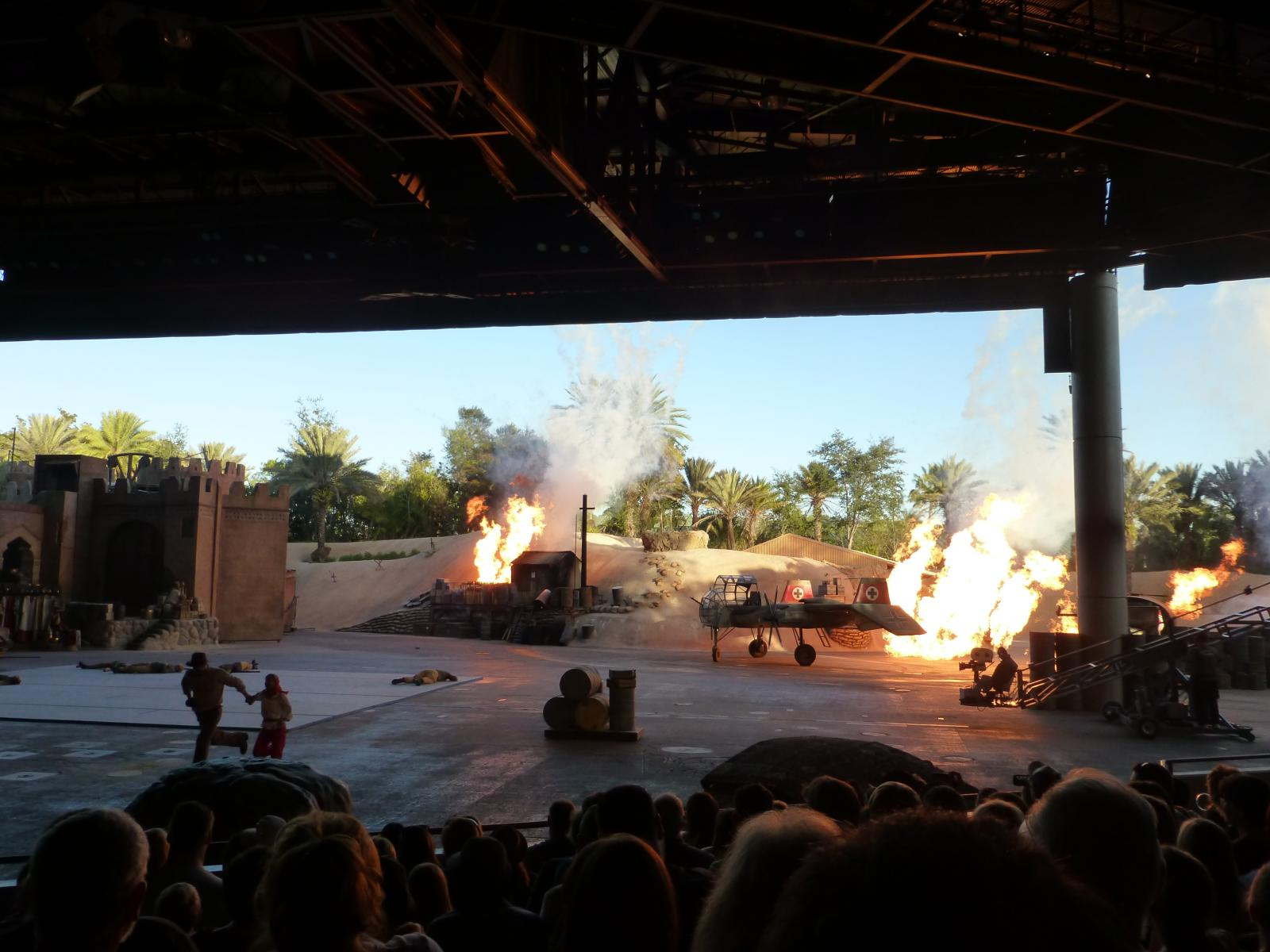
A scene from the Indiana Jones Epic Stunt Spectacular! stunt show depicting Jones and Marion fleeing an exploding flying wing

Raiders of the Lost Ark has been represented across a wide variety of merchandise, including comic books, video games, novels, Lego sets, action figures and vehicles, playsets, candles, and board games.

It has received several game adaptations. Raiders of the Lost Ark was released in 1982 for the Atari 2600 console. A pinball game, Indiana Jones: The Pinball Adventure, was released in 1993, and a platform game, Indiana Jones's Greatest Adventures, was released for the Super Nintendo Entertainment System the following year. Indiana Jones and the Infernal Machine (1999) includes a bonus level that returns players to the Peruvian temple. The Lego-themed adventure game Lego Indiana Jones: The Original Adventures (2008) and its 2009 sequel Lego Indiana Jones 2: The Adventure Continues represent the film and its sequels. A 1984 boardgame, The Adventures of Indiana Jones role playing game, was poorly received, and when the manufacturer lost the license later that decade, all remaining copies had to be burned. All that remained from the destruction were encased in plastic and turned into the Diana Jones Award—"...diana Jones" being the only legible part of the burnt remains.

A novelization of the film, written by Campbell Black, was released in 1981. The book was a worldwide sales success and included details not present in the film. Among them is Marion was aged 14 when she and Jones began their relationship, the staff of Ra headpiece has explicit instructions not to look at the opened Ark, and Brody finds Jones at home after having just entertained one of his students. Black, who was paid $35,000 plus royalties, sued Lucasfilm in 2005 for not paying him his percentage of the book sales profits. Marvel Comics produced a comic book adaptation of the film shortly after its release.

The Indiana Jones Epic Stunt Spectacular! is a live amusement show at Walt Disney World Resort, Florida, that has been in operation since 1989. It features several live stunts based on set pieces from the film. Raiders of the Lost Ark was also one of several films that made up the Great Movie Ride (1989–2017).

== Themes and analysis ==
=== Rejection of Nazism ===
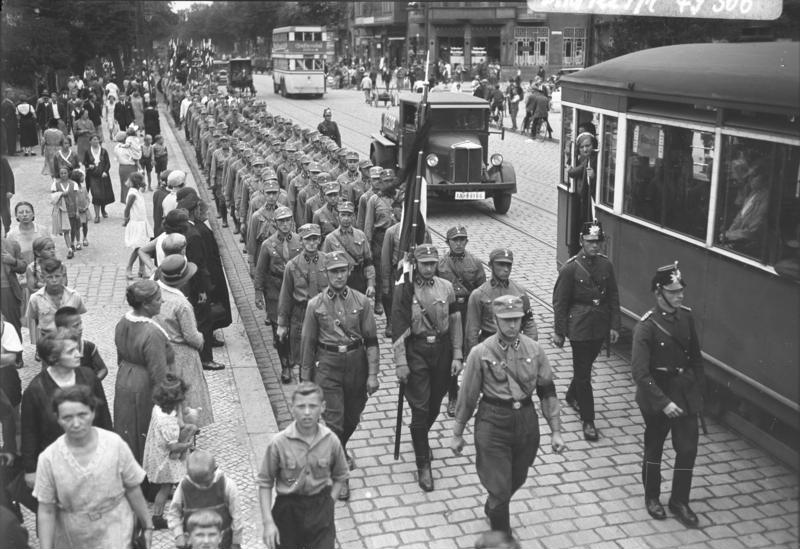
Nazi paramilitary troops marching in 1932 Spandau, Germany. Raiders can be seen as a form of revenge for the Jewish people, showing the rejection of the Nazis by God.

Raiders can be interpreted as a Jewish fantasy about punishing the Nazis for the Holocaust. Spielberg is Jewish, and the Ark is a Jewish artifact described as holding the Ten Commandments passed down to the Jewish people by God. In biblical descriptions, the Ark is a gold-plated wooden box that must be carried with poles because it is too holy to be touched. Although the Nazi regime persecuted the Jewish people, in the film, they needed to use a Jewish artifact to subjugate the world; however, the artifact was too pure and holy for them to touch and actively rejected them by destroying their symbol emblazoned on the Ark's transportation crate while leaving the crate itself unharmed. Eventually, it also destroys the Nazi forces that open it. The Nazis are stopped by the literal intervention of Godly power that leaves the perceived protagonists unharmed.

In another scene, Jones falls underneath a moving truck when its hood-ornament, a Mercedes logo, snaps, mocking Mercedes' involvement in aiding the Nazis. Elizabeth Hirschman identified elements of the metaphysical, believing the standard heroic quest was offset by the religious importance of the Ark, an item of Judeo-Christian belief. The image of God is one that is inherently on the side of the good, and the destruction of the Nazi villains draws parallels to Yahweh visiting plagues on Egypt for enslaving the Israelites.

=== Cinematic homage ===
Raiders of the Lost Ark is a pastiche of cinematic history, inspired by and referring to many films. Spielberg stated explicitly the film is about movies and designed as a tribute to filmmaking. Alongside directly referred inspirations like early 20th-century serials, the film contains references to Citizen Kane (1941), the film noir Kiss Me Deadly (1955), the samurai film Yojimbo (1961), and the epic Lawrence of Arabia (1962), among others. Citizen Kane is referred to directly in Raiders's last scene where the Ark is secured in a vast warehouse, a fate similar to that of the beloved childhood sled belonging to Citizen Kane's principal character. Raiders also refers to several of Lucas's own films: the translation of the German U-boat announcement is "1138", a reference to science fiction film THX 1138 (1971); and numerous nods to Star Wars including the characters of R2-D2 and C-3PO appearing as hieroglyphs inside the Well of Souls. Richard Crinkley recounted audience members of King David (1985) associated its use of the Ark explicitly with Raiders instead of its biblical origins. He deemed this an example of "cinemate visual literacy", an increasing number of people educated by visual media rather than text.

=== Sociology ===
One of the film's themes—shared with Superman II (released the same year in the United States)—has been interpreted as American security being put at risk. These films are emblematic of their time and the contemporary fears of American citizens. The Nazi characters are based on a former threat to America, and like Superman II, Raiders requires the intervention of a superhuman character to prevent destruction at the hands of enemy forces—a character audiences can admire, but never possibly emulate. Janet Maslin argues that the fantasy of these films and the larger-than-life characters are designed to satisfy audiences who do not want to reflect on the world around them. Jones is striving to recover the Ark both to stop the Nazis but also for personal glory, but the film never dwells on the regular people around the world who would be affected by an invincible Nazi army.

Raiders offers a counter to the American national embarrassments of the controversial Vietnam War (1955–1975), the Watergate scandal (1972), a recession, and the growing influence of foreign nations. The period setting of the film also presents audiences with a time tinged in romantic nostalgia and filled with the possibility for adventure. Robin Wood wrote that Raiders, Superman, and Star Wars provide a familiar, comforting content using the nostalgic memories of the older serial films of which they are derivative, presenting an idealized vision of older traditional values. Wood opined the purpose of this was to subdue contemporary radical social movements eager for change. Jennifer Barker suggested that Raiders offers audiences what they want, and does not challenge their values or beliefs as anything but correct.

The macho male action hero archetype of the era, conveyed by Jones, can also be seen as reinforcing traditional masculinity in the face of growing feminism. Describing the typical interpretation of this archetype, Latham Hunter said films such as Raiders, Lethal Weapon (1987), and Die Hard (1988) evolve the everyman character into someone who can overcome impossible odds and promote American might. Jones is an American hero who steps in reluctantly to save the world by overcoming almost exclusively foreign enemies. Barker argues that Jones is an individualist placed in opposition to a fascist or totalitarian regime, making Raiders a "conservative serial fantasy" film. Hunter believed this focus on masculinity was short sighted, and these films succeeded because they offered escapism from reality, and presented an outclassed hero who reflected the audiences' own feelings of powerlessness.

=== Archaeology ===
Jones has been criticized as a poor portrayal of an archaeologist and that his actions amount to theft. Archaeologist Winifred Creamer described Jones as the "worst thing to happen to archaeology" as he "walks a fine line between what's an archaeologist and what's a professional looter". Kevin McGeough wrote that the archetypal film archaeologist in older films was never the hero, but often a subject to be saved or conquered by the actual hero. Jones is imbued with the self-reliance and physical competence of the traditional hero, but with an intelligence that is recognized and celebrated, setting him apart from older heroes. Even so, Jones is hunting the Ark, in part, for personal glory attached to its recovery. When given the opportunity to destroy it to prevent its misuse, Belloq calls his bluff, and Jones backs down. Belloq suggests he is a skewed reflection of Jones, and only a small change would turn Jones into Belloq.

Several scholars have interpreted Raiders of the Lost Ark through the lens of colonialism. Drawing on earlier work by Ella Shohat, Nigel Morris, and others, Tatiana Prorokova argues that Indiana Jones occupies the role of a white Western colonizer whose archaeological expeditions involve removing culturally significant artifacts from non-Western societies for preservation in Western institutions. She argues that Jones' dismissal of the Ark's supernatural significance reduces it to an object suitable for Western museum collections, while his insistence that "it belongs in a museum" can be viewed from a decolonial perspective as reflecting the removal of cultural artifacts from their place of origin. Prorokova further argues that the film presents non-white populations as dependent upon or subordinate to Western protagonists while positioning Jones as the legitimate protector of the Ark. Prorokova, drawing on Morris, concludes that Jones represents the United States' assumed right to act as protector of the Ark.

== Legacy ==
Raiders of the Lost Ark has had a lasting effect on popular culture. It is considered a touchstone of modern cinema, creating a film framework still emulated by other films. Spielberg has said he considers it the most perfect film of the series because he never wanted to modify it or change anything about it.

Ford's performance led to his casting in the 1982 science fiction cult classic film Blade Runner. Kasdan became one of the most in-demand writers in Hollywood, and helped write Lucas's Star Wars sequel, The Empire Strikes Back (1980). Despite opening new opportunities for Allen, she expressed disappointment with the film because her character was motivated more by her relationship with Jones and financial gain than with her father and his obsession with the Ark. She unsuccessfully lobbied for rewrites to address this and explore her character further. Even so, Allen affirmed that many women and girls had appreciated and been inspired by her character. Forty years after the film's release, Allen affirmed she still received positive feedback from young women. Shortly after the film's release, Stanley Rader and Robert Kuhn filed a lawsuit against the filmmakers for $210 million alleging the film was based on Ark, a screenplay and unpublished novel by Kuhn. The outcome of this lawsuit is unknown.

The film led to an increase in students studying archaeology, and many modern archaeologists have cited the film as an inspiration. Rhys-Davies said he had met over 150 lecturers, professors, and archaeologists who told him their interest in the field began with the film. The original Indiana Jones costume hat and jacket were stored indiscriminately after filming, at Lucas's Skywalker Ranch, until 2012. Nadoolman Landis recovered the items to be exhibited as part of a Hollywood costume display at the Victoria and Albert Museum in London.

=== Cultural influence ===
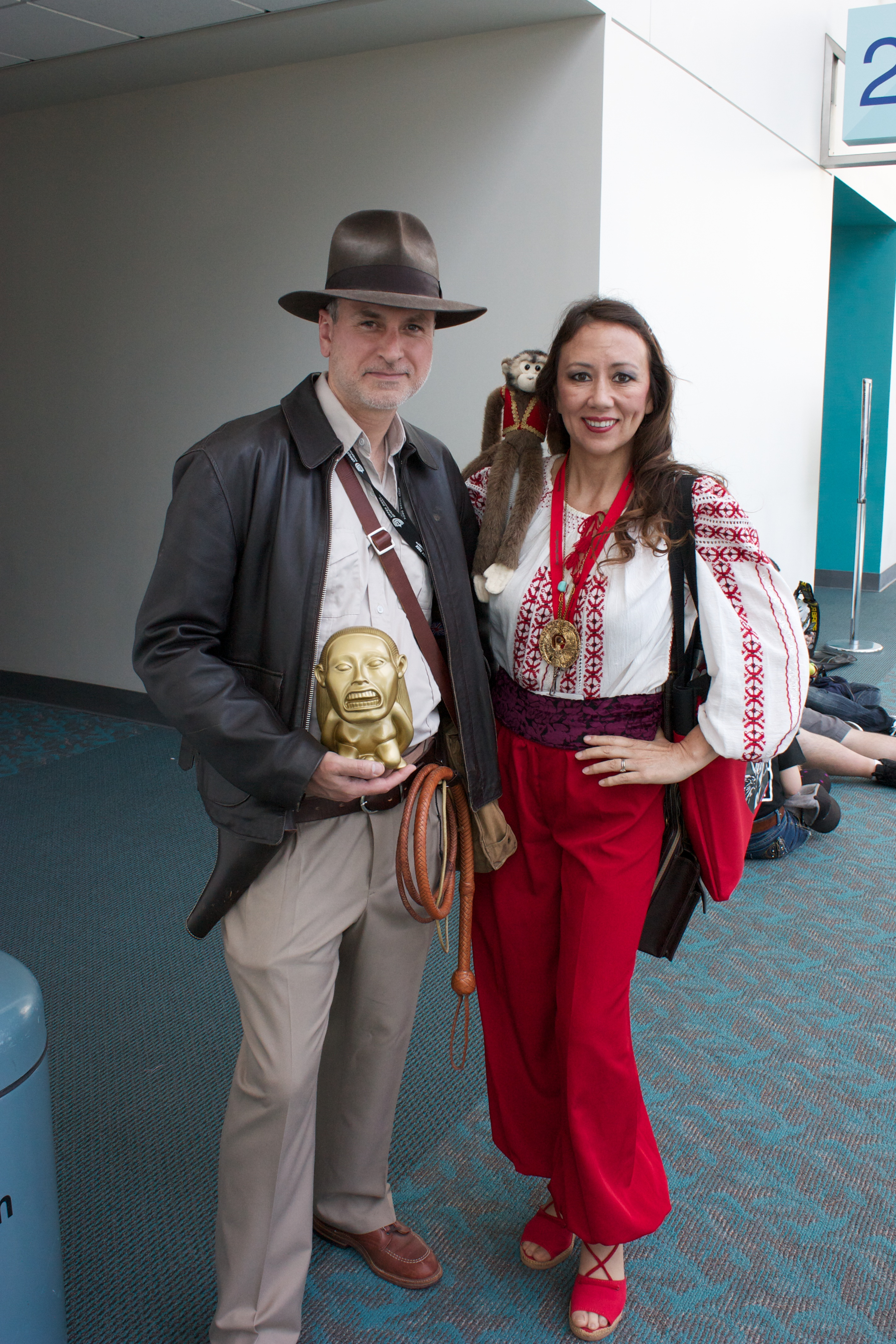
Fans dressed as Indiana Jones and Marion Ravenwood in 2011 at San Diego Comic-Con

In 1999, the United States Library of Congress selected the film to be preserved in the National Film Registry for being culturally, historically, or aesthetically significant. Assessing the film's legacy in 1997, Bernard Weinraub, opined "the decline in the traditional family G-rated film, for 'general' audiences, probably began..." with Raiders of the Lost Ark. He continued, "whether by accident or design... the filmmakers made a comic nonstop action film intended mostly for adults but also for children". Lucas's frequent collaborator Gary Kurtz said that Raiders of the Lost Ark marked the turning point where Lucas became convinced that audiences cared more about "the roller-coaster ride" than the story.

Authors, actors, and filmmakers have spoken of their appreciation for Raiders of the Lost Ark or cited it as an inspiration in their own careers, including Chris Carter, Hugh Jackman, Glen Powell, Simon Kinberg, Jon Turteltaub, Michael Bay, Dan Brown, M. Night Shyamalan and Joe Johnston. The experience had an explicit influence on Johnston's directorial effort Captain America: The First Avenger (2011), including character designs. Director Steven Soderbergh released a black-and-white edit of the film in 2014, removing all the original sounds, intending for viewers to focus on Spielberg's staging and editing. During the COVID-19 pandemic, it was among the action films director James Gunn recommended people watch, and one of the 35 films recommended by The Independent.

The film has inspired or been referred to in other media including film, television shows, and video games. Between 1982 and 1989, in Ocean Springs, Mississippi, children Chris Strompolos, Eric Zala, and Jayson Lamb made an amateur remake of the film, Raiders of the Lost Ark: The Adaptation. Spielberg congratulated the trio on their accomplishment.

=== Critical reassessment ===
Raiders of the Lost Ark is considered one of the greatest films ever made. As part of his The Great Movies series, Ebert said while the special effects had not aged well, they were perfect for this type of film. He concluded it was a "whiz-bang slamarama" made with "heedless joy". The British Film Institute called it one of the ten greatest action films of all time, saying "for all its barnstorming staging and boy's-own-adventure larks, it's refreshing Indy's greatest foil comes in three dimensions ... the hard-drinking, wise-cracking, upstagingly brilliant Karen Allen". A 2014 poll of 2,120 entertainment-industry members by The Hollywood Reporter ranked it the thirteenth best film ever made. It is also listed in the film reference book 1001 Movies You Must See Before You Die.

On Rotten Tomatoes, the film holds a 94% approval rating from the aggregated reviews of 157 critics, with an average rating of 9.3/10. The consensus reads, "Featuring bravura set pieces, sly humor, and white-knuckle action, Raiders of the Lost Ark is one of the most consummately entertaining adventure pictures of all time." The film has a score of 86 out of 100 on Metacritic based on 15 critics, indicating "universal acclaim". In 2005, the Writers Guild of America's (WGA) listed the film's screenplay as the forty-second greatest screenplay of the preceding 75 years on their 101 Greatest Screenplays list. Empire listed the film at number two on its 2008 list of the 500 Greatest Movies of All Time, behind the 1972 crime film The Godfather. They said, "no adventure movie is quite so efficiently entertaining". In 1997, the American Film Institute (AFI) ranked Raiders number 60 on its 100 Years...100 Movies list recognizing the best American films. They reassessed to number 66 in the 2007 anniversary edition. On the AFI's list of the 100 Best Thrills, the film was ranked number 10, and the 2003 list of the 100 Best Heroes & Villains ranked the Indiana Jones character as the number two hero, behind Atticus Finch from To Kill a Mockingbird (1962).

Several publications have ranked it as one of the greatest films of all time, including number two by Empire, number five by Time Out, and number 19 by MSN. It has also appeared on lists of the best action films, including number two by IGN, number nine by Time Out (down from number two in an earlier ranking) and number 11 by The Guardian and The Daily Telegraph. IGN also named it the best action film of the 1980s. Rotten Tomatoes and Esquire have labeled it one of the greatest adventure films. Film critic Bilge Ebiri, writing for Rolling Stone, considered it the best film in Spielberg's filmography as of 2018, stating that "Its effects and technique are dazzling; it's a perfect blend of jaw-dropping spectacle and the sort of actor-driven movie-movie moments that are redolent of Golden-Age-of-Hollywood classics; and it's as perfect a piece of pure, uncut entertainment as anyone has produced in the last few decades."

Channel 4 viewers in the United Kingdom ranked Raiders as the 20th best family film of all time in 2005. In the 2010s, Empire magazine readers named it the seventh-best film of all time, and it was ranked the sixteenth best film of all time, based on IMDb and Rotten Tomatoes user votes and critical ratings. Readers of the Los Angeles Times voted it the number one summer film, ahead of competition including Jaws and Alien (1979).

A 2013 episode of the sitcom The Big Bang Theory ("The Raiders Minimization") argues that Jones accomplishes nothing in Raiders, as the Nazis would have eventually found the Ark, opened it, and died regardless of Jones's actions. An essay by Esquire's Matt Pomroy agreed, with the caveat that Marion would have almost certainly died at Toht's hands, and the Ark would have been flown to Germany on the Flying Wing and opened for Hitler, likely killing him. However, Jones's involvement ensures the Americans secure the Ark, preventing the Germans from using it.

== Sequels and spin-offs ==
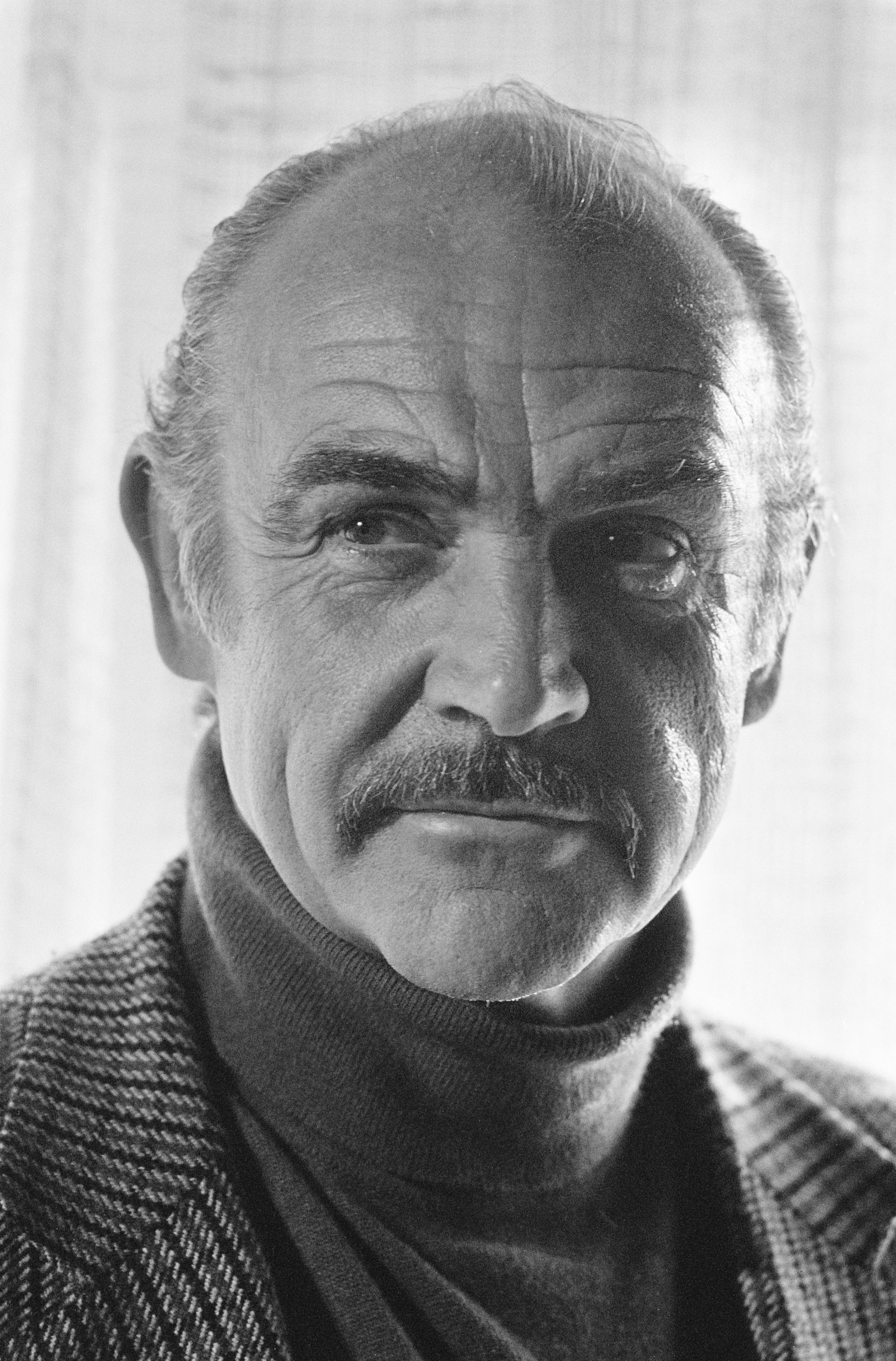
The actor Sean Connery in 1983. He was introduced as Indiana Jones's father, Henry, in Indiana Jones and the Last Crusade

The success of Raiders of the Lost Ark has spawned four other films. Indiana Jones and the Temple of Doom was in development by 1982, while the original was still in theaters. A narrative prequel to Raiders, Temple of Doom follows Jones's quest to recover sacred stones and liberate the slaves of a Thuggee cult leader. The film became one of the highest-grossing films of 1984 and broke box office records, but fared less well with critics who accused it of racism, sexism, and containing content inappropriate for child audiences.

A narrative sequel to Raiders, Indiana Jones and the Last Crusade, was released in 1989. It serves as the final film of the original trilogy and follows Jones and his father, portrayed by Sean Connery, on a quest to recover the Holy Grail. Like its predecessor, The Last Crusade broke box office records, becoming one of the year's highest-grossing films. It was also well received by critics. Spielberg has said the film was, in part, an "apology" for the reception to Temple of Doom. Following the conclusion of the film series, Lucas developed a television series, The Young Indiana Jones Chronicles (1992–1993), featuring Ford and other actors as Jones at different ages.

A fourth film was released in 2008, titled Indiana Jones and the Kingdom of the Crystal Skull. It features the return of Allen as Marion Ravenwood and introduces Shia LaBeouf as her and Jones's son. The setting moved from the 1930s to the 1950s, pitting Jones against Russians to recover a crystal skull. The film was a financial success but polarized critics and fans. As with Temple of Doom, Lucas and Spielberg have defended the film and apologized for its reception. A fifth film, Indiana Jones and the Dial of Destiny, was released in June 2023.

Novels, comic books, and video games have also been released detailing the further adventures of Indiana Jones and his supporting cast from the films. Often set before and after the events of the films, these globe-spanning tales depict Jones's first marriage, and his adventures to discover the Spear of Destiny, Merlin, an Infernal Machine in the Tower of Babel, the Covenant of Buddha, the staff of Moses, the Philosopher's Stone, dinosaurs, a Unicorn horn, the Oracle of Delphi, the secrets of the Sphinx, Noah's Ark, and the fate of Atlantis. Jones is sometimes aided by Sallah in his conflicts against Belloq and Lao Che (from Temple of Doom), among others.

== Works cited ==
- Barker, Jennifer (2008). "'A Hero Will Rise': The Myth of the Fascist Man in Fight Club and Gladiator". Literature/Film Quarterly. 36 (3). Salisbury, Maryland: Salisbury University. ProQuest 226986979.
- "CinemaScore". The Spokesman-Review. Spokane, Washington: William Stacey Cowles. August 28, 1981. p. 7.
- Crinkley, Richmond (July–August 1985). "The Ark of the Cinemate". Film Comment. 21 (4). New York City: Film at Lincoln Center. ProQuest 210241430.
- Ginsberg, Steven (July 20, 1982). "Spielberg King of B.O. Mountain". Daily Variety. Los Angeles. p. 1.
- Hirschman, Elizabeth (Fall 2001). "Legends in Our Own Time: How Motion Pictures And Television Shows Fulfill The Functions Of Myth". The American Journal of Semiotics. 17 (3). Charlottesville, Virginia: Philosophy Documentation Center: 7–9, 12–46. doi:10.5840/ajs200117329. ProQuest 213749767.
- Hunter, Latham (March 2003). "The Celluloid Cubicle: Regressive Constructions of Masculinity in 1990s Office Movies". The Journal of American Culture. 26 (1). Hoboken, New Jersey: Wiley-Blackwell: 71–86. doi:10.1111/1542-734X.00075. ProQuest 200624872.
- McGeough, Kevin (September–December 2006). "Heroes, Mummies, and Treasure: Near Eastern Archaeology in the Movies". Near Eastern Archaeology. 68 (3/4). Chicago, Illinois: University of Chicago Press: 174–185. doi:10.1086/NEA25067670. S2CID 166381712. ProQuest 221537348.
- Morris, Nigel (2007). "Chapter Six - Raiders of the Lost Ark: Lights, Camera, Action". The Cinema of Steven Spielberg. New York City: Columbia University Press. ISBN 9781904764885.
- Prorokova, Tatiana (2020). "Translocations, Cultural Geography and Anthropological Imperialism in Raiders of the Lost Ark". In Randy Laist (ed.). Excavating Indiana Jones: Essays on the Films and Franchise. Jefferson, North Carolina: McFarland & Company. pp. 51–63. ISBN 9781476639727.
- Schneider, Steven Jay (2013). "1980s". 1001 Movies You Must See Before You Die. Boston, Massachusetts: Murdoch Books. ISBN 9780764166136.
- Yockey, Matt (Spring 2008). "Somewhere in Time: Utopia and the Return of Superman". The Velvet Light Trap. 61 (61). Austin, Texas: University of Texas Press: 26–37. doi:10.1353/vlt.2008.0007. S2CID 190119420. ProQuest 222840506.
