= Iso-elastic =

In engineering, iso-elastic refers to a system of elastic and tensile parts (springs and pulleys) which are arranged in a configuration which isolates physical motion at one end in order to minimize or prevent similar motion from occurring at the other end. This type of device must be able to maintain angular direction and load-bearing over a large range of motion.

The most prominent use of an iso-elastic system is in the supporting armature of a Steadicam, used to isolate a film or video camera from the operator's movements. Steadicam arms all work in a fashion similar to a spring lamp since each arm has two sections (similar to and labelled like a human arm); both the upper and fore-arm sections consist of a parallelogram with a diagonal iso-elastic cable-pulley-spring system. The iso-elastic system is tensioned to counteract the weight of the camera and steadicam sled. This tensioning allows the camera and operator to move vertically and independently of each other. For example, as the operator runs, the bouncing of his body is absorbed by the springs, keeping the camera steady. The arm also has unsprung hinges at both ends of each arm allowing it to bend in the horizontal plane (just like your elbow, not like a spring lamp).

To understand how an iso-elastic system works, we must first understand how springs work. The tension (elastic force) in a spring is proportional to its extension according to Hooke's law. This means that if a weight is hung on a spring it will oscillate with simple harmonic motion about its balance point; when the weight is above the balance point the spring's tension is reduced so the weight falls due to gravity, and when the weight is below the balance point the spring's tension will pull it back upwards.

If a simple spring system were used in a steadicam, then as the operator moved vertically, the camera would be subject to simple harmonic motion, and bounce up and down. To counteract this tendency, an iso-elastic system is employed.

The springs used are large, stiff springs with a high modulus of elasticity, and they are highly tensioned. A compound pulley system is then used so that the large force exerted by the spring can be divided by a factor of five, for example, so the cable exiting the pulley system will have only moderate tension. Most importantly, however, when the cable is drawn in or out the extension of the spring changes by only a fifth of that distance, so that the tension force of the spring will not change much. The result is that the spring-pulley system can produce a fairly constant tension in the cable over a large range of movement.

The almost constant force exerted by an iso-elastic system is employed in the armature of a steadicam, to counteract the constant force of gravity on the camera's and mount's mass. The result is that the weight of the camera is almost exactly balanced by the tension force throughout the entire range of vertical movement, so even when the operator jumps vertically, the camera will retain its vertical position due to inertia, but remain balanced, just with the armature at a different angle.

As a result, the camera doesn't bounce up to the 'balanced' position after a move, for example when the operator steps up onto a curb from the road. This allows the camera to be more isolated and independent of the operator's moves. The operator can of course deliberately move the camera up or down, if desired. In reality however camera operators find it preferable for the arm to not be perfectly iso-elastic so that the camera will naturally rise to a comfortable operating height; the springs will be tensioned so this only happens very slowly and without bouncing so as to maintain the smoothness of the camera's motion."

== See also ==
- Precision engineering
