= Steadicam =

Motion picture camera stabilizer mounts

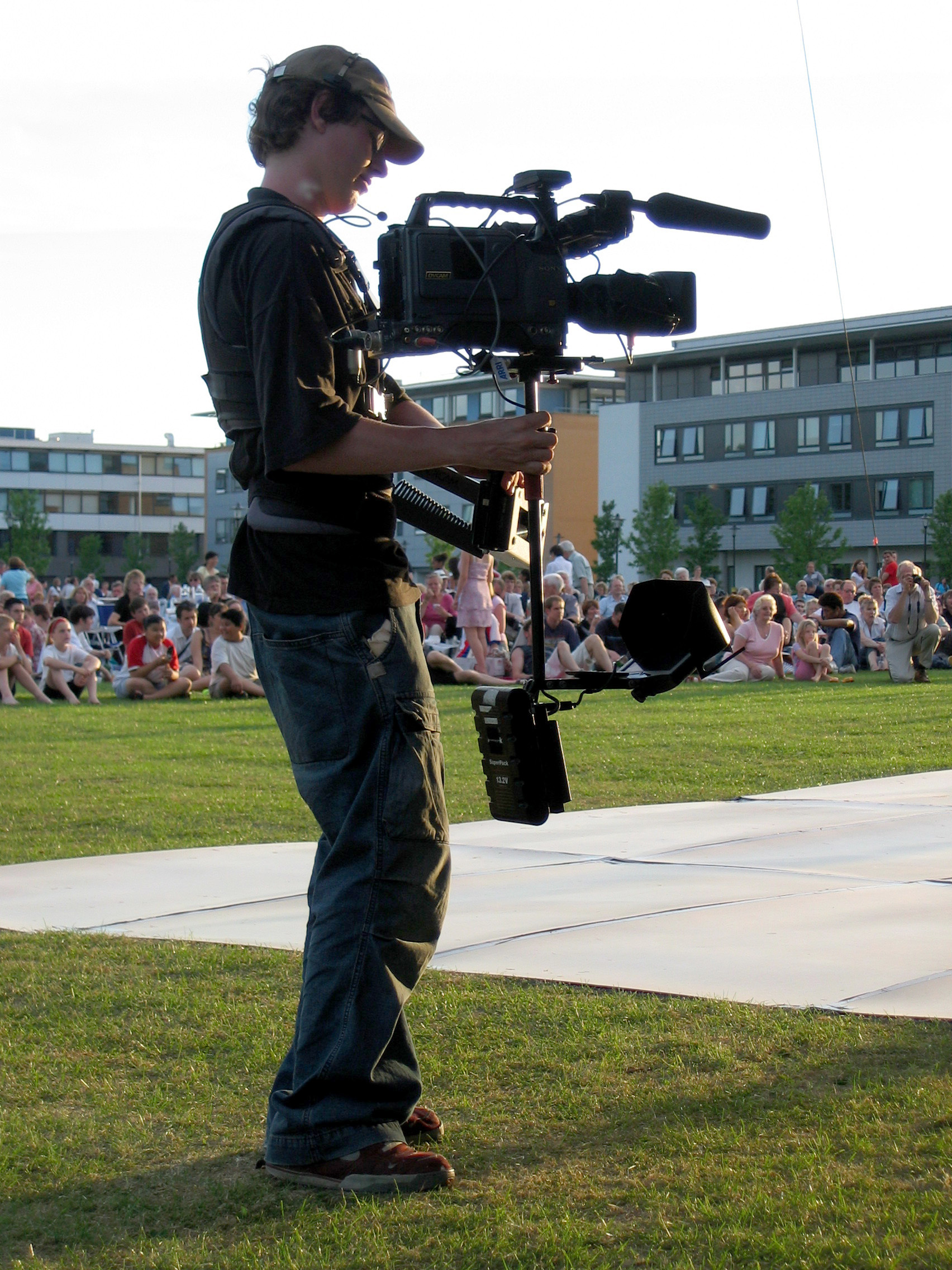
- A camera operator using the Steadicam in front of an audience
- Product type: Camera stabilizer
- Current owner: Tiffen
- Country: United States
- Introduced: 1975; 51 years ago

Steadicam is a brand of camera stabilizer mounts for motion picture cameras invented by Garrett Brown and introduced in 1975 by Cinema Products Corporation. The Steadicam brand was acquired by Tiffen in 2000. It was designed to isolate the camera from the camera operator's movement, keeping the camera motion separate and controllable by a skilled operator.

== History ==
Before the camera stabilizing system, a director had a number of choices for moving (or "tracking") shots:

1. The camera could be mounted on a dolly, a wheeled mount that rolls on specialized tracks or a smooth surface.
2. The camera could be mounted on a crane, a counterweighted arm that could move the camera vertically and horizontally.
3. The camera operator shot hand-held which would produce footage suitable mostly for reportage used in documentaries, news, or live action, for unrehearsed or practice footage, or for the evocation of authentic immediacy— e.g., cinéma vérité style— during dramatic sequences.

While these cinematic techniques are still common, smooth and steady tracking shots with lighter weight camera systems was enabled with the creation of the Steadicam in 1975 by inventor and cameraman Garrett Brown. After completing the first working prototype, which was called the "Brown Stabilizer", Brown created a ten-minute demo reel of the new cinematography techniques enabled by the Steadicam and which was shown to numerous directors, including Stanley Kubrick and John G. Avildsen. The first demo reel featuring use of The Steadicam was shot in 1974. The 1974 video was filmed by Brown himself, and featured several shots of Brown's then-girlfriend and future wife, Ellen Shire, on notable local landmarks; such as at Yellow Springs and on the steps of the Philadelphia Museum of Art. The final design was completed in 1975. The Steadicam was subsequently licensed to and manufactured by Cinema Products Corporation, which later diversified the brand into a consumer line of Steadicams for light weight DV cameras.

External videos
- First use of Steadicam
- Bound For Glory Steadicam Shot

The Steadicam was first used in the Best Picture–nominated Woody Guthrie biopic Bound for Glory (1976). Cinematographer Haskell Wexler had Brown begin a shot on a fully elevated platform crane which jibbed down, and when it reached the ground, Brown stepped off and walked the camera through the set.

Steadicams were then used extensively for chase scenes on the streets of New York City in Marathon Man (1976), which was released two months before Bound for Glory. The Steadicam's third picture was Avildsen's Best Picture–winning Rocky in 1976, where it was an integral part of the film's Philadelphia street jogging/training sequences and the run up the Art Museum's flight of stairs. In many fight scenes a Steadicam was visible ringside, as well as during some wide shots of the final fight. Rocky was also released before Bound for Glory. Garrett Brown was the Steadicam operator on all three films.

The Shining (1980) prompted further Steadicam innovation when director Stanley Kubrick requested that the camera shoot from barely above the floor. This necessitated the invention of "low mode", in which the top of the camera is mounted to the bottom of an inverted post, which substantially increased the creative angles of the system which previously could not go much lower than the operator's waist height.

A Steadicam rig was also employed during the filming of Return of the Jedi (1983), in conjunction with two gyroscopes for extra stabilization, to film the background plates for the speeder bike chase. Brown walked through a redwood forest, with the camera running at a speed of less than one frame per second. The result, when projected at 24 frames per second, gave the impression of flying through the air at perilous speeds. In the Michael Crichton film Runaway (1984), a Steadicam rig was used to simulate the point of view of a futuristic smart bullet in flight while targeting specific individuals by their heat signature.

== Description ==
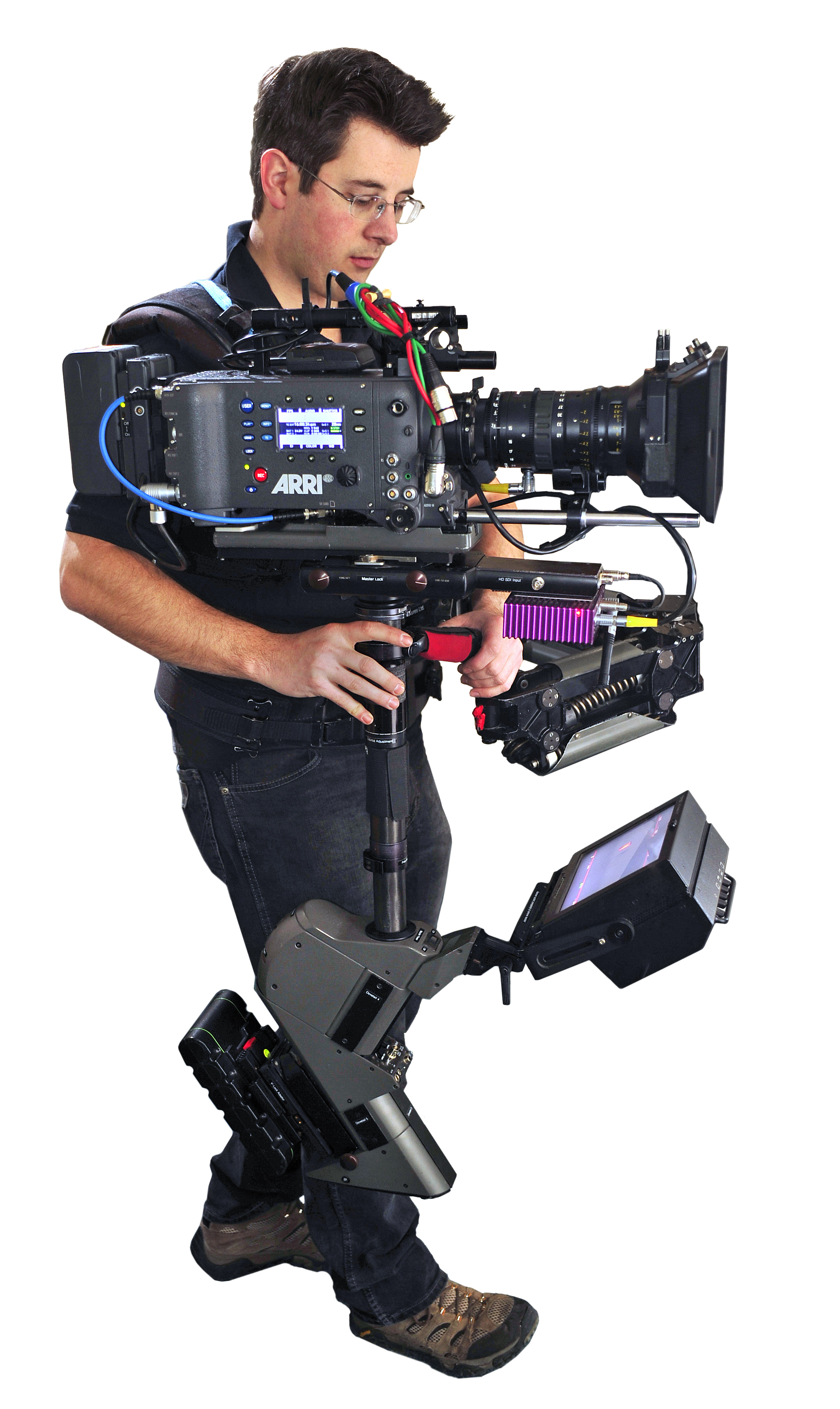
The larger Steadicams are designed to support 35mm film cameras, digital cinema cameras, and IMAX cameras.

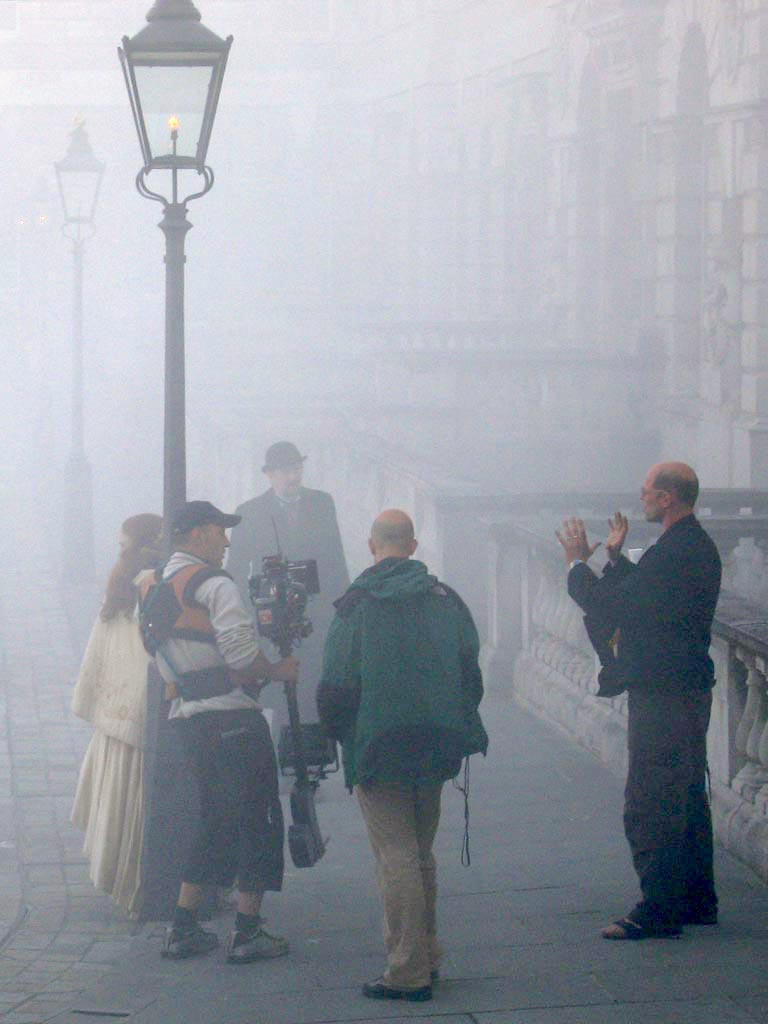
To film this recreated Victorian London street scene, the Steadicam operator is next to the lamp post, wearing a leather Steadicam vest.

The operator wears a harness, the Steadicam vest, which is attached to an iso-elastic arm. This is connected by a multi-axis and ultra-low friction gimbal to the Steadicam "sled" which has the camera mounted at one end and counterbalancing weight (the monitor and batteries) at the other. The monitor substitutes for the camera's viewfinder, since the range of motion of the camera relative to the operator makes the camera's own viewfinder unusable. The Steadicam stays upright by simply making the bottom slightly heavier than the top, pivoting at the gimbal. This leaves the center of gravity of the whole rig, however heavy it may be, within control of the operator through the gimbal. The skill of the operator is to keep the desired framing and composition by feathering the touch on the gimbal, while the rig and operator is in motion or still.

The combined weight of the counterbalance and camera means that the armature bears a relatively high inertia mass which is not easily moved by small body movements from the operator. The freely pivoting armature adds additional stabilization to the photographed image, and makes the weight of the camera-sled assembly acceptable by allowing the body harness to support it.

When the armature is correctly balanced, operators can remove their hands from the Steadicam entirely and the camera stays in place. During operation, the Steadicam operator usually rests a hand on the camera gimbal and applies force at that point to move the camera. To avoid shaking the camera when lens adjustments are made, a wireless remote operated by the camera assistant is used to control focus and iris.

For low-angle shots, the Steadicam sled can be inverted vertically, putting the camera on the bottom, and the monitor and batteries on the top. This is referred to as low mode operation.

The newest generation is the Tango. A body-supported camera-stabilization-system, its horizontal mechanism makes it possible to move the camera freely while staying horizontal. A Steadicam operator can change from low mode to high mode without any alteration. Dimensions are not limited to ups and downs, but also in depth and over or through obstacles.

The smallest, lightest Steadicam that can be used with a support arm and vest is the Merlin. Photographers who shoot with HDSLR cameras that combine still and motion photography most often work with the Merlin. Since the Merlin has no facility to carry a separate monitor, cameras suitable for it must have built-in monitors.

Steadicam introduced a camera mount for smartphones, called the Smoothee, in 2012. Marketed to consumers instead of video professionals, its tubular frame supports iPhone and Android phones that are 4.53" to 6.26" long by 2.32" to 3.27" wide (115 to 159 mm long by 59 to 83 mm wide). An adapter can be used to fit a GoPro camera to it.

== Awards and recognition ==
- Academy Award
  - 1978 – Academy Award of Merit – Awarded to Garrett Brown (the Cinema Products Corporation; engineering staff under the supervision of John Jurgens) for the invention and development of Steadicam.
- American Society of Cinematographers
  - 2001 – President's Award, awarded to Garrett Brown
- Society of Camera Operators
  - 1992 – Technical Achievement Award, awarded to Garrett Brown (and Cinema Products Corporation) for the Steadicam camera stabilizing system.
  - 2008 – Technical Achievement Award, awarded to Garrett Brown and Jerry Holway (inventor) and Tiffen (developer) for the Ultra2 Steadicam camera support system.
- Steadicam Guild Life Achievement Award
  - 2012 – The Steadicam Guild's Life Achievement Award, awarded to Garrett Brown (inventor and Steadicam operator) for his invention of the Steadicam and his Steadicam work on nearly 100 major motion pictures.
- Nikola Tesla Satellite Award
  - 2014 – Awarded to Garrett Brown for visionary achievement in filmmaking technology

== See also ==
- 1976 in film
- Carl Akeley, invented gyroscope-mounted "pancake" camera
- Image stabilization
- List of generic and genericized trademarks
- MK-V AR
- Panaglide
- Skycam
- SnorriCam
- Spidercam
- Vestibulo-ocular reflex

== Bibliography ==
- Jerry Holway et Laurie Hayball, The Steadicam© Operator's Handbook, éditions Focal Press
- Serena Ferrara, Steadicam, Techniques and Aesthetics, éditions Focal Press
- Ballerini David, Una rivoluzione nel modo di fare di cinema, Falsopiano, 2012
- « Le Steadicam a-t-il une âme ? » [dossier], Vertigo, n°24, 2003, p. 46-84
- Monassa Tatiana, « Le Tyler Mount et le Steadicam : inventer la stabilisation de la caméra pour libérer le cadre cinématographique », Création Collective au Cinéma, n°02/2019. p. 125-148.
- Andrzej Dambski, « Le steadicam : d’un usage classique à une recherche de déséquilibre et de vitesse », mémoire de master, dir. Tony Gauthier, ENS Louis Lumière, 2015
- Théo Michel, « Le mouvement-steadicam et la performance du corps : usages, expressions, perceptions », mémoire de master, dir. Antoine Gaudin, Paris 3 Sorbonne-Nouvelle, 2021
