= MK-V AR =

Camera stabilisation system

The MK-V AR or Auto-Leveling Revolution is a body supported camera stabilization system designed and engineered by Howard J Smith of MK-V. The core of the advancement of the Steadicam is the circular ring mechanism which makes it possible to move the camera freely on the optical axis, allowing the image to stay level. A Steadicam operator can change from low to high mode without any alteration. The system allow the Steadicam operator to achieve shots similar to a jib crane with long vertical moves, while keeping the freedom of mobility of a Steadicam system.

The system combines three techniques:

- The rig is based on Steadicam and operated by the same operators. The operator can walk, run, climb and can load all cameras which are suitable for a Steadicam.
- The operator can make lifts from the ground up to 2.5 meters in one take, fly the camera over obstacles and through car windows, and film with a major offset to the walking route.
- The operator can use a Segway handsfree transporter to move faster up to 20 km/h (12.5 mph)

MK-V announced in June an upgrade to the AR system called the Ωmega Fusion

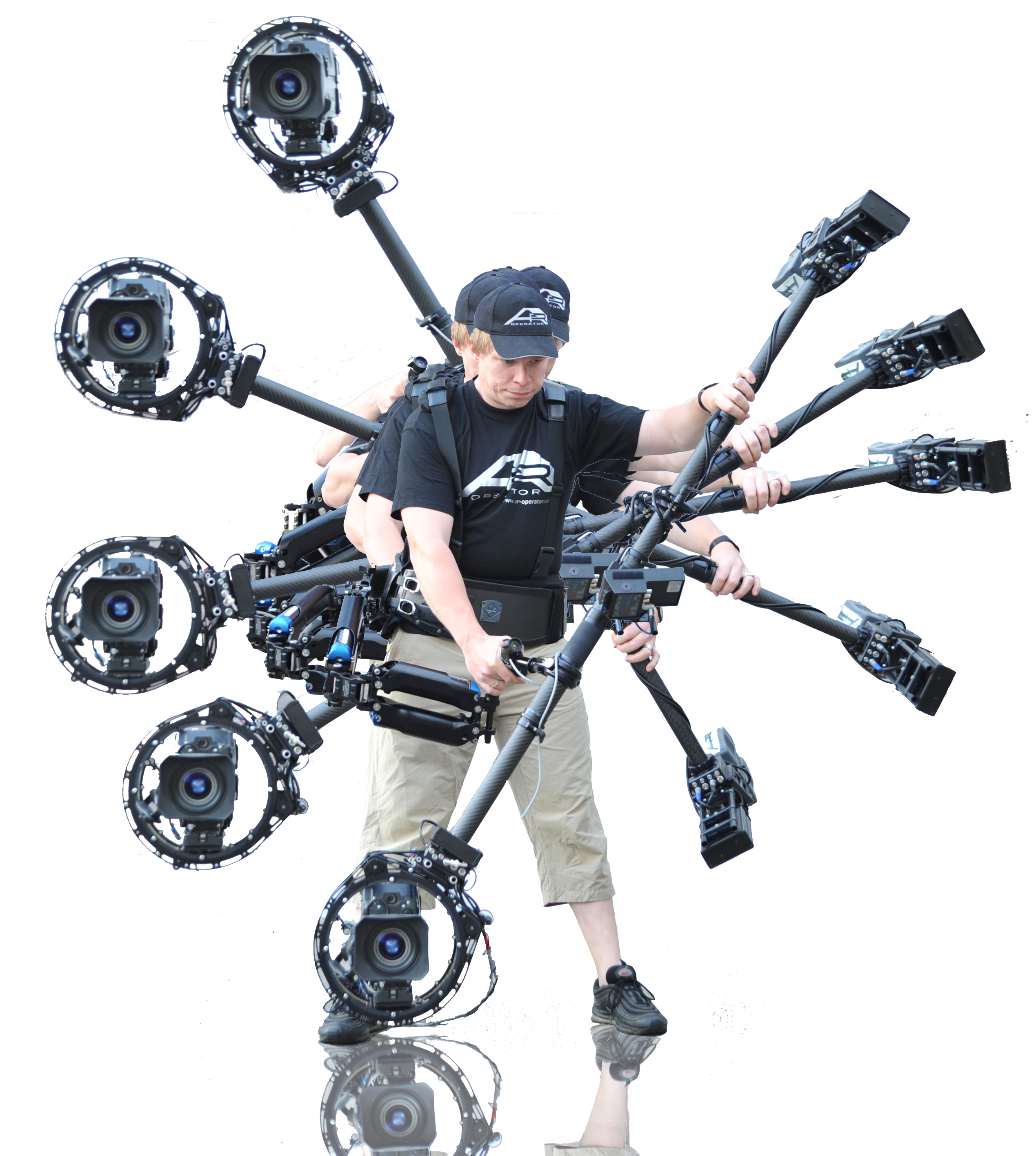
AR Move

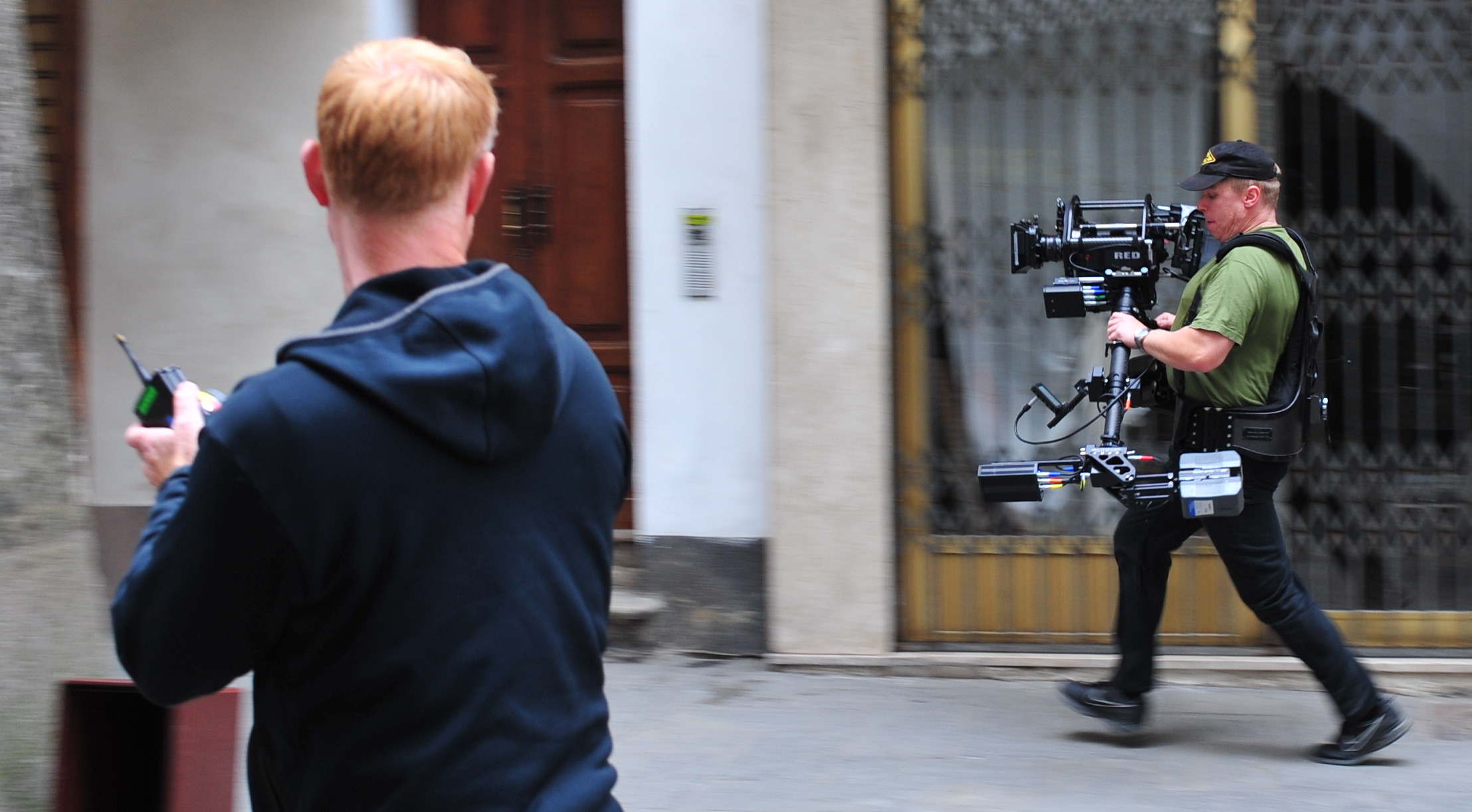
AR bodymounted

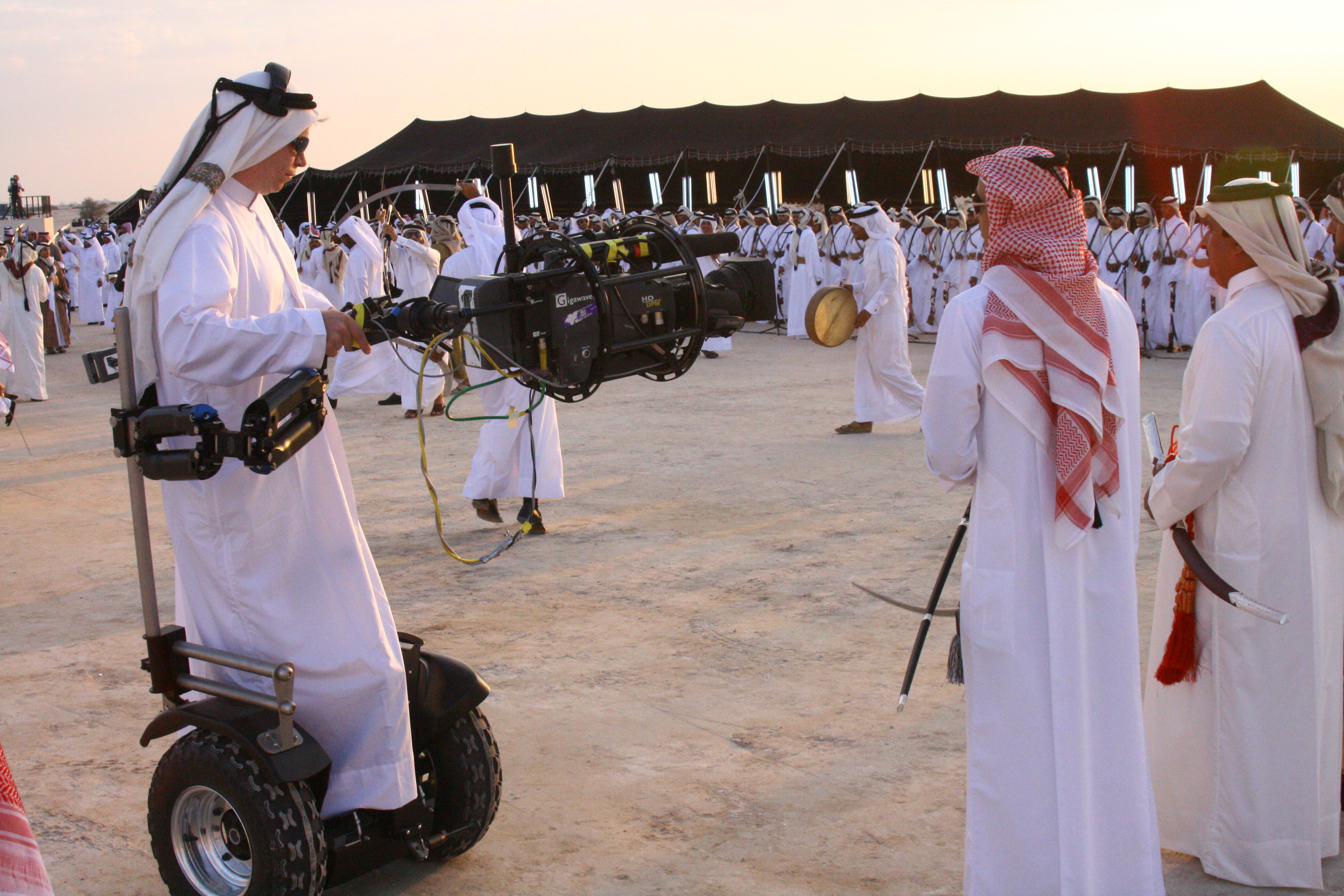
AR with handsfree transporter
