= Panaglide =

Motion picture camera stabilizer brand

- Product type: Camera stabilizer
- Current owner: Panavision
- Country: United States

Panaglide is a brand of camera stabilizer mounts for motion picture cameras made by Panavision.

The Panaglide steadies the camera operator's movement, allowing for a smooth shot.

The Panaglide was used in such films as Halloween and Terrence Malick's Days of Heaven, which was the first film to use the Panaglide.

== See also ==
- Steadicam
