= Indiana Jones =

American film franchise

- Official franchise logo
- Created by: George Lucas
- Original work: Raiders of the Lost Ark
- Owner: Lucasfilm
- Years: 1981–present

Print publications
- Comics: Indiana Jones (1981–2010)

Films and television
- Films: Raiders of the Lost Ark (1981); The Temple of Doom (1984); The Last Crusade (1989); The Kingdom of the Crystal Skull (2008); The Dial of Destiny (2023)
- Television series: The Young Indiana Jones Chronicles (1992–1993)

Audio
- Soundtracks: Raiders of the Lost Ark; Indiana Jones and the Temple of Doom; Indiana Jones and the Last Crusade; Indiana Jones and the Kingdom of the Crystal Skull; Indiana Jones and the Dial of Destiny

Miscellaneous
- Theme park attractions: Indiana Jones Adventure; Indiana Jones and the Temple of the Peril; Indiana Jones Epic Stunt Spectacular!
- Pinball: Indiana Jones: The Pinball Adventure (1993)

Indiana Jones is an American media franchise owned by Lucasfilm consisting of five films and a prequel television series, along with games, comics, and tie-in novels. The franchise centers on the adventures of Dr. Henry Walton "Indiana" Jones, Jr., a fictional professor of archaeology. Jones is portrayed by Harrison Ford in all five of the films.

The film series was created by George Lucas and began in 1981 with Raiders of the Lost Ark, which was followed in 1984 by a prequel, Indiana Jones and the Temple of Doom. A sequel, Indiana Jones and the Last Crusade, was released in 1989, followed by Indiana Jones and the Kingdom of the Crystal Skull in 2008. A fifth film, Indiana Jones and the Dial of Destiny, was released in 2023. The first four films were directed by Steven Spielberg, who worked closely with Lucas during their production. The fifth film was directed by James Mangold. In 1992, the franchise expanded to a television series with The Young Indiana Jones Chronicles, depicting Jones in his youth.

Marvel Comics began publishing the comic series The Further Adventures of Indiana Jones in 1983. Dark Horse Comics gained the comic book rights to the character in 1991. In addition to novelizations of the films, many novels with original stories have been published, including a series of German-language novels by Wolfgang Hohlbein; twelve novels published by Bantam Books which are set before the films; and a series of books set during Jones's childhood, which were inspired by the television series. Numerous Indiana Jones video games have been released since 1982.

== Background ==
In 1973 George Lucas wrote The Adventures of Indiana Smith. Like Star Wars, it was an opportunity to create a modern version of the movie serials of the 1930s and 1940s. Lucas discussed the concept with Philip Kaufman, who worked with him for several weeks and decided upon the Ark of the Covenant as the MacGuffin. The project was stalled when Clint Eastwood hired Kaufman to write The Outlaw Josey Wales. In May 1977, Lucas was in Maui, trying to escape the worldwide success of Star Wars. His friend and colleague Steven Spielberg was also there, on vacation from work on Close Encounters of the Third Kind. Spielberg told Lucas he was interested in making a James Bond film, but Lucas pitched him an idea he claimed was "better than James Bond", outlining the plot of Raiders of the Lost Ark. Spielberg loved it, calling it "a James Bond film without the hardware", but didn't like the surname "Smith". Lucas then suggested "Indiana Jones", to which Spielberg agreed. Spielberg and Lucas made a deal with Paramount Pictures for five Indiana Jones films.

Spielberg and Lucas aimed to make Indiana Jones and the Temple of Doom much darker, because of their personal moods following their respective breakups and divorces. Lucas made the film a prequel because he did not want the Nazis to be the villains again. He had ideas regarding the Monkey King and a haunted castle, but eventually created the Sankara Stones, that would be used in the film. He hired Willard Huyck and Gloria Katz to write the script; he knew of their interest in Indian culture. The major scenes that were dropped from Raiders of the Lost Ark were included in this film: an escape using a giant rolling gong as a shield, a fall out of a plane in a raft, and a mine cart chase. For the third film, Spielberg revisited the Monkey King and haunted castle concepts, before Lucas suggested the Holy Grail. Spielberg had previously rejected this as too ethereal, but then devised a father-son story and decided that "The Grail that everybody seeks could be a metaphor for a son seeking reconciliation with a father and a father seeking reconciliation with a son."

Following the 1989 release of Indiana Jones and the Last Crusade, Lucas let the series end as he felt he could not think of a good plot device to drive the next installment and chose instead to produce The Young Indiana Jones Chronicles, which explored the character in his early years. Ford played Indiana in one episode, narrating his adventures in 1920 Chicago. When Lucas shot Ford's role in December 1992, he realized that the scene opened up the possibility of a film with an older Indiana set in the 1950s. The film could reflect a science fiction 1950s B-movie, with aliens as the plot device. Ford disliked the new angle, telling Lucas: "No way am I being in a Steven Spielberg movie like that." Spielberg himself, who depicted aliens in Close Encounters of the Third Kind and E.T. the Extra-Terrestrial, resisted it. Lucas devised a story, which Jeb Stuart turned into a script from October 1993 to May 1994. Lucas wanted Indiana to get married, which would allow Henry Jones Sr. to return, expressing concern over whether his son is happy with what he has accomplished. After learning that Joseph Stalin was interested in psychic warfare, Lucas decided to have Russians as the villains and the aliens to have psychic powers. Following Stuart's next draft, Lucas hired Last Crusade writer Jeffrey Boam to write the next three versions, the last of which was completed in March 1996. Three months later, Independence Day was released, and Spielberg told Lucas he would not make another alien invasion film (or at least not until War of the Worlds in 2005). Lucas decided to focus on the Star Wars prequels instead.

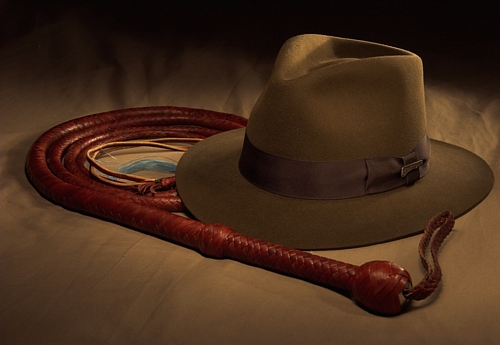
The iconic bullwhip and hat used by Indiana Jones are important parts of the character development throughout the series.

In 2000, Spielberg's son asked when the next Indiana Jones film would be released, which made him interested in reviving the project. The same year, Ford, Lucas, Spielberg, Frank Marshall, and Kathleen Kennedy met during the American Film Institute's tribute to Ford, and decided they wanted to enjoy the experience of making an Indiana Jones film again. Spielberg also found returning to the series a respite from his many dark films during this period. Spielberg and Lucas discussed the central idea of a B-movie involving aliens, and Lucas suggested using crystal skulls to ground the idea. Lucas found these artifacts as fascinating as the Ark, and had intended to feature them for a Young Indiana Jones episode before the show's cancellation. M. Night Shyamalan was hired to write for an intended 2002 shoot, but he was overwhelmed by the task, and claimed it was difficult to get Ford, Spielberg, and Lucas to focus. Stephen Gaghan and Tom Stoppard were also approached.

Frank Darabont, who wrote various Young Indiana Jones episodes, was hired to write in May 2002. His script, titled Indiana Jones and the City of Gods, was set in the 1950s, with ex-Nazis pursuing Jones. Spielberg conceived the idea because of real-life figures such as Juan Perón in Argentina, who allegedly protected Nazi war criminals. Darabont claimed Spielberg loved the script, but Lucas had issues with it, and decided to take over writing himself. Lucas and Spielberg acknowledged that the 1950s setting could not ignore the Cold War, and the Russians were more plausible villains. Spielberg decided he could not satirize the Nazis after directing Schindler's List, while Ford felt "We plum[b] wore the Nazis out." Darabont's main contribution was reintroducing Marion Ravenwood as Indiana's love interest, but he gave them a 13-year-old daughter, which Spielberg decided was too similar to The Lost World: Jurassic Park.

Jeff Nathanson met with Spielberg and Lucas in August 2004, and turned in the next drafts in October and November 2005, titled The Atomic Ants. David Koepp continued on from there, giving his script the subtitle Destroyer of Worlds, based on the J. Robert Oppenheimer quote. It was changed to Kingdom of the Crystal Skull, as Spielberg found this a more inviting title which actually named the plot device. Koepp wanted to depict the character of Mutt as a nerd, but Lucas refused, explaining he had to resemble Marlon Brando in The Wild One; "he needs to be what Indiana Jones's father thought of [him] – the curse returns in the form of his own son – he's everything a father can't stand". Koepp collaborated with Lawrence Kasdan on the film's "love dialogue".

Development of the fifth film began in 2008, but the project stalled for years. In 2012, The Walt Disney Company acquired Lucasfilm, the series' production company, thereby becoming the owner of the Indiana Jones intellectual property. The following year, Walt Disney Studios acquired the distribution and marketing rights to future Indiana Jones films, with Paramount retaining the distribution rights to the first four films and receiving "financial participation" from any additional films. (Note: Attributed to multiple references:) Development on the film continued, and it eventually became Indiana Jones and the Dial of Destiny. The film was directed by James Mangold, who co-wrote the script with Jez and John-Henry Butterworth. Spielberg was initially set to direct the film, before passing it to Mangold. Spielberg instead served as an executive producer with Lucas, along with producers Kennedy and Marshall. Ford reprised the title role, along with Karen Allen and John Rhys-Davies and new cast members included Phoebe Waller-Bridge, Mads Mikkelsen, Thomas Kretschmann, Boyd Holbrook, Shaunette Renée Wilson, Toby Jones and Antonio Banderas. The film was co-produced by Lucasfilm and Walt Disney Pictures, marking the first film in the series with Disney's involvement. Filming eventually began in the United Kingdom in June 2021 and wrapped in February 2022. Indiana Jones and the Dial of Destiny was released by Disney on June 30, 2023. It was the final film in the franchise.

== Films ==
Indiana Jones films
| Film | U.S. release date | Directed by | Screenplay by | Story by | Produced by | Year of setting | Distributed by |
|---|---|---|---|---|---|---|---|
| Raiders of the Lost Ark | June 12, 1981 | Steven Spielberg | Lawrence Kasdan | George Lucas and Philip Kaufman | Frank Marshall | 1936 | Paramount Pictures |
| Indiana Jones and the Temple of Doom | May 23, 1984 | Steven Spielberg | Gloria Katz & Willard Huyck | George Lucas | Robert Watts | 1935 | Paramount Pictures |
| Indiana Jones and the Last Crusade | May 24, 1989 | Steven Spielberg | Jeffrey Boam | Menno Meyjes and George Lucas | Robert Watts | 1912/1938 | Paramount Pictures |
| Indiana Jones and the Kingdom of the Crystal Skull | May 22, 2008 | Steven Spielberg | David Koepp | George Lucas and Jeff Nathanson | Frank Marshall | 1957 | Paramount Pictures |
| Indiana Jones and the Dial of Destiny | June 30, 2023 | James Mangold | Jez Butterworth & John-Henry Butterworth and James Mangold and David Koepp | | Simon Emanuel, Frank Marshall & Kathleen Kennedy | 1944/1969 | Walt Disney Studios Motion Pictures |

=== Raiders of the Lost Ark (1981) ===
The first film is set in 1936, one year after The Temple of Doom. Indiana Jones (Harrison Ford) is hired by government agents to locate the Ark of the Covenant, the gold plated chest containing the stone tablets Moses used to inscribe the Ten Commandments before the Nazi Germans steal it for themselves. The Nazis have teams searching for religious artifacts, including the Ark, which is rumored to make an army that carries the Ark before it invincible. The Nazis are being helped by Indiana's arch-rival and French archaeologist René Belloq (Paul Freeman). With the help of his former lover and tough bar owner Marion Ravenwood (Karen Allen) and his excavator friend Sallah (John Rhys-Davies), Indiana manages to recover the Ark in Egypt. The Nazis steal the Ark and capture Indiana and Marion. Belloq and the Nazis perform a ceremony to open the Ark, but when they do so, all they find inside is sand. Suddenly, spirits come out of the Ark and the Nazis are all killed by the Ark's wrath. Indiana and Marion, who survived by closing their eyes, manage to get the Ark to the United States, where it is stored in a secret government warehouse.

=== Indiana Jones and the Temple of Doom (1984) ===
The second film is set in 1935, one year before Raiders of the Lost Ark. Indiana escapes Chinese gangsters led by Lao Che with the help of singer/actress Willie Scott (Kate Capshaw) and his twelve-year-old sidekick Short Round (Ke Huy Quan). The trio crash-land in India, where they come across a Punjabi village whose children have been kidnapped. The Thuggee cult led by Mola Ram (Amrish Puri) has also taken the holy Sankara Stones, which they will use to take over the world. Indiana manages to overcome Mola Ram's evil power, rescues the children and returns the stones to their rightful place, overcoming his own mercenary nature. The film has been noted as an outlier in the franchise, as it does not feature Jones's university or any antagonistic political entity, and is less focused on archaeology, being presented as a dark movie with gross-out elements, human sacrifice and torture.

=== Indiana Jones and the Last Crusade (1989) ===
The third film is set in 1938, two years after Raiders of the Lost Ark. Indiana and his friend Marcus Brody (Denholm Elliott) are assigned by American businessman Walter Donovan (Julian Glover) to find the Holy Grail. They are teamed up with Dr. Elsa Schneider (Alison Doody), following on from where Indiana's estranged father Henry (Sean Connery) left off before he disappeared. It transpires that Donovan and Elsa are in league with the Nazis, who captured Henry Jones to get Indiana to help them find the Grail. However, Indiana recovers his father's diary filled with his research, and manages to rescue him before finding the location of the Grail. Both Donovan and Elsa fall to the temptation of the Grail, while Indiana and Henry realize that their relationship with each other is more important than finding the relic.

=== Indiana Jones and the Kingdom of the Crystal Skull (2008) ===
The fourth film is set in 1957, nineteen years after The Last Crusade. Indiana is having a quiet life teaching before being thrust into a new adventure. He races against agents of the Soviet Union, led by Irina Spalko (Cate Blanchett) for a crystal skull. His journey takes him across Nevada, Connecticut, Peru, and the Amazon rainforest in Brazil. Faced with betrayal by one of his best friends, Mac (Ray Winstone), Indiana is introduced to a greaser named Mutt Williams (Shia LaBeouf), who turns out to be his son (his real name revealed to be Henry Jones III), and is reunited with, and eventually marries, Marion Ravenwood, who was the lead female character introduced in the first movie.

=== Indiana Jones and the Dial of Destiny (2023) ===
The fifth and final film is set in 1969, twelve years after The Kingdom of the Crystal Skull. Indiana has moved to New York City, teaching at Hunter College with plans to retire, after his marriage with Marion collapsed following Mutt's death in the Vietnam War. Once his estranged goddaughter Helena Shaw (Phoebe Waller-Bridge) arrives asking for Archimedes' Dial, a relic Jones and her father Basil (Toby Jones) retrieved from the Nazis in 1944 during the Allied liberation of Europe in World War II. A Nazi-turned-NASA scientist Jürgen Voller (Mads Mikkelsen) starts pursuing Jones, wanting to exploit the Dial's unusual properties to change the outcome of World War II. Indiana's journey takes him to Morocco, Greece, and Italy, where he inadvertently ends up traveling back in time to the 212 BC Siege of Syracuse after Voller uses the Dial to locate a time fissure in hopes of assassinating Adolf Hitler prior to the Invasion of Poland to usurp him and lead the Nazis to victory. Upon returning to New York in the present time, Indiana reconciles with Marion.

Countries visited on-screen throughout the events of the films Visited in Raiders of the Lost Ark Visited in Temple of Doom Visited in Last Crusade Visited in Kingdom of the Crystal Skull Visited in Dial of Destiny

== Television ==
=== The Young Indiana Jones Chronicles ===
| Season | Episodes | Originally released | | |
| Season | Episodes | First released | Last released | Network |
|---|---|---|---|---|
| 1 | 6 | March 4, 1992 | April 8, 1992 | ABC |
| 2 | 22 | September 21, 1992 | July 24, 1993 | ABC |
| TV films | 4 | October 15, 1994 | June 16, 1996 | The Family Channel |

A television series titled The Young Indiana Jones Chronicles (1992–1996) featured three incarnations of the character: Sean Patrick Flanery played Indiana aged 16–21; Corey Carrier played an 8- to 10-year-old version in several episodes; and George Hall narrated the show as the 93-year-old Jones, who bookended each episode. Lucas began developing the series in 1990 as "edutainment" that would be more cerebral than the films. The show was his first collaboration with producer Rick McCallum, and he wrote the stories for each episode. Writers and directors on the show included Carrie Fisher, Frank Darabont, Vic Armstrong, Ben Burtt, Terry Jones, Nicolas Roeg, Mike Newell and Joe Johnston. In the Chronicles, Jones crosses paths with many historical figures, played by stars such as Daniel Craig, Christopher Lee, Bob Peck, Jeffrey Wright, Marc Warren, Catherine Zeta-Jones, Elizabeth Hurley, Anne Heche, Vanessa Redgrave, Julian Fellowes, Timothy Spall and Harrison Ford as a 50-year-old Indiana in one episode (taking the usual place of Hall).

The show was filmed in over 25 countries for over 150 weeks. Season one was shot from March 1991 to March 1992; the second season began two months later and wrapped in April 1993. The ABC network was unsure of Lucas's cerebral approach, and attempted to advertise the series as an action-adventure like the films. Ratings were good if unspectacular, and ABC was nervous enough to put the show on hiatus after six episodes until September 1992. With only four episodes left of the second season to air, ABC eventually sold the show to the Family Channel, who changed the format from 50-minute episodes to 90-minute TV movies. Filming for the final four episodes took place from January 1994 to May 1996. The Young Indiana Jones Chronicles received a mixed reception from fans, although it won 10 Emmy Awards out of 23 nominations, as well as a 1994 Golden Globe nomination for Best Drama series. It was also an experimentation ground in digital effects for Lucasfilm.

The original broadcast versions of some episodes were briefly released in Japan on laserdisc in 1993 and on VHS in 1994. However, Lucas re-edited and restructured the show for its worldwide home video release. Major structural changes were made, including the complete removal of the 'bookend' sections narrated by the 93-year-old Jones. The editing combined episodes together into creating roughly an hour and a half movies to streamline the series into a more consistent structure. Approximately half of the series was released on VHS in various markets around the world in 1999, but the entire series was not released until its DVD debut, in a series of three boxsets released from 2007 to 2008, to tie in with the theatrical debut of Kingdom of the Crystal Skull. Among other extras, the DVDs include approximately 100 new historical featurettes.

=== Proposed Disney+ series ===
In November 2022, it was reported that Lucasfilm was developing an Indiana Jones series for Disney+. The series was set to be a prequel to Raiders of the Lost Ark and would have been the second prequel series following The Young Indiana Jones Chronicles. However, by March 2023, Lucasfilm was reported to have canceled the planned prequel series to focus on the Star Wars franchise, this being similarly cited as the reason behind the cancellation of the fellow non-Star Wars Lucasfilm show Willow. On May 11, Lucasfilm president Kathleen Kennedy expressed interest in continuing the Indiana Jones franchise through a television series centering on characters aside from Jones, due to Harrison Ford retiring from the role after Dial of Destiny.

== Video games ==
Since the release of the original film, there have been a number of video games based on the Indiana Jones series. These include both games based on (or derived from) the films, as well as those featuring the characters in new storylines.

=== Games adapted or derived from the films ===
- Raiders of the Lost Ark (1982, Atari Inc) – The first Indiana Jones video game. Released on the Atari 2600.
- Indiana Jones and the Temple of Doom (1985, Atari Games) – Arcade game, later converted to many home computer and console formats, including an NES version in 1988.
- Indiana Jones and the Last Crusade: The Action Game (1989, LucasArts) – One of two Last Crusade-based games released by LucasArts in 1989.
- Indiana Jones and the Last Crusade: The Graphic Adventure (1989, LucasArts)
- Indiana Jones and the Last Crusade (1991, Taito) – Released for the NES console.
- Indiana Jones and the Last Crusade (1993, Ubisoft) – Released for the NES console.
- Indiana Jones' Greatest Adventures (1994, JVC/LucasArts) – The final film adaptation until 2008, based upon all three original films. Released on the Super Nintendo Entertainment System.
- Indiana Jones (2008, LeapFrog Enterprises) - An adaptation of Kingdom of the Crystal Skull for the Didj Custom Gaming System.
- Lego Indiana Jones: The Original Adventures (2008, LucasArts) – Based on the original three movies and the Lego toy franchise.
- Lego Indiana Jones 2: The Adventure Continues (2009, LucasArts) – A sequel to the original Lego Indiana Jones game featuring new levels based on the first three films as well as Kingdom of the Crystal Skull.

=== Original games ===
- Indiana Jones in the Lost Kingdom (1985, Mindscape)
- Indiana Jones in Revenge of the Ancients (1987, Mindscape) – Released for the Apple II and PC DOS computer platforms.
- Indiana Jones and the Fate of Atlantis (1992, LucasArts) – Released for DOS (IBM PC) compatibles in 1992.
- The Young Indiana Jones Chronicles (1993, Jaleco) – Released for the NES console.
- Instruments of Chaos starring Young Indiana Jones (1994, Sega) – Released for the Sega Genesis
- Indiana Jones and His Desktop Adventures (1996, LucasArts)
- Indiana Jones and the Infernal Machine (1999, LucasArts) – Released in 1999 on the PC, as well as for the Nintendo 64
  - Indiana Jones and the Infernal Machine (2D version) (2001, LucasArts) – A 2D version of Infernal Machine released for the Game Boy Color
- Indiana Jones and the Emperor's Tomb (2003, LucasArts) – a prequel to Temple of Doom. Released on the PlayStation 2, Xbox and Microsoft Windows in 2003.
- Indiana Jones and the Staff of Kings (2009, LucasArts) – Released in June 2009 for the Nintendo DS, Wii, PSP and PS2.
- Indiana Jones and the Lost Puzzles (2009, THQ) – Developed by Universomo and published by THQ Wireless for BlackBerry, iOS, and Windows Mobile.
- Indiana Jones Adventure World (2011, Zynga) – The social gaming company Zynga partnered with Lucasfilm to produce this game late 2011.
- Indiana Jones and the Great Circle (2024, Bethesda Softworks, MachineGames, Lucasfilm Games) – an action-adventure game with an original narrative developed by MachineGames and executive produced by Todd Howard from Bethesda Game Studios, was announced in January 2021. It was released on Windows, Xbox Series X/S on December 9, 2024, and on PlayStation 5 on April 17, 2025. A Nintendo Switch 2 version was released on May 12, 2026.

=== Cancelled games ===
- Indiana Jones and the Iron Phoenix – An intended sequel to The Fate of Atlantis, intended for a 1995 release, but was canceled.
- Core Design developed a game around 2006 as a reskin of a cancelled Tomb Raider game, but this incarnation was not successful either.
- Lego Tomb Raider crossover - A Lego themed crossover with the Tomb Raider franchise pitched in the mid 2000s. Lucasfilm rejected the idea due to disdain for the Tomb Raider series.

=== Other ===
- Indiana Jones appears in LEGO Star Wars: The Complete Saga (2007) as a hidden character and teaser for the then upcoming LEGO Indiana Jones Game. He is unlocked by going to the "Bonus" area in the Mos Eisley Cantina, entering the "Trailers" door, and watching the trailer for LEGO Indiana Jones. Afterwards, you can buy him from the shop for 50,000 studs.
- Indiana Jones appears in Fortnite: Battle Royale (2017, Epic Games) as part of the Chapter 3 – Season 3 Battle pass.
- The world-building video game Disney Magic Kingdoms includes some characters from the Indiana Jones films as playable characters, in addition to attractions based on the franchise.

== Cast and crew ==
=== Cast ===
List indicators

This section includes characters who will appear or have appeared in the Indiana Jones film franchise.

- An empty grey cell indicates the character was not in the film, or that the character's official presence has not yet been confirmed.
- ^{C} indicates a cameo role.
- ^{P} indicates an appearance in onscreen photographs.
- ^{Y} indicates a younger version of the character.

| Characters | Films | | | | | Television series | |
| Characters | Raiders of the Lost Ark | Indiana Jones and the Temple of Doom | Indiana Jones and the Last Crusade | Indiana Jones and the Kingdom of the Crystal Skull | Indiana Jones and the Dial of Destiny | The Young Indiana Jones Chronicles | |
| Characters | Raiders of the Lost Ark | Indiana Jones and the Temple of Doom | Indiana Jones and the Last Crusade | Indiana Jones and the Kingdom of the Crystal Skull | Indiana Jones and the Dial of Destiny | Season 1 | Season 2 |
|---|---|---|---|---|---|---|---|
| Dr. Henry "Indiana" Jones, Jr. | Harrison Ford | Harrison Ford | Harrison Ford River Phoenix^{Y} | Harrison Ford | Harrison Ford | Sean Patrick Flanery (age 16–21) Corey Carrier (age 8–10) George Hall (age 93) Harrison Ford (age 50) Boutalat (age 5) Neil Boulane^{I} | |
| Marcus Brody | Denholm Elliott | | Denholm Elliott | Denholm Elliott^{P} | | | |
| Sallah | John Rhys-Davies | | John Rhys-Davies | John Rhys-Davies^{P} | John Rhys-Davies | | |
| Marion Ravenwood | Karen Allen | | | Karen Allen | Karen Allen^{C} | | |
| René Emile Belloq | Paul Freeman | | | | | | |
| Major Arnold Ernst Toht | Ronald Lacey | | | | | | |
| Colonel Herman Dietrich | Wolf Kahler | | | | | | |
| Wilhelmina "Willie" Scott | | Kate Capshaw | | Kate Capshaw^{P} | | | |
| Wan "Short Round" Li | | Ke Huy Quan | | | | | |
| Mola Ram | | Amrish Puri | | | | | |
| Professor Henry Jones Sr. | | | Sean Connery Alex Hyde-White^{Y} | Sean Connery^{P} | Sean Connery^{P} | Lloyd Owen | Lloyd Owen |
| Walter Donovan | | | Julian Glover | | | | |
| Dr. Elsa Schneider | | | Alison Doody | | | | |
| Colonel Ernst Vogel | | | Michael Byrne | | | | |
| Henry "Mutt" Jones III | | | | Shia LaBeouf | Shia LaBeouf^{P} | | |
| Irina Spalko | | | | Cate Blanchett | | | |
| George "Mac" Michale | | | | Ray Winstone | | | |
| Professor Harold Oxley | | | | John Hurt | | | |
| Helena Shaw | | | | | Phoebe Waller-Bridge Holly Lawton^{Y} | | |
| Jürgen Voller | | | | | Mads Mikkelsen | | |
| Colonel Weber | | | | | Thomas Kretschmann | | |
| Klaber | | | | | Boyd Holbrook | | |
| Agent Mason | | | | | Shaunette Renée Wilson | | |
| Basil Shaw | | | | | Toby Jones | | |
| Teddy Kumar | | | | | Ethann Isidore | | |
| Renaldo | | | | | Antonio Banderas | | |
| Anna Mary Jones | Mentioned | | Mentioned | | | Ruth De Sosa | Ruth De Sosa |
| Helen Seymour | | | | | | Margaret Tyzack | Margaret Tyzack |
| Remy Baudouin | | | | | | Ronny Coutteure | Ronny Coutteure |

=== Additional crew and production details ===
| Film | Executive producers | Composer | Editor | Cinematographer | Production company | Distributor |
|---|---|---|---|---|---|---|
| Raiders of the Lost Ark | George Lucas & Howard Kazanjian | John Williams | Michael Kahn | Douglas Slocombe | Lucasfilm Ltd. | Paramount Pictures |
| Indiana Jones and the Temple of Doom | George Lucas & Frank Marshall | John Williams | Michael Kahn | Douglas Slocombe | Lucasfilm Ltd. | Paramount Pictures |
| Indiana Jones and the Last Crusade | George Lucas & Frank Marshall | John Williams | Michael Kahn | Douglas Slocombe | Lucasfilm Ltd. | Paramount Pictures |
| Indiana Jones and the Kingdom of the Crystal Skull | George Lucas & Kathleen Kennedy | John Williams | Michael Kahn | Janusz Kamiński | Lucasfilm Ltd. | Paramount Pictures |
| Indiana Jones and the Dial of Destiny | Steven Spielberg & George Lucas | John Williams | Michael McCusker, Andrew Buckland & Dirk Westervelt | Phedon Papamichael | Walt Disney Pictures; Lucasfilm Ltd. | Walt Disney Studios Motion Pictures (Note: As part of the 2013 deal transferring the distribution rights of future Indiana Jones films from Paramount Pictures to the Walt Disney Studios, Paramount retained a residual associate credit ("in association with Paramount Pictures") in the film's credits and promotional materials.) |

== Reception ==
=== Box office performance ===
| Film | Original release date | Total box office gross | | | Box office ranking | | Budget | Ref |
| Film | Original release date | North America | Other territories | Worldwide | All time North America | All time worldwide | Budget | Ref |
|---|---|---|---|---|---|---|---|---|
| Raiders of the Lost Ark | June 12, 1981 | $248,159,971 | $141,766,000 | $389,925,971 | No. 85 (#20^{(A)}) | No. 237 | $18 million | |
| Indiana Jones and the Temple of Doom | May 23, 1984 | $179,870,271 | $153,237,000 | $333,107,271 | No. 187 (#86^{(A)}) | No. 321 | $28 million | |
| Indiana Jones and the Last Crusade | May 24, 1989 | $197,171,806 | $277,000,000 | $474,171,806 | No. 153 (#99^{(A)}) | No. 174 | $48 million | |
| Indiana Jones and the Kingdom of the Crystal Skull | May 22, 2008 | $317,101,119 | $473,552,823 | $790,653,942 | No. 76 (#131^{(A)}) | No. 93 | $185 million | |
| Indiana Jones and the Dial of Destiny | June 30, 2023 | $174,480,468 | $209,482,589 | $383,963,057 | No. 312 | No. 390 | $294 million (Note: While Disney officially reported spending $294.7 million producing the film, other figures including $295 million or "$300 million+" have been reported.) | |
| Total | | $1,116,783,635 | $1,255,038,412 | $2,371,822,047 | | | $574 – $679 million | |
List indicator^{(A)} indicates the adjusted totals based on current ticket prices (calculated by Box Office Mojo).

=== Critical and public response ===
| Film | Critical | | Public |
| Film | Rotten Tomatoes | Metacritic | CinemaScore |
|---|---|---|---|
| Raiders of the Lost Ark | 94% (157 reviews) | 86 (17 reviews) | A+ |
| Indiana Jones and the Temple of Doom | 77% (138 reviews) | 57 (14 reviews) | —N/a |
| Indiana Jones and the Last Crusade | 84% (136 reviews) | 65 (14 reviews) | A |
| Indiana Jones and the Kingdom of the Crystal Skull | 77% (307 reviews) | 65 (40 reviews) | B |
| Indiana Jones and the Dial of Destiny | 71% (439 reviews) | 58 (65 reviews) | B+ |

=== Accolades ===
The series has been nominated for 14 Academy Awards, of which they have won 7. Raiders of the Lost Ark was also given a Special Achievement Award for Best Sound Effects Editing.

==== Raiders of the Lost Ark (1981) ====
| Award | Category | Recipient/Nominee | Result |
|---|---|---|---|
| Academy Awards | Best Picture | Frank Marshall | Nominated |
| Academy Awards | Best Director | Steven Spielberg | Nominated |
| Academy Awards | Best Cinematography | Douglas Slocombe | Nominated |
| Academy Awards | Best Film Editing | Michael Kahn | Won |
| Academy Awards | Best Original Score | John Williams | Nominated |
| Academy Awards | Best Production Design | Norman Reynolds, Leslie Dilley, Michael D. Ford | Won |
| Academy Awards | Best Sound | Bill Varney, Steve Maslow, Gregg Landaker, Roy Charman | Won |
| Academy Awards | Best Visual Effects | Richard Edlund, Kit West, Bruce Nicholson, Joe Johnston | Won |
| Academy Awards | Special Achievement Academy Award | Ben Burtt, Richard L. Anderson (for Sound Effects Editing) | Won |
| British Academy Film Awards | Best Film | Frank Marshall | Nominated |
| British Academy Film Awards | Best Actor in a Supporting Role | Denholm Elliott | Nominated |
| British Academy Film Awards | Best Cinematography | Douglas Slocombe | Nominated |
| British Academy Film Awards | Best Editing | Michael Kahn | Nominated |
| British Academy Film Awards | Best Original Music | John Williams | Nominated |
| British Academy Film Awards | Best Production Design | Norman Reynolds | Won |
| British Academy Film Awards | Best Sound | Roy Charman, Ben Burtt, Bill Varney | Nominated |
| Directors Guild of America Awards | Outstanding Directing – Feature Film | Steven Spielberg | Nominated |
| Golden Globe Awards | Best Director | Steven Spielberg | Nominated |
| Saturn Awards | Best Fantasy Film | Indiana Jones and the Raiders of the Lost Ark | Won |
| Saturn Awards | Best Director | Steven Spielberg | Won |
| Saturn Awards | Best Actor | Harrison Ford | Won |
| Saturn Awards | Best Actress | Karen Allen | Won |
| Saturn Awards | Best Supporting Actor | Paul Freeman | Nominated |
| Saturn Awards | Best Writing | Lawrence Kasdan | Won |
| Saturn Awards | Best Costume Design | Deborah Nadoolman Landis | Nominated |
| Saturn Awards | Best Music | John Williams | Won |
| Saturn Awards | Best Special Effects | Richard Edlund | Won |
| Writers Guild of America Awards | Best Original Screenplay | Lawrence Kasdan, George Lucas, Philip Kaufman | Nominated |

==== Indiana Jones and the Temple of Doom (1984) ====
| Award | Category | Recipient/Nominee | Result |
|---|---|---|---|
| Academy Awards | Best Original Score | John Williams | Nominated |
| Academy Awards | Best Visual Effects | Dennis Muren, Michael J. McAlister, Lorne Peterson, George Gibbs | Won |
| British Academy Film Awards | Best Cinematography | Douglas Slocombe | Nominated |
| British Academy Film Awards | Best Editing | Michael Kahn | Nominated |
| British Academy Film Awards | Best Sound | Ben Burtt, Simon Kaye, Laurel Ladevich | Nominated |
| British Academy Film Awards | Best Special Visual Effects | Dennis Muren, George Gibbs, Michael J. McAlister, Lorne Peterson | Won |
| Saturn Awards | Best Fantasy Film | Indiana Jones and the Temple of Doom | Nominated |
| Saturn Awards | Best Director | Steven Spielberg | Nominated |
| Saturn Awards | Best Actor | Harrison Ford | Nominated |
| Saturn Awards | Best Performance by a Younger Actor | Ke Huy Quan | Nominated |
| Saturn Awards | Best Writing | Willard Huyck, Gloria Katz | Nominated |
| Saturn Awards | Best Costume Design | Anthony Powell | Nominated |
| Saturn Awards | Best Make-up | Tom Smith | Nominated |

==== Indiana Jones and the Last Crusade (1989) ====
| Award | Category | Recipient/Nominee | Result |
|---|---|---|---|
| Academy Awards | Best Original Score | John Williams | Nominated |
| Academy Awards | Best Sound Editing | Richard Hymns, Ben Burtt | Won |
| Academy Awards | Best Sound Mixing | Ben Burtt, Gary Summers, Shawn Murphy, Tony Dawe | Nominated |
| British Academy Film Awards | Best Actor in a Supporting Role | Sean Connery | Nominated |
| British Academy Film Awards | Best Sound | Richard Hymns, Tony Dawe, Ben Burtt, Gary Summers, Shawn Murphy | Nominated |
| British Academy Film Awards | Best Special Visual Effects | George Gibbs, Michael J. McAlister, Mark Sullivan, John Ellis | Nominated |
| Golden Globe Awards | Best Supporting Actor | Sean Connery | Nominated |
| Saturn Awards | Best Fantasy Film | Indiana Jones and the Last Crusade | Nominated |
| Saturn Awards | Best Actor | Harrison Ford | Nominated |
| Saturn Awards | Best Writing | Jeffrey Boam | Nominated |
| Saturn Awards | Best Costume Design | Anthony Powell, Joanna Johnston | Nominated |

==== Indiana Jones and the Kingdom of the Crystal Skull (2008) ====
| Award | Category | Recipient/Nominee | Result |
|---|---|---|---|
| British Academy Film Awards | Best Special Visual Effects | Pablo Helman, Marshall Krasser, Steve Rawlins | Nominated |
| Critics' Choice Awards | Best Action Movie | Indiana Jones and the Kingdom of the Crystal Skull | Nominated |
| Golden Raspberry Awards | Worst Prequel, Remake, Rip-off or Sequel | Indiana Jones and the Kingdom of the Crystal Skull | Won |
| MTV Movie Awards | Best Summer Movie So Far | Indiana Jones and the Kingdom of the Crystal Skull | Nominated |
| Saturn Awards | Best Science Fiction Film | Indiana Jones and the Kingdom of the Crystal Skull | Nominated |
| Saturn Awards | Best Director | Steven Spielberg | Nominated |
| Saturn Awards | Best Actor | Harrison Ford | Nominated |
| Saturn Awards | Best Supporting Actor | Shia LaBeouf | Nominated |
| Saturn Awards | Best Costume Design | Mary Zophres | Won |
| Saturn Awards | Best Special Effects | Pablo Helman, Daniel Sudick | Nominated |
| Screen Actors Guild Awards | Outstanding Performance by a Stunt Ensemble in a Motion Picture | Indiana Jones and the Kingdom of the Crystal Skull | Nominated |
| Visual Effects Society Awards | Best Single Visual Effect of the Year | Stephanie Hornish, Pablo Helman, Jeff White, Craig Hammack | Nominated |
| Visual Effects Society Awards | Outstanding Matte Paintings in a Feature Motion Picture | Richard Bluff, Barry Williams, Yannick Dusseault, Yusei Uesugi | Nominated |
| Visual Effects Society Awards | Outstanding Models and Miniatures in a Feature Motion Picture | David Fogler, Craig Hammack, Brian Gernand, Geoff Herson | Nominated |
| Visual Effects Society Awards | Outstanding Created Environment in a Feature Motion Picture | Michael Halsted, David Fogler, Steve Walton, David Weitzberg | Nominated |

==== Indiana Jones and the Dial of Destiny (2023) ====
| Award | Category | Recipient/Nominee | Result |
|---|---|---|---|
| Academy Awards | Best Original Score | John Williams | Nominated |
| Golden Raspberry Awards | Worst Remake, Rip-off, or Sequel | | Nominated |
| Golden Raspberry Awards | Worst Screenplay | Jez Butterworth, John-Henry Butterworth, David Koepp, and James Mangold | Nominated |
| Saturn Awards | Best Fantasy Film | | Won |
| Saturn Awards | Best Actor | Harrison Ford | Won |
| Saturn Awards | Best Director | James Mangold | Nominated |
| Saturn Awards | Best Supporting Actress | Phoebe Waller-Bridge | Nominated |
| Saturn Awards | Best Supporting Actor | Mads Mikkelsen | Nominated |
| Saturn Awards | Best Music | John Williams | Won |
| Saturn Awards | Best Special Effects | | Nominated |
| Screen Actors Guild Awards | Outstanding Performance by a Stunt Ensemble in a Motion Picture | | Nominated |
| Visual Effects Society Awards | Outstanding Visual Effects in a Photoreal Feature | | Nominated |
| Visual Effects Society Awards | Outstanding Created Environment in a Photoreal Feature | | Nominated |

== Literature ==
=== Novels ===
A novelization of Raiders of the Lost Ark was written by Campbell Black and published by Ballantine Books in April 1981. It was followed by Indiana Jones and the Temple of Doom, written by James Kahn and published by Ballantine in May 1984. Finally, Indiana Jones and the Last Crusade was published in May 1989, and was the first Indiana Jones novel by Rob MacGregor. A fan of the first two films, MacGregor admitted that writing the novelization made him "somewhat disappointed" with the third film, as he had expanded the script whereas Steven Spielberg had cut scenes to tighten the story.

George Lucas asked MacGregor to continue writing original novels for Bantam Books. These were geared toward an adult or young adult audience, and were prequels set in the 1920s or early 1930s after Jones graduates from college. Of the film characters, Lucas only permitted Marcus Brody to appear. He asked MacGregor to base the books on real myths, but except for the deletion of a sex scene, the writer was given total creative freedom. His six books – Indiana Jones and the Peril at Delphi, Indiana Jones and the Dance of the Giants, Indiana Jones and the Seven Veils, Indiana Jones and the Genesis Deluge, Indiana Jones and the Unicorn's Legacy, and Indiana Jones and the Interior World – were published from February 1991 to November 1992. The Genesis Deluge, published in February 1992 and featuring Noah's Ark, was the bestselling novel; MacGregor felt this was because it "had a strong following among religious-oriented people [...] because they tend to take the Noah's Ark story to heart and think of it as history and archaeological fact, rather than myth." MacGregor's favorite book was The Seven Veils, which featured real-life explorer Percy Fawcett and the death of Indiana's wife, Deirdre Campbell.

Martin Caidin wrote the next two novels in Bantam's series, Indiana Jones and the Sky Pirates and Indiana Jones and the White Witch. These feature Gale Parker as Indiana's sidekick; they introduced afterwords to the series, regarding each novel's historical context.

Caidin became ill, so Max McCoy took over in 1995 and wrote the final four novels: Indiana Jones and the Philosopher's Stone, Indiana Jones and the Dinosaur Eggs, Indiana Jones and the Hollow Earth, and Indiana Jones and the Secret of the Sphinx. McCoy set his books closer in time to the events of Raiders of the Lost Ark, which led to his characterizing Indiana as "a bit darker". The prologue of his first book featured a crystal skull, and this became a recurring story, concluding when Jones gives it up in the final novel. Lucas's involvement with McCoy's novels was limited, although Lucasfilm censored sexual or outlandish elements to make the books appeal to younger readers; they also rejected the theme of time travel in the final book. Sallah, Lao Che, Rene Belloq and the Nazis made appearances, and McCoy also pitted Jones against Benito Mussolini's fascists and the Japanese. Jones also has a doomed romance with Alecia Dunstin, a librarian at the British Museum. A novel involving the Spear of Destiny was dropped, because Dark Horse Comics was developing the idea.

The books were only published in paperback, as the series editor felt readers would not be prepared to pay the hardback price for an adventure novel.

In February 2008, the novelizations of the first three films were published in a single-volume edition; James Rollins' Kingdom of the Crystal Skull novelization arrived the following May. Children's novelizations of all four films were published by Scholastic in 2008.

MacGregor was said to be writing new books for Ballantine for early 2009, but none have been published.

A new adult adventure, Indiana Jones and the Army of the Dead by Steve Perry, was released in September 2009.

A novel based on the video game Indiana Jones and the Staff of Kings, written by MacGregor to coincide with the release of the game, was canceled due to problems around the game's production.

Additionally, German author Wolfgang Hohlbein wrote eight Indiana Jones novels in the early 1990s, which were never translated to English.

==== List of novels ====
All of the following were published by Bantam Books, with the exception of Army of the Dead, which was published by Del Rey.

- Indiana Jones and the Peril at Delphi (Feb 1991) – by Rob MacGregor
- Indiana Jones and the Dance of the Giants (June 1991) – by Rob MacGregor
- Indiana Jones and the Seven Veils (Dec 1991) – by Rob MacGregor
- Indiana Jones and the Genesis Deluge (Feb 1992) – by Rob MacGregor
- Indiana Jones and the Unicorn's Legacy (Sept 1992) – by Rob MacGregor
- Indiana Jones and the Interior World (1992) – by Rob MacGregor
- Indiana Jones and the Sky Pirates (Dec 1993) – by Martin Caidin
- Indiana Jones and the White Witch (1994) – by Martin Caidin
- Indiana Jones and the Philosopher's Stone (1995) – by Max McCoy
- Indiana Jones and the Dinosaur Eggs (1996) – by Max McCoy
- Indiana Jones and the Hollow Earth (1997) – by Max McCoy
- Indiana Jones and the Secret of the Sphinx (1999) – by Max McCoy
- Indiana Jones and the Army of the Dead (2009) – by Steve Perry

Indiana Jones novels by Wolfgang Hohlbein:

- Indiana Jones und die Gefiederte Schlange (1990) – (Indiana Jones and the Feathered Snake)
- Indiana Jones und das Schiff der Götter (1990) – (Indiana Jones and the Longship of the Gods)
- Indiana Jones und das Gold von El Dorado (1991) – (Indiana Jones and the Gold of El Dorado)
- Indiana Jones und das verschwundene Volk (1991) – (Indiana Jones and the Lost People)
- Indiana Jones und das Schwert des Dschingis Khan (1991) – (Indiana Jones and the Sword of Genghis Khan)
- Indiana Jones und das Geheimnis der Osterinseln (1992) – (Indiana Jones and the Secret of Easter Island)
- Indiana Jones und das Labyrinth des Horus (1993) – (Indiana Jones and the Labyrinth of Horus)
- Indiana Jones und das Erbe von Avalon (1994) – (Indiana Jones and the Legacy of Avalon)

=== Children's novels ===
==== Find Your Fate ====
Ballantine Books published a number of Indiana Jones books in the Find Your Fate line, written by various authors. These books were similar to the Choose Your Own Adventure series, allowing the reader to select from options that change the outcome of the story. Indiana Jones books comprised 11 of the 17 releases in the line, which was initially titled Find Your Fate Adventure.

- Indiana Jones and the Curse of Horror Island (June 1984) – R. L. Stine
- Indiana Jones and the Lost Treasure of Sheba (June 1984) – Rose Estes
- Indiana Jones and the Giants of the Silver Tower (Aug 1984) – R. L. Stine
- Indiana Jones and the Eye of the Fates (Aug 1984) – Richard Wenk
- Indiana Jones and the Cup of the Vampire (Oct 1984) – Andy Helfer
- Indiana Jones and the Legion of Death (Dec 1984) – Richard Wenk
- Indiana Jones and the Cult of the Mummy's Crypt (Feb 1985) – R. L. Stine
- Indiana Jones and the Dragon of Vengeance (Apr 1985) – Megan Stine and H. William Stine
- Indiana Jones and the Gold of Genghis Khan (May 1985) – Ellen Weiss
- Indiana Jones and the Ape Slaves of Howling Island (1986) – R. L. Stine
- Indiana Jones and the Mask of the Elephant (Feb 1987) – Megan Stine and H. William Stine

==== Scholastic ====
In 2008, Scholastic released a series of new young adult novelizations of the first three films. Each book of this edition included several pages of color stills from filming.

- Indiana Jones and the Raiders of the Lost Ark – Ryder Windham
- Indiana Jones and the Temple of Doom – Suzanne Weyn
- Indiana Jones and the Last Crusade – Ryder Windham

In May 2009, two new young adult books were published, intended as the first of a new series of Untold Adventures, though no further books appeared.

- Indiana Jones and the Pyramid of the Sorcerer – Ryder Windham
- Indiana Jones and the Mystery of Mount Sinai – J.W. Rinzler

=== Young Indiana Jones ===
In the early 1990s, different book series featured childhood and young adult adventures of Indiana Jones in the early decades of the century. Not all were directly tied to the Young Indiana Jones Chronicles TV series.

==== Random House ====
The following books are set in Jones's mid- to late-teen years.

- Young Indiana Jones and the Plantation Treasure (1990) – by William McCay
- Young Indiana Jones and the Tomb of Terror (1990) – by Les Martin
- Young Indiana Jones and the Circle of Death (1990) – by William McCay
- Young Indiana Jones and the Secret City (1990) – by Les Martin
- Young Indiana Jones and the Princess of Peril (1991) – by Les Martin
- Young Indiana Jones and the Gypsy Revenge (1991) – by Les Martin
- Young Indiana Jones and the Ghostly Riders (1991) – by William McCay
- Young Indiana Jones and the Curse of Ruby Cross – by William McCay
- Young Indiana Jones and the Titanic Adventure (1993) – by Les Martin
- Young Indiana Jones and the Lost Gold of Durango (1993) – by Megan Stine and H. William Stine
- Young Indiana Jones and the Face of the Dragon – by William McCay
- Young Indiana Jones and the Journey to the Underworld (1994) – by Megan Stine and H. William Stine
- Young Indiana Jones and the Mountain of Fire (1994) – by William McCay
- Young Indiana Jones and the Pirates' Loot (1994) – by J.N. Fox
- Young Indiana Jones and the Eye of the Tiger (1995) – by William McCay
- Young Indiana Jones and the Mask of the Madman (unpublished) – by Megan Stine and H. William Stine
- Young Indiana Jones and the Ring of Power (unpublished) – Megan Stine

==== Random House ====
These books were novelizations of episodes of the TV series. Some feature Jones around age 8; others have him age 16–18.

- The Young Indiana Jones Chronicles: The Mummy's Curse – by Megan Stine and H. William Stine
- The Young Indiana Jones Chronicles: Field of Death – by Les Martin
- The Young Indiana Jones Chronicles: Safari Sleuth – by A.L. Singer
- The Young Indiana Jones Chronicles: The Secret Peace – by William McCay
- The Young Indiana Jones Chronicles: The Trek of Doom – by Les Martin
- The Young Indiana Jones Chronicles: Revolution! – by Gavin Scott
- The Young Indiana Jones Chronicles: Race to Danger – by Stephanie Calmenson
- The Young Indiana Jones Chronicles: Prisoner of War – by Sam Mclean

==== Bantam Books ====
These are labeled Choose Your Own Adventure books. Like the TV series, some feature Jones around age 8, others age 16–18.

The Young Indiana Jones Chronicles:

- The Valley of the Kings – by Richard Brightfield
- South of the Border – by Richard Brightfield
- Revolution in Russia – by Richard Brightfield
- Masters of the Louvre – by Richard Brightfield
- African Safari – by Richard Brightfield
- Behind the Great Wall – by Richard Brightfield
- The Roaring Twenties – by Richard Brightfield
- The Irish Rebellion – by Richard Brightfield

==== Ballantine Books ====
Young Indiana Jones:

- The Mata Hari Affair – by James Luceno
- The Mummy's Curse – by Parker Smith

==== Graphic novels ====
- The Curse of the Jackal – by Dan Barry
- The Search for the Oryx – by Dan Barry
- The Peril of the Fort – by Dan Barry

==== Non-fiction books ====
- Lost Diaries of Young Indiana Jones – by Eric D. Weiner
- The Young Indiana Jones Chronicles: On the Set and Behind the Scenes – by Dan Madsen
- Indiana Jones Explores Ancient Egypt – by John Malam
- Indiana Jones Explores Ancient Rome – by John Malam
- Indiana Jones Explores Ancient Greece – by John Malam
- Indiana Jones Explores The Vikings – by John Malam
- Indiana Jones Explores The Incas – by John Malam
- Indiana Jones Explores The Aztecs – by John Malam

=== Comic books ===
Indiana Jones has appeared in numerous comic books, from two different publishers. Marvel Comics initially held the comic book licensing rights, leading to adaptations of the films Raiders of the Lost Ark, Indiana Jones and the Temple of Doom, and Indiana Jones and the Last Crusade. Following the Raiders of the Lost Ark adaptation, Marvel published The Further Adventures of Indiana Jones from 1983 to 1986. This ongoing monthly series ran for thirty-four issues and featured the character's first original adventures in comic book form.

After Marvel's licensing of the character ended, Dark Horse Comics acquired publishing rights and adapted the Indiana Jones and the Fate of Atlantis video game. From 1992 to 1996, following the Fate of Atlantis adaptation, Dark Horse published seven limited series, as well comics based on The Young Indiana Jones Chronicles television series. In 2004, Indiana Jones appeared in the non-canon story, "Into the Great Unknown", first published in Star Wars Tales #19. The story sees Indiana Jones and Short Round discover a crashed Millennium Falcon in the Pacific Northwest, along with Han Solo's skeleton and the realization that a rumored nearby Sasquatch is in fact Chewbacca. With the franchise's revival in 2008, Dark Horse published an adaptation of Indiana Jones and the Kingdom of the Crystal Skull. Dark Horse followed this with Indiana Jones Adventures, a short-lived series of digest-sized comics aimed at children. An additional limited series, titled Indiana Jones and the Tomb of the Gods, was also published from 2008 to 2009.

== Other media ==
=== Theme park attractions ===
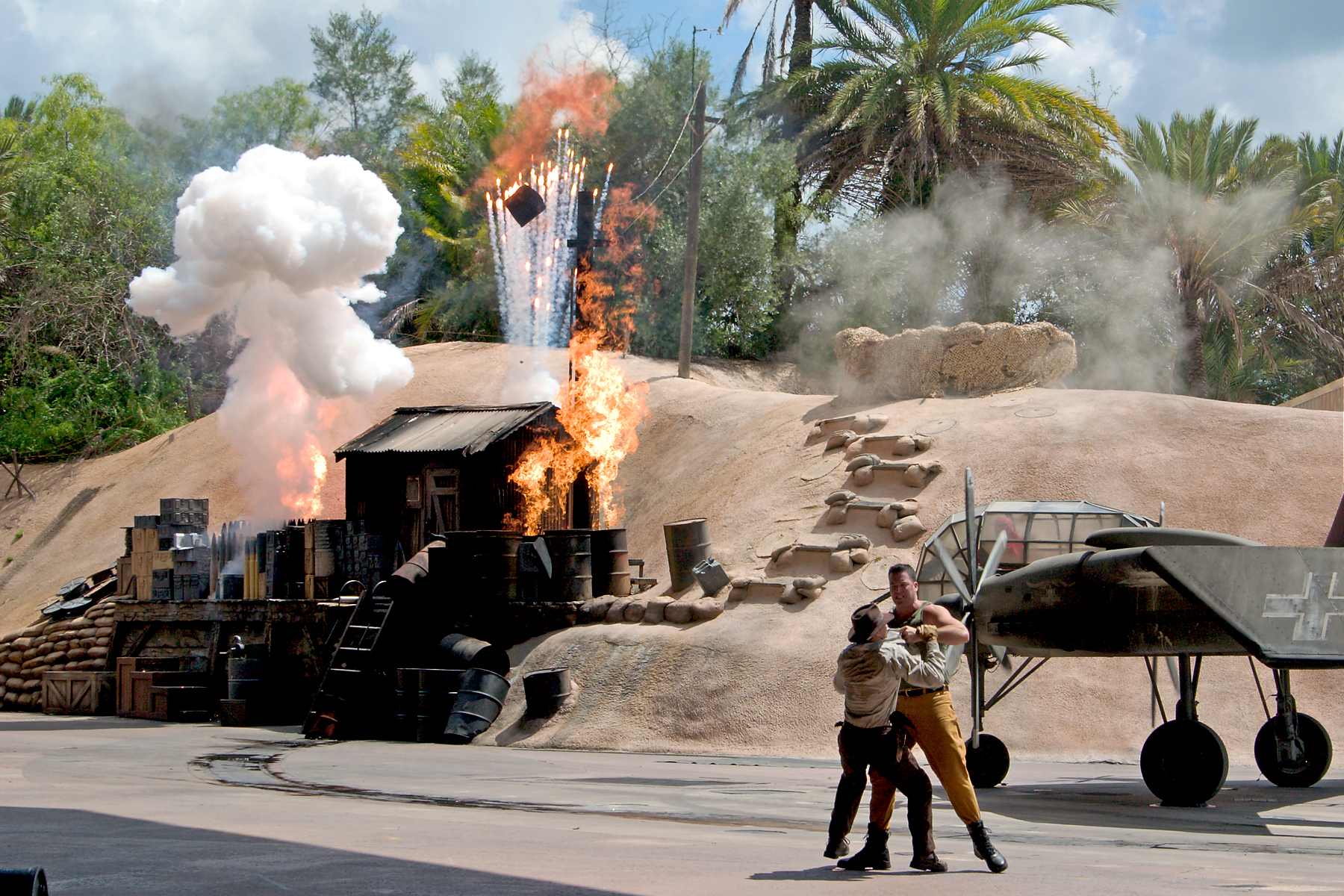
Action on the set of the "Indiana Jones Epic Stunt Spectacular!"

Prior to Disney's acquisition, George Lucas collaborated with Walt Disney Imagineering on several occasions to create Indiana Jones attractions for Disney Experiences worldwide. Indiana Jones-themed attractions and appearances at Disney theme parks include:

- The Indiana Jones Epic Stunt Spectacular! show opened at Disney's Hollywood Studios in Lake Buena Vista, Florida, in 1989.
- The Indiana Jones et le Temple du Péril roller-coaster opened at Disneyland Paris in Marne-la-Vallée, France, in 1993.
- Three versions of Indiana Jones Adventure, including the first version, which opened in Adventureland at Disneyland as Temple of the Forbidden Eye in Anaheim, California, in 1995, the second version, which opened in Lost River Delta at Tokyo DisneySea as Temple of the Crystal Skull in Chiba, Japan, in 2001, and following the announcement, it was reportedly that more details at the 2024 and 2026 D23 expo on August, which revealed that the third version as Myth of the Jade Serpent, which will be open in Tropical Americas at Disney's Animal Kingdom in Orlando, Florida, in 2027.
- An Indiana Jones-themed bar lounge, "Jock Lindsey's Hangar Bar", opened in 2015 at Disney Springs at the Walt Disney World Resort.
- From 1989 until its closure in 2017, The Great Movie Ride at Disney's Hollywood Studios featured a scene based on Raiders of the Lost Ark.

=== Toy lines ===
For the holiday season following the June 1981 debut of Raiders of the Lost Ark, Kenner produced a 12-inch-tall (30 cm) "Authentically styled Action Figure" of Indiana Jones. The next spring they delivered nine smaller-scale (3 3/4") action figures, three playsets, replicas of the German desert convoy truck and Jones's horse, all derived from the Raiders movie. They also offered a Raiders board game.

In conjunction with the theatrical release of The Temple of Doom in 1984, TSR, Inc. released miniature metal versions of twelve characters from both films for a role playing game. LJN Toys Ltd. also released action figures of Jones, Mola Ram, and the Giant Thugee.

No toys were produced to tie in with The Last Crusade in 1989.

Hasbro released toys based on Raiders of the Lost Ark and Kingdom of the Crystal Skull in 2008. Further figures, including characters from The Temple of Doom and The Last Crusade, followed later in the year, but were distributed on a very limited basis. This line of toys included 3 3/4-inch (9.5 cm) and 12-inch (30 cm) figures, vehicles, a playset, and a series of "Adventure Heroes" aimed at young children. Hasbro announced the cancellation of the line in the fall of 2008, due to decreasing sales, although some figures continued to be released up until the 2011 San Diego Comic Convention.

Sideshow Collectibles, Gentle Giant, Diamond Select Toys and Kotobukiya also earned Indiana Jones licensing rights in 2008. Lego released eight play sets to coincide with the fourth film, based on Raiders and The Last Crusade as well as on Kingdom of the Crystal Skull

Merchandise featuring franchise cross-overs include a Mr. Potato Head "Taters of the Lost Ark" set by Hasbro, Mickey Mouse as Indiana Jones, and a Muppets-branded Adventure Kermit action figure, produced by Palisades Toys and based on the frog's appearance in the Disney World stunt show as seen in The Muppets at Walt Disney World.

Disney Vinylmation introduced a series based on Indiana Jones characters in 2014.

Hasbro also made the "Adventure Series" line in 2023 to go alongside the release of Dial of Destiny. This line included figures from the original trilogy as well as the new film.

=== Role-playing games ===
There have been two publications of role-playing games based on the Indiana Jones franchise. The Adventures of Indiana Jones Role-Playing Game was designed and published by TSR, Inc. under license in 1984. Ten years later, West End Games acquired the rights to publish their own version, The World of Indiana Jones.

=== Pinball ===
A pinball machine based on the first three films was released in 1993. Stern Pinball released a new pinball machine based on the series in 2008, which featured all four movies.

== See also ==
- Tomb Raider
- Uncharted
- Relic Hunter
- Warehouse 13
- The Librarian
