= Seven Veils =

Seven Veils or Dance of the Seven Veils may refer to:

- Dance of the Seven Veils, Salome's dance before King Herod, depicted in popular culture

== Music ==
- "Dance of the Seven Veils", a leitmotif by Richard Strauss from the 1905 opera Salome
- Dance of the Seven Veils, a 1996 album by Newband
- Seven Veils (Robert Rich album), 1998
- "Seven Veils", a 1927 song by Buddy DeSylva, Lew Brown and Ray Henderson
- "Seven Veils", a song by Peter Murphy from the 1989 album Deep
- "The Seven Veils", a song by Raymond Watts (as PIG) on the 1993 album The Swining
- "Dance of the Seven Veils", a song by Liz Phair from the 1993 album Exile in Guyville

== Film ==
- Seven Veils (film), a 2023 Canadian drama
- Dance of the Seven Veils (film), a 1970 British film about Richard Strauss

== See also ==
- Seven Veils of Silence, a 2004 album by Hecate
- Indiana Jones and the Seven Veils, a 1991 novel part of the Indiana Jones franchise
