= Adventure World =

Adventure World may refer to:

- Adventure World (amusement park) in Perth, Australia
- Former name of Six Flags America amusement park in Maryland, United States
- American Adventure World, a former theme park in East Midlands, United Kingdom
- Indiana Jones Adventure World, a video game
- Adventure World (Japan), a mega theme park with a safari park, aquarium and amusement park
