= Indiana Jones in the Lost Kingdom =

1984 video game

- Publisher: Mindscape
- Programmer: Michael J. Hanson
- Series: Indiana Jones
- Platform: Commodore 64
- Release: NA: 1984
- Genre: Puzzle
- Modes: Single-player, multiplayer

Indiana Jones in the Lost Kingdom is a puzzle video game developed by Michael J. Hanson and published by Mindscape for the Commodore 64. The game is based on the Indiana Jones series, and it was released in North America in late 1984. In the UK, the game was imported and distributed by U.S. Gold.

Gameplay requires the player to think like fictional archaeologist Indiana Jones to solve the puzzles of each level, as the game does not provide the player with any rules or gameplay information; the game's cover advertised: "Nobody told Indiana Jones the rules. And no one will tell you".

== Gameplay ==
Indiana Jones in the Lost Kingdom features six levels played across a "Lost Kingdom". Playing as Indiana Jones, the player must solve a puzzle in each level to progress through the game. The player's ultimate goal is to retrieve a valuable artifact that contains the secrets of a lost civilization, before Jones' arch-rival, Ivar Reiss, can take it for himself. Indiana Jones is armed only with a mystical cane, and he must battle against numerous enemies and perils throughout the game, including bats, monsters, steep cliffs, twisting mazes, and "killer snowflakes". Joystick movements vary between each level, requiring the player to relearn the control scheme throughout the game. A two-player option is also available.

No rules or gameplay information is provided to the player, who is left to use logic and intuition to solve each puzzle, as Indiana Jones would. Solving each puzzle requires the player to pay close attention to subtle changes in each level's surroundings or musical score, as well as other possibilities, testing the player's "Indiana Jones Quotient" (IJQ). However, the game's instruction manual does feature clues at the bottom of each page. Each clue is presented as a hieroglyphic, and must be deciphered by the player using a magic viewer, similar to 3D glasses. A "clue hotline" was also available for players, providing them with pre-recorded hints on how to finish each level.

== Reception ==
The game appeared at number 10 in the UK Commodore 64 charts for the week ending 3 January 1985.

Robert J. Sodaro of Ahoy! wrote: "I must admit, the lure of the Lost Kingdom is strong, but having to fumble through several sessions without direction almost sent me hying back to civilization. No documentation may have sounded good in the planning stages, but at the game-playing stage, engaging and coherent instructions would have sounded much better. If you have the tenacity to muddle through, however, you'll find much enjoyment in accompanying Indy on his further adventures. A fellow reviewer once wrote that a good game was one he'd return to play after the review was written. For me, Indiana Jones is one of those games".

DX Fenten of Commodore Power/Play wrote: "Should you be the kind of person who can sit, hour after hour, enjoying the challenge of trying to figure out what the creators had in mind and 'think like Dr. Jones', there is a very good chance you will love this game. Otherwise, you'll soon need either a break from the game, some aspirin, or some additional help in the way of clues". Fenten concluded: "There is a great deal to be admired and enjoyed in this program. There is also a great deal that is just a little bit forbidding to the 'regular' game player. The key seems to be your desire to win the game, to stick with it, to endure the changing requirements throughout the game and to accept the challenge created by the omission of any written rules".

Benn Dunnington of INFO=64 gave the game three stars out of five and wrote that the game's "packaging, marketing, concept, and intended cinematic associations fail to translate into a satisfying product. This game is boring, roughly animated, and sure to disappoint Indiana Jones fans. Better title: 'Indiana Jones in the Kingdom of Lost Causes'". Dennis Lynch of the Chicago Tribune wrote: "Players more interested in fancy graphics and slick joystick action may find the game a little dull. But those who prefer thinking their way through a problem will find plenty to puzzle over".

Commodore Computing International rated the game three stars out of five and wrote that the "less-than-peppy" opening theme was among the game's "several mild disappointments", saying that the game "doesn't quite live up to its name, though it certainly is still worth a determined try". The magazine criticized the game's "average" graphics but praised the "clearly drawn" Indiana Jones figure. Computer and Video Games criticized the game's difficulty, including its puzzles: "You have to do certain things in a certain way or a certain order before you get to the next screen. It can get quite frustrating". The magazine concluded: "The graphics are OK but not brilliant and the sound could be better. Overall a bit of a disappointing game given that it's based on the exploits of such a superhero as Indiana Jones".
