= Indiana Jones (character) =

Title character of the Indiana Jones franchise

- Indiana Jones character
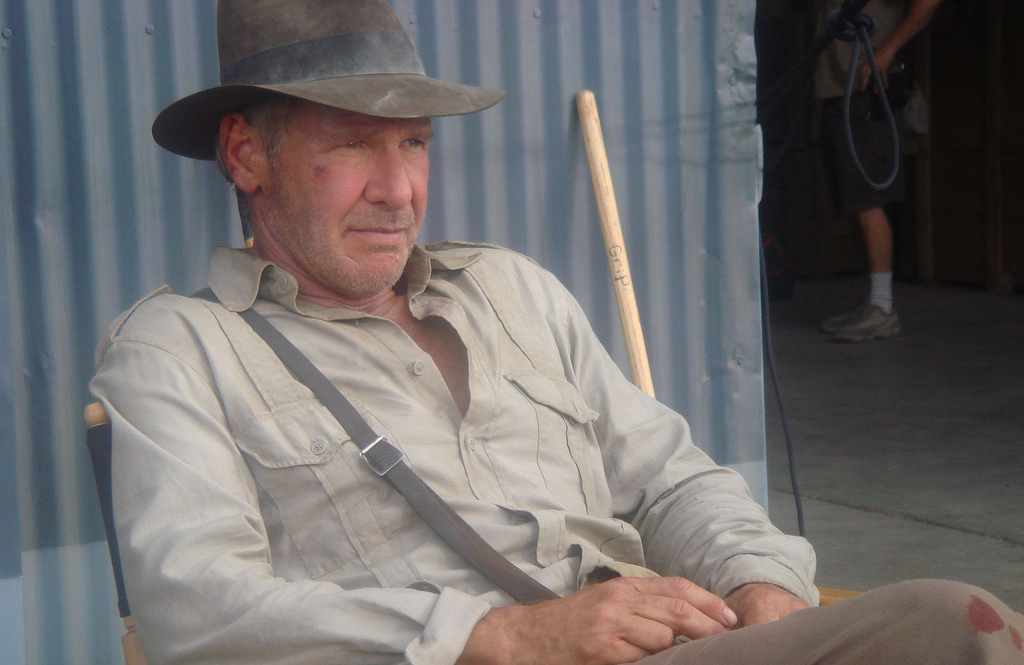
- Harrison Ford as Indiana Jones in Indiana Jones and the Kingdom of the Crystal Skull (2008)
- First appearance: Raiders of the Lost Ark (1981)
- Created by: George Lucas
- Portrayed by: Harrison Ford; River Phoenix (age 13); Television series: Corey Carrier (ages 8–10); Sean Patrick Flanery (ages 16–21); Harrison Ford (age 51); George Hall (age 93); Other: Neil Boulane (infant); Boutalat (age 3)
- Voiced by: Doug Lee (Fate of Atlantis, Infernal Machine); David Esch (Emperor's Tomb); John Armstrong (Staff of Kings); Dave Temple (Indiana Jones Adventure); Troy Baker (Great Circle)

In-universe information
- Full name: Henry Walton Jones, Jr.
- Nicknames: "Junior"; Doctor Jones; Indiana; Indy; Henri; Defense; Mungo Kidogo; Captain Dynamite, Scourge of the Kaiser; Jonesy; Strambo
- Titles: Doctor (PhD); Professor; Captain (Belgian Army) (WWI); Colonel (United States Army) (WWII)
- Occupation: Archaeologist; U.S. Army Officer (OSS); Historian; Linguist; College Professor; Antiquarian
- Fighting style: Hand-to-hand combat
- Weapon: Bullwhip; Smith & Wesson M1917; Smith & Wesson Hand Ejector II
- Family: Henry Walton Jones Sr. (father, deceased); Anna Mary Jones (mother, deceased); Susie Jones (sister, deceased)
- Spouses: Deirdre Campbell Jones (1926); Marion Ravenwood Jones (1957–present)
- Significant others: Willie Scott (Temple of Doom); Elsa Schneider (Last Crusade); Molly Walder (fiancée, deceased)
- Children: Sophie Jones (daughter); Henry Walton "Mutt" Williams-Jones III (deceased son); Wan "Short Round" Li (adoptive son)
- Relatives: Grace Jones (aunt); Fred Jones (uncle); Frank Jones (cousin); Adrien Powell (brother-in-law); Joanna Campbell (mother-in-law); Abner Ravenwood (father-in-law); Spike (grandson); Lucy (granddaughter); Caroline Jones (granddaughter); Harry Jones (great-grandson); Annie Jones (great-granddaughter); Helena Shaw (goddaughter)
- Religion: Catholic (nominal)
- Nationality: American

Dr. Henry Walton "Indiana" Jones, Jr., often called "Indy" for short, is the title character and protagonist of the Indiana Jones franchise. George Lucas created the character in homage to the action heroes of 1930s film serials. The character first appeared in the 1981 film Raiders of the Lost Ark, to be followed by Indiana Jones and the Temple of Doom in 1984, Indiana Jones and the Last Crusade in 1989, The Young Indiana Jones Chronicles from 1992 to 1996, Indiana Jones and the Kingdom of the Crystal Skull in 2008, and Indiana Jones and the Dial of Destiny in 2023. The character is also featured in novels, comics, video games, and other media. Jones is also the inspiration for several Disney theme park attractions, including Indiana Jones and the Temple of Peril, the Indiana Jones Adventure, and Epic Stunt Spectacular! attractions.

Jones is most famously portrayed by Harrison Ford and has also been portrayed by River Phoenix (as the young Jones in The Last Crusade), and by Corey Carrier, Sean Patrick Flanery, and George Hall in the television series The Young Indiana Jones Chronicles. Doug Lee has supplied the voice of Jones for two LucasArts video games, Indiana Jones and the Fate of Atlantis and Indiana Jones and the Infernal Machine, David Esch supplied his voice for Indiana Jones and the Emperor's Tomb, and John Armstrong for Indiana Jones and the Staff of Kings. Troy Baker provides the voice and motion capture for the character in Indiana Jones and the Great Circle (2024).

Jones is characterized by his iconic accoutrements (bullwhip, fedora, satchel, and leather jacket), wry, witty and sarcastic sense of humor, deep knowledge of ancient civilizations and languages, and fear of snakes.

Since his first appearance in Raiders of the Lost Ark, Indiana Jones has become one of cinema's most famous characters. In 2003, the American Film Institute ranked him the second-greatest film hero of all time. He was also named the greatest movie character by Empire magazine. Entertainment Weekly ranked Jones 2nd on their list of The All-Time Coolest Heroes in Pop Culture. Premiere magazine placed Jones at number 7 on their list of The 100 Greatest Movie Characters of All Time.

== Appearances ==
=== Films and television installments in the chronological order ===
- The Young Indiana Jones Chronicles (1992–1996)
- Indiana Jones and the Temple of Doom (1984)
- Raiders of the Lost Ark (1981)
- Indiana Jones and the Last Crusade (1989)
- Indiana Jones and the Kingdom of the Crystal Skull (2008)
- Indiana Jones and the Dial of Destiny (2023)

A native of Princeton, New Jersey, Indiana Jones was introduced as a tenured professor of archaeology in the 1981 film Raiders of the Lost Ark, set in 1936. The Joneses are a family of paternal Scottish descent. The character is an adventurer reminiscent of the 1930s film serial treasure hunters and pulp action heroes. His research is funded by Marshall College (a fictional school named after producer Frank Marshall), where he is a professor of archaeology. He studied under the Egyptologist and archaeologist Abner Ravenwood at the Oriental Institute at the University of Chicago.

==== Raiders of the Lost Ark (1981) ====
In the first adventure, Raiders of the Lost Ark, set in 1936, Indiana Jones is pitted against Nazis commissioned by Hitler to recover artifacts of great power from the Old Testament (see Nazi archaeology). In consequence, Jones travels the world to prevent them from recovering the Ark of the Covenant (see also Biblical archaeology). He is aided by Marion Ravenwood and Sallah. The Nazis are led by Jones's archrival, a Nazi-sympathizing French archaeologist named René Belloq, and Arnold Toht, a sinister Gestapo agent.

==== The Temple of Doom (1984) ====
In the 1984 prequel, Indiana Jones and the Temple of Doom, set in 1935, Jones travels to India and attempts to free enslaved children and the three Sankara stones from the bloodthirsty Thuggee cult. He is aided by Wan "Short Round" Li, a boy played by Ke Huy Quan, and is accompanied by singer Willie Scott (Kate Capshaw). The prequel is not as centered on archaeology as Raiders of the Lost Ark and is considerably darker.

==== The Last Crusade (1989) ====
The third film, 1989's Indiana Jones and the Last Crusade, set in 1938, returned to the formula of the original, reintroducing characters such as Sallah and Marcus Brody, a scene from Professor Jones' classroom (he now teaches at Barnett College), the globe-trotting element of multiple locations, and the return of the infamous Nazi mystics, this time trying to find the Holy Grail. The film's introduction, set in 1912, provided some backstory to the character, specifically the origin of his fear of snakes, his use of a bullwhip, the scar on his chin, and his hat; the film's epilogue also reveals that "Indiana" is not Jones' first name, but a nickname he took from the family dog. The film was a buddy movie of sorts, teaming Indiana with his father, Henry Jones, Sr., often to comical effect. Although Lucas intended to make five Indiana Jones films, Indiana Jones and the Last Crusade was the last for over 18 years, as he could not think of a good plot element to drive the next installment.

==== The Young Indiana Jones Chronicles (1992–1996) ====
George Hall portrayed the 93-year-old Indiana Jones in The Young Indiana Jones Chronicles.

From 1992 to 1996, Lucas wrote and executive-produced The Young Indiana Jones Chronicles, a television series aimed mainly at teenagers and children, which showed many of the important events and historical figures of the early 20th century through the prism of Jones' life.

The show initially featured the formula of an elderly (93 to 94 years of age) Indiana Jones played by George Hall introducing a story from his youth by way of an anecdote: the main part of the episode then featured an adventure with either a young adult Indy (16 to 21 years of age) played by Sean Patrick Flanery or a child Indy (8 to 10 years) played by Corey Carrier. One episode, "Young Indiana Jones and the Mystery of the Blues", is bookended by Harrison Ford as Indiana Jones, rather than Hall. Later episodes and telemovies did not have this bookend format.

The bulk of the series centers around the young adult Indiana Jones and his activities during World War I as a 16- to 17-year-old soldier in the Belgian Army and then as an intelligence officer and spy seconded to French intelligence. The child Indiana episodes follow the boy's travels around the globe as he accompanies his parents on his father's worldwide lecture tour from 1908 to 1910.

The show provided some backstory for the films, as well as new information regarding the character. Indiana Jones was born July 1, 1899, and his middle name is Walton (Lucas's middle name). It is also mentioned that he had a sister called Suzie who died as an infant of fever, and that he eventually has a daughter and grandchildren who appear in some episode introductions and epilogues. His relationship with his father, first introduced in Indiana Jones and the Last Crusade, was further fleshed out with stories about his travels with his father as a young boy. Jones damages or loses his right eye sometime between the events of 1969 and the early 1990s, when the "Old Indy" segments take place, as the elderly Indiana Jones wears an eyepatch.

In 1999, Lucas removed the episode introductions and epilogues by George Hall for the VHS and DVD releases and re-edited the episodes into chronologically ordered feature-length stories. The series title was also changed to The Adventures of Young Indiana Jones.

==== The Kingdom of the Crystal Skull (2008) ====
The 2008 film, Indiana Jones and the Kingdom of the Crystal Skull, is the fourth film in the series. Set in 1957, nineteen years after the third film, it pits an older, wiser Indiana Jones against Soviet KGB agents bent on harnessing the power of an extraterrestrial device discovered in South America. Jones is aided in his adventure by his former lover, Marion Ravenwood (Karen Allen), and her son—a young greaser named Henry "Mutt" Williams (Shia LaBeouf), later revealed to be Jones' unknown child. There were rumors that Harrison Ford would not return for any future installments and LaBeouf would take over the franchise. This film also reveals that Jones was recruited by the Office of Strategic Services during World War II, attaining the rank of colonel in the United States Army, and that in 1947 he was forced to investigate the Roswell UFO incident, and the investigation saw that he was involved in affairs related to Hangar 51. He is tasked with conducting covert operations with MI6 agent George McHale against the Soviet Union.

==== The Dial of Destiny (2023) ====
The 2023 film, Indiana Jones and the Dial of Destiny, is the fifth and final film in the series. Set in 1969—twelve years after the fourth film and during the height of the Space Race—Jones has moved to New York City, teaching at Hunter College with plans to retire, after his marriage with Marion collapsed following Mutt's death in the Vietnam War. Once his estranged goddaughter Helena Shaw (Phoebe Waller-Bridge) arrives asking for Archimedes' Dial, a relic Jones and her father Basil retrieved from the Nazis in 1944 during the Allied liberation of Europe in World War II, a Nazi-turned-NASA scientist Jürgen Voller (Mads Mikkelsen) starts pursuing Jones, wanting to exploit the Dial's unusual properties to change the outcome of World War II. As the film concludes, Indiana and Marion are reconciled.

=== Attractions ===
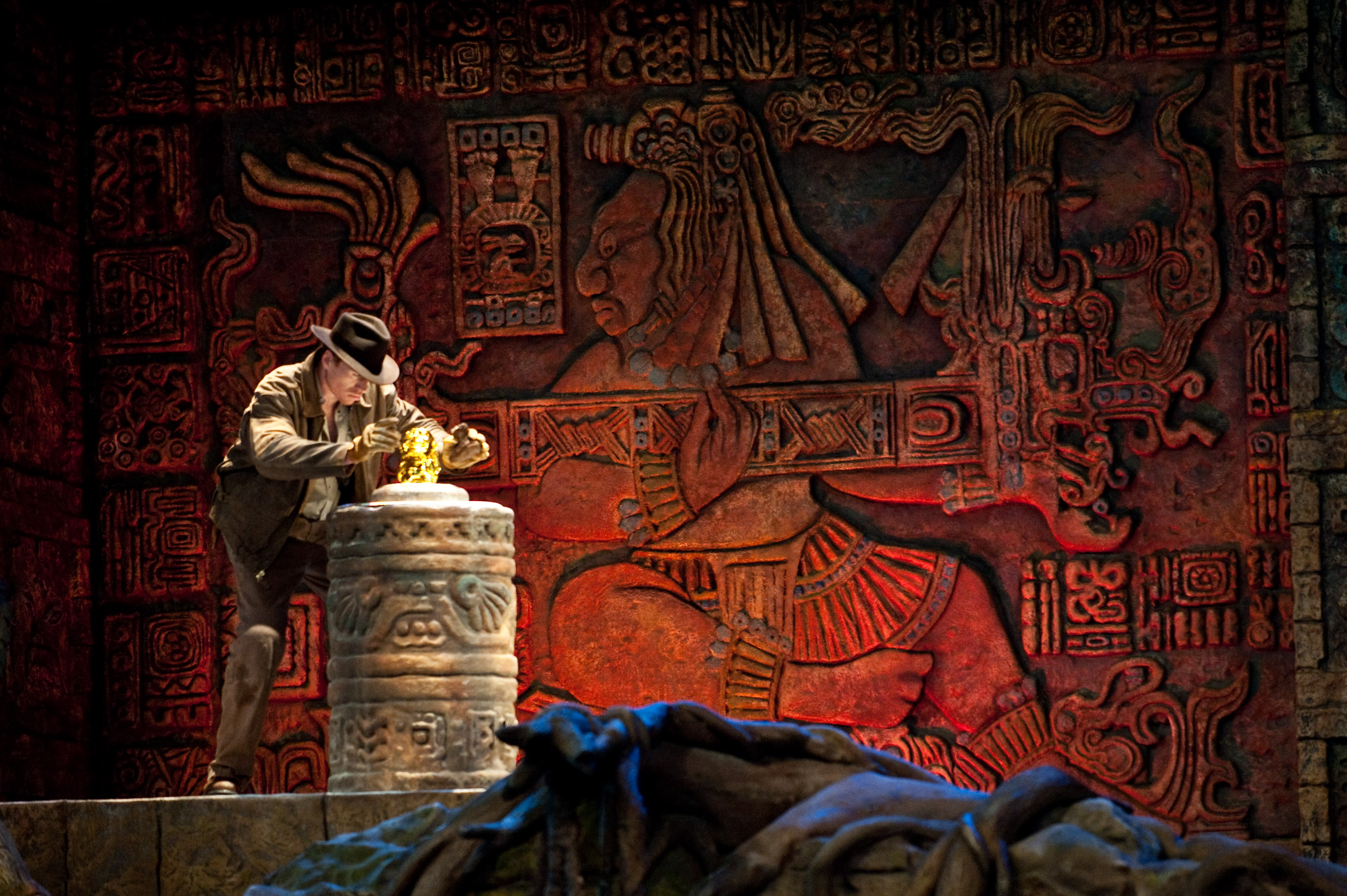
Indiana Jones as he appears at Disney theme parks.

Indiana Jones is featured at several Walt Disney theme park attractions. The Indiana Jones Adventure attractions at Disneyland and Tokyo DisneySea ("Temple of the Forbidden Eye" and "Temple of the Crystal Skull," respectively) place Indy at the forefront of two similar archaeological discoveries. These two temples each contain a wrathful deity who threatens the guests who ride through World War II troop transports. The attractions, some of the most expensive of their kind at the time, opened in 1995 and 2001, respectively, with sole design credit attributed to Walt Disney Imagineering. Ford was approached to reprise his role as Indiana Jones, but ultimately negotiations to secure Ford's participation broke down in December 1994, for unknown reasons. Instead, Dave Temple provided the voice of Jones. Ford's physical likeness, however, has nonetheless been used in subsequent Audio-animatronic figures for the attractions.

Disneyland Paris also features an Indiana Jones-titled ride where people speed off through ancient ruins in a runaway mine wagon similar to that found in Indiana Jones and the Temple of Doom. Indiana Jones and the Temple of Peril is a looping roller coaster engineered by Intamin, designed by Walt Disney Imagineering, and opened in 1993.

The Indiana Jones Epic Stunt Spectacular! is a live show that has been presented in the Disney's Hollywood Studios theme park of the Walt Disney World Resort with few changes since the park's 1989 opening, as Disney-MGM Studios. The 25-minute show presents various stunts framed in the context of a feature film production and recruits members of the audience to participate in the show. Stunt artists in the show re-create and ultimately reveal some of the secrets of the stunts of the Raiders of the Lost Ark films, including the well-known "running-from-the-boulder" scene. Stunt performer Anislav Varbanov was fatally injured in August 2009, while rehearsing the show. Also formerly at Disney's Hollywood Studios, an audio-animatronic Indiana Jones appeared in another attraction; during The Great Movie Ride's Raiders of the Lost Ark segment.

=== Literature ===
==== Comic books ====
Indiana Jones has appeared in numerous comic books, from two different publishers. Marvel Comics initially held the comic book licensing rights, leading to adaptations of the films Raiders of the Lost Ark, Indiana Jones and the Temple of Doom, and Indiana Jones and the Last Crusade. Following the Raiders of the Lost Ark adaptation, Marvel published The Further Adventures of Indiana Jones from 1983 to 1986. This ongoing monthly series ran for thirty-four issues and featured the character's first original adventures in comic book form.

After Marvel's licensing of the character ended, Dark Horse Comics acquired publishing rights and adapted the Indiana Jones and the Fate of Atlantis video game. From 1992 to 1996, following the Fate of Atlantis adaptation, Dark Horse published seven limited series, as well as comics based on The Young Indiana Jones Chronicles television series. In 2004, Indiana Jones appeared in the non-canon story, "Into the Great Unknown", first published in Star Wars Tales #19. The story sees Indiana Jones and Short Round discover a crashed Millennium Falcon in the Pacific Northwest, along with Han Solo's skeleton and the realization that a rumored nearby Sasquatch is Chewbacca. With the franchise's revival in 2008, Dark Horse published an adaptation of Indiana Jones and the Kingdom of the Crystal Skull. Dark Horse followed this with Indiana Jones Adventures, a short-lived series of digest-sized comics aimed at children. An additional limited series, titled Indiana Jones and the Tomb of the Gods, was also published from 2008 to 2009.

==== Movie tie-in novelizations ====
The first four Indiana Jones film scripts were novelized and published in the time frame of the films' initial releases. Raiders of the Lost Ark was novelized by Campbell Black based on the script by Lawrence Kasdan that was based on the story by George Lucas and Philip Kaufman and published in April 1981 by Ballantine Books; Indiana Jones and the Temple of Doom was novelized by James Kahn and based on the script by Willard Huyck & Gloria Katz that was based on the story by George Lucas and published May 1984 by Ballantine Books; Indiana Jones and the Last Crusade was novelized by Rob MacGregor based on the script by Jeffrey Boam that was based on a story by George Lucas and Menno Meyjes and published June 1989 by Ballantine Books.

Nearly 20 years later Indiana Jones and the Kingdom of the Crystal Skull was novelized by James Rollins based on the script by David Koepp based on the story by George Lucas and Jeff Nathanson and published in May 2008 by Ballantine Books. In addition, in 2008 to accompany the release of Kingdom of the Crystal Skull, Scholastic Books published juvenile novelizations of the four scripts written, successively in the order above, by Ryder Windham, Suzanne Weyn, Ryder Windham, and James Luceno. All these books have been reprinted, with Raiders of the Lost Ark being retitled Indiana Jones and the Raiders of the Lost Ark. While these are the principal titles and authors, there are numerous other volumes derived from the four film properties.

==== Original novels ====
From February 1991 through February 1999, 12 original Indiana Jones-themed adult novels were licensed by Lucasfilm, Ltd. and written by three genre authors of the period. Ten years afterward, a 13th original novel was added, also written by a popular genre author. The first 12 were published by Bantam Books; the last by Ballantine Books in 2009. (See Indiana Jones (franchise) for broad descriptions of these original adult novels.) The novels are:

===== Written by Rob MacGregor =====
- Indiana Jones and the Peril at Delphi, February 1991.
- Indiana Jones and the Dance of the Giants, June 1991.
- Indiana Jones and the Seven Veils, December 1991.
- Indiana Jones and the Genesis Deluge, February 1992.
- Indiana Jones and the Unicorn's Legacy, September 1992.
- Indiana Jones and the Interior World, December 1992.

===== Written by Martin Caidin =====
- Indiana Jones and the Sky Pirates, December 1993.
- Indiana Jones and the White Witch, April 1994.

===== Written by Max McCoy =====
- Indiana Jones and the Philosopher's Stone, May 1995.
- Indiana Jones and the Dinosaur Eggs, March 1996.
- Indiana Jones and the Hollow Earth, March 1997.
- Indiana Jones and the Secret of the Sphinx, February 1999.

===== Written by Steve Perry =====
- Indiana Jones and the Army of the Dead, September 2009.

=== Video games ===
The character has appeared in several officially licensed games, beginning with adaptations of Raiders of the Lost Ark, Indiana Jones and the Temple of Doom, two adaptations of Indiana Jones and the Last Crusade (one with purely action mechanics, one with an adventure- and puzzle-based structure) and Indiana Jones' Greatest Adventures, which included the storylines from all three of the original films.

Following this, the games branched off into original storylines with Indiana Jones in the Lost Kingdom, Indiana Jones and the Fate of Atlantis, Indiana Jones and the Infernal Machine, Indiana Jones and the Emperor's Tomb and Indiana Jones and the Staff of Kings. Emperor's Tomb sets up Jones' companion Wu Han and the search for Nurhaci's ashes seen at the beginning of Temple of Doom. The first two games were developed by Hal Barwood and starred Doug Lee as the voice of Indiana Jones; Emperor's Tomb had David Esch fill the role and Staff of Kings starred John Armstrong.

Indiana Jones and the Infernal Machine was the first Indy-based game presented in three dimensions, as opposed to 8-bit graphics and side-scrolling games before.

There is also a small game from LucasArts Indiana Jones and His Desktop Adventures. A video game was made for young Indy called Young Indiana Jones and the Instruments of Chaos, as well as a video game version of The Young Indiana Jones Chronicles.

Two Lego Indiana Jones games have also been released. Lego Indiana Jones: The Original Adventures was released in 2008 and follows the plots of the first three films. It was followed by Lego Indiana Jones 2: The Adventure Continues in late 2009. The sequel includes an abbreviated reprise of the first three films, but focuses on the plot of Indiana Jones and the Kingdom of the Crystal Skull. However, before he got his own Lego games, he appeared as a secret character in Lego Star Wars: The Complete Saga as a playable character. He also makes a brief appearance in a minigame in Lego Star Wars III: The Clone Wars during the level "Hostage Crisis", and also made a cameo alongside Henry Jones Sr. in the level "Legacy of Terror".

Social gaming company Zynga introduced Indiana Jones to their Adventure World game in late 2011.

Indiana Jones appears in Fortnite Battle Royale as part of the Chapter 3 Season 3 Battle pass.

The world building game Disney Magic Kingdoms includes Indiana Jones as a playable character to unlock for a limited time.

An original Indiana Jones game, Indiana Jones and the Great Circle, released in 2024; it was developed by MachineGames and published by Bethesda Softworks for Windows and Xbox Series X/S, with Troy Baker voicing the character. It features a standalone narrative taking place in Italy during 1937, placing it between the events of Raiders of the Lost Ark and Indiana Jones and the Last Crusade.

== Character description and formation ==
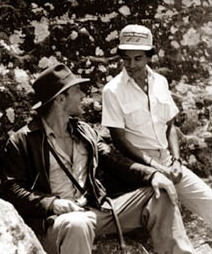
Harrison Ford as Jones (left) in Indiana Jones and the Temple of Doom.

"Indiana" Jones's full name is Dr. Henry Walton Jones, Jr., and his nickname is often shortened to "Indy".

In his role as a college professor of archaeology Jones is scholarly, wears a tweed suit, and lectures on ancient civilizations. At the opportunity to recover important artifacts, Dr. Jones transforms into "Indiana," a "non-superhero superhero" image he has concocted for himself. Producer Frank Marshall said, "Indy [is] a fallible character. He makes mistakes and gets hurt. ... That's the other thing people like: He's a real character, not a character with superpowers." Spielberg said there "was the willingness to allow our leading man to get hurt and to express his pain and to get his mad out and to take pratfalls and sometimes be the butt of his own jokes. I mean, Indiana Jones is not a perfect hero, and his imperfections, I think, make the audience feel that, with a little more exercise and a little more courage, they could be just like him." According to Spielberg biographer Douglas Brode, Indiana created his heroic figure so as to escape the dullness of teaching at a school. Both of Indiana's personas reject one another in philosophy, creating a duality. Harrison Ford said the fun of playing the character was that Indiana is both a romantic and a cynic, while scholars have analyzed Indiana as having traits of a lone wolf; a man on a quest; a noble treasure hunter; a hardboiled detective; a human superhero; and an American patriot.

Like many characters in his films, Jones has some autobiographical elements of Spielberg. Indiana lacks a proper father figure because of his strained relationship with his father, Henry Jones Sr. His own contained anger is misdirected towards Professor Abner Ravenwood, his mentor at the University of Chicago, leading to a strained relationship with Marion Ravenwood. The teenage Indiana bases his own look on a figure from the prologue of Indiana Jones and the Last Crusade, after being given his hat. Marcus Brody acts as Indiana's positive role model at the college. Indiana's own insecurities are made worse by the absence of his mother. In Indiana Jones and the Temple of Doom, he becomes the father figure to Short Round, to survive; he is rescued from Kali's evil by Short Round's dedication. In Raiders of the Lost Ark, he is wise enough to close his eyes in the presence of God in the Ark of the Covenant. By contrast, his rival Rene Belloq is killed for having the audacity to try to communicate directly with God.

In the prologue of Indiana Jones and the Last Crusade, Jones is seen as a teenager, establishing his look when given a fedora hat. Indiana's intentions are revealed as prosocial, as he believes artifacts "belong in a museum." In the film's climax, Indiana undergoes "literal" tests of faith to retrieve the Grail and save his father's life. He also remembers Jesus as a historical figure—a humble carpenter—rather than an exalted figure when he recognizes the simple nature and tarnished appearance of the real Grail amongst a large assortment of much more ornately decorated ones. Henry Senior rescues his son from falling to his death when reaching for the fallen Grail, telling him to "let it go," overcoming his mercenary nature. The Young Indiana Jones Chronicles explains how Indiana becomes solitary and less idealistic following his service in World War I. In Indiana Jones and the Kingdom of the Crystal Skull, Jones is older and wiser, whereas his sidekicks Mutt and Mac are youthfully arrogant, and greedy, respectively.

== Origins and inspirations ==
Indiana Jones is modeled after the strong-jawed heroes of the matinée serials and pulp magazines that George Lucas and Steven Spielberg enjoyed in their childhoods (such as the Republic Pictures serials, and the Doc Savage series). Sir H. Rider Haggard's safari guide and big game hunter Allan Quatermain, who appeared in King Solomon's Mines (1885) and its seventeen sequels and prequels, is a notable template for Jones. The two friends first discussed the project in Hawaii around the time of the release of the first Star Wars film. Spielberg told Lucas how he wanted his next project to be something fun, like a James Bond film (this would later be referenced when they cast Sean Connery as Henry Jones, Sr.). According to sources, Lucas responded to the effect that he had something "even better", or that he had "got that beat."

One of the possible bases for Indiana Jones is Professor Challenger, created by Sir Arthur Conan Doyle in 1912 for his novel, The Lost World. Challenger was based on Doyle's physiology professor, William Rutherford, an adventuring academic, albeit a zoologist/anthropologist.

Another important influence on the development of the character Indiana Jones is the Disney character Scrooge McDuck. Carl Barks created Scrooge in 1947 as a one-off relation for Donald Duck in the latter's self-titled comic book. Barks realized that the character had more potential, so a separate Uncle Scrooge comic book series full of exciting and strange adventures in the company of his duck nephews was developed. This Uncle Scrooge comic series strongly influenced George Lucas. This appreciation of Scrooge as an adventurer influenced the development of Jones, with the prologue of Raiders of the Lost Ark containing homage to Barks' Scrooge adventure "The Seven Cities of Cibola", published in Uncle Scrooge #7 from September 1954. This homage in the film takes the form of playfully mimicking the removal-of-the-statuette-from-its-pedestal and the falling-stone sequences of the comic book.

The character was originally named Indiana Smith, after an Alaskan Malamute called Indiana that Lucas owned in the 1970s and on which he based the Star Wars character Chewbacca. Spielberg disliked the name Smith, and Lucas casually suggested Jones as an alternative. The Last Crusade script references the name's origin, with Jones' father revealing his son's birth name to be Henry and explaining that "we named the dog Indiana", to his son's chagrin. Some have also posited that C.L. Moore's science fiction character Northwest Smith may have also influenced Lucas and Spielberg in their naming choice.

Lucas has said on various occasions that Sean Connery's portrayal of British secret agent James Bond was one of the primary inspirations for Jones, a reason Connery was chosen for the role of Indiana's father in Indiana Jones and the Last Crusade. Spielberg earned the rank of Eagle Scout and Ford the Life Scout badge in their youth, which gave them the inspiration to portray Indiana Jones as a Life Scout at age 13 in The Last Crusade.

=== Historical models ===
Many people are said to be the real-life inspiration of the Indiana Jones character—although none of the following have been confirmed as inspirations by Lucas or Spielberg. There are some suggestions listed here in alphabetical order by last name:

- Beloit College professor and paleontologist Roy Chapman Andrews.
- Edgar James Banks (May 23, 1866 – May 5, 1945) – American diplomat, antiquarian and novelist. Banks is credited with the sale of an ancient cuneiform tablet famously known as Plimpton 322 proving the Babylonians beat the Greeks to the invention of trigonometry—the study of triangles—by more than 1,000 years.
- Italian archaeologist and circus strongman Giovanni Battista Belzoni (1778–1823).
- Yale University professor, historian, US senator, and explorer Hiram Bingham III, (1875–1956) who rediscovered and excavated the lost city of Machu Picchu, and chronicled his find in the bestselling book The Lost City of the Incas in 1948.
- University of Chicago archaeologist Robert Braidwood.
- University of Chicago archaeologist James Henry Breasted.
- Frederick Russell Burnham, the celebrated American scout and British Army spy who heavily influenced Haggard's fictional Allan Quatermain character and also became the inspiration for the Scouting movement.
- British archaeologist Percy Fawcett, who spent much of his life exploring the jungles of northern Brazil, and who was last seen in 1925 returning to the Amazon Basin to look for the Lost City of Z. A fictionalized version of Fawcett appears to Jones in the book Indiana Jones and the Seven Veils.
- American archaeologist Walter Fairservis.
- Harvard University paleontologist Farish Jenkins.
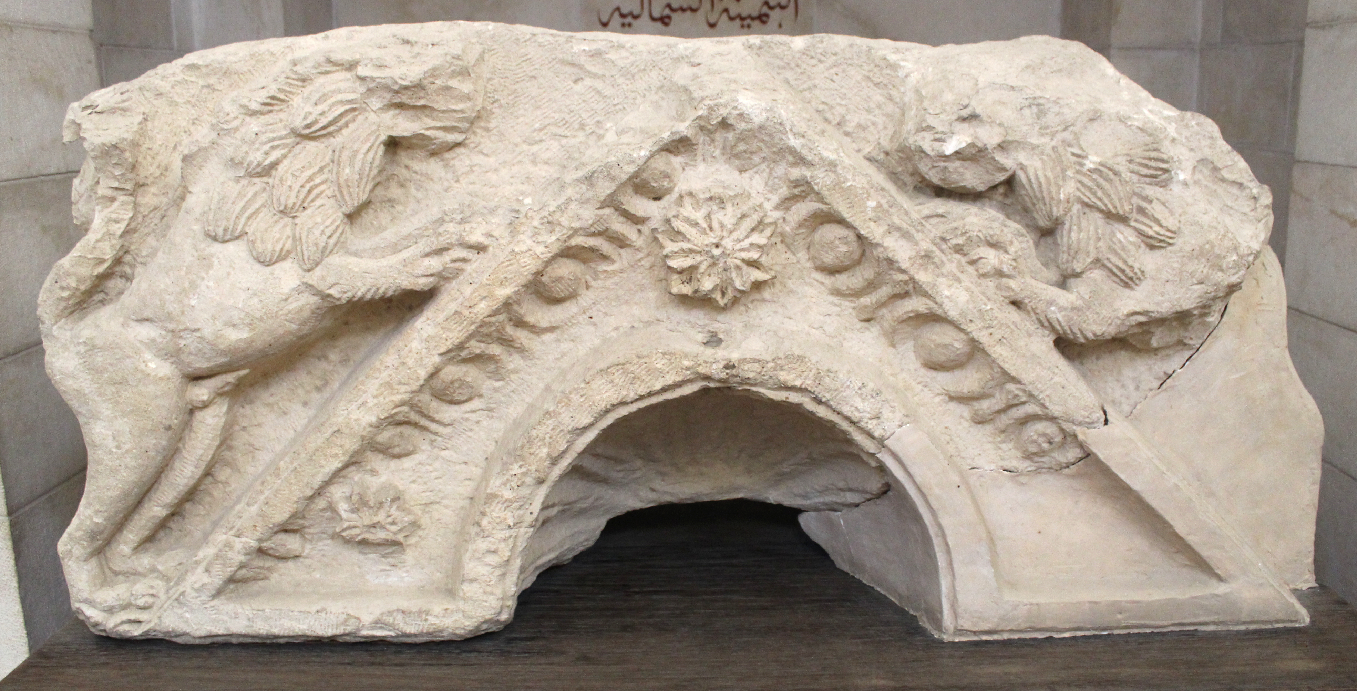
- Ark of Nabratein synagogue, found in 1981, inviting comparisons of discoverers Eric and Carol Meyers to Indy and Marion.
  Duke University biblical scholar, archeologist, and Bernice and Morton Lerner Emeritus Professor in Judaic Studies Eric M. Meyers, who with his wife and Mary Grace Wilson Professor Emerita of Religious Studies Carol Lyons Meyers uncovered the oldest known remnant of an ark found to date. It was unearthed at Nabratein synagogue in Israel around the time Raiders was released, prompting media interest and a photo of the Meyers dressed as Indy and Marion in People magazine.
- Northwestern University political scientist, anthropologist, professor and adventurer William Montgomery McGovern.
- American archaeologist and adventurer Wendell Phillips led well-publicized expeditions in Africa and the Arabian Peninsula in the 1940s and 1950s.
- American chess expert and adventurer Albert Pinkus, a Manhattan Chess Club member who innovated the 2 Knights Defense, and went on expeditions into South America.
- German archaeologist Otto Rahn.
- Harvard University archaeologist and art historian Langdon Warner.
- Vendyl Jones (1930–2010) led digs in Israel searching for the holy ark. He discovered items identified as the Temple incense and a clay vessel for holy anointing oil. In his 2005 book A Door of Hope: My Search for the Treasures of the Copper Scroll, he discusses the similarities.

== Costume ==
Upon requests by Spielberg and Lucas, costume designer Deborah Nadoolman gave the character a distinctive silhouette through the styling of the hat; after examining many hats, Nadoolman chose a tall-crowned, wide-brimmed fedora. As a documentary of Raiders pointed out, the hat served a practical purpose. Following the lead of the old "B"-movies that inspired the Indiana Jones series, the fedora hid the actor's face sufficiently to allow doubles to perform the more dangerous stunts seamlessly. Examples in Raiders include the wider-angle shot of Indy and Marion crashing a statue through a wall, and Indy sliding under a fast-moving vehicle from front to back. Thus it was necessary for the hat to stay in place much of the time.

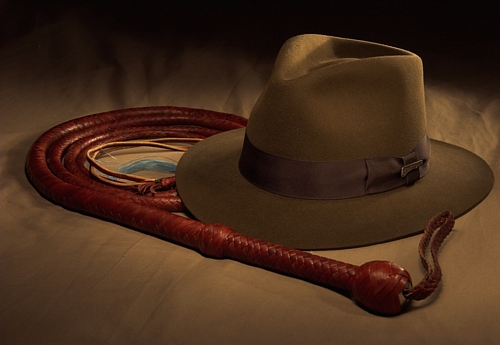
Jones's fedora and bullwhip

The hat became so iconic that the filmmakers could only come up with very good reasons or jokes to remove it. If it ever fell off during a take, filming would have to stop to put it back on. In jest, Ford put a stapler against his head to stop his hat from falling off when a documentary crew visited during shooting of Indiana Jones and the Last Crusade. This created the urban legend that Ford stapled the hat to his head. Anytime Indy's hat accidentally came off as part of the storyline (blown off by the wind, knocked off, etc.) and seemed almost irretrievable, filmmakers would make sure Indy and his beloved hat were always reunited, regardless of the implausibility of its return. Although other hats were also used throughout the films, the general style and profile remained the same. Elements of the outfit include:

- The fedora was supplied by Herbert Johnson Hatters of Savile Row, London for the first three films. An Australian model was used by costume designer Deborah Landis to show hat maker Richard Swales the details when making the iconic hat from "the Poets" parts. The fedora for Crystal Skull was made by Steve Delk and Marc Kitter of the Adventurebilt Hat Company of Columbus, Mississippi.
- The leather jacket, a hybrid of the "Type 440" and the A-2 jacket, was made by Leather Concessionaires (now known as Wested Leather Co.) for Raiders of the Lost Ark and Indiana Jones and the Last Crusade. For Indiana Jones and the Temple of Doom, jackets were made in-house at Bermans & Nathans in London based on a stunt jacket they provided for Raiders of the Lost Ark. Tony Nowak made the jacket for Indiana Jones and the Kingdom of the Crystal Skull.
- The Indiana Jones shirt is based on a typical safari-style shirt. Its distinctive feature is two vertical strips running from the shoulders to the bottom of the shirt tails and continued over both breast pockets. A common debate regards the original shirt color. Surviving samples of the original shirts seem to be darker in reality than they appear on screen. Most fans look for an off-white "stone" color for their replicas. The original shirts, however, may have been more of a "tan" or "natural" color. The shirt varied little from film to film, the only notable difference being the darker buttons in Temple of Doom and Last Crusade. Originally designed by Andreas Dometakis for the films, this shirt was once one of the hardest pieces of gear to find.
- The trousers worn by Indiana Jones in all five films were based on original World War II Army and Army Air Corps officer trousers. Although not original Pinks they are based on the same basic design and do carry a slight pinkish hue. The trousers made for Raiders are said to be more of a greyish-brown whereas the trousers made for Temple of Doom and Last Crusade were supposedly a purer reddish brown. The trousers were made of a khaki wool-twill, pleated with seven belt loops, two scalloped button flap rear pockets, a button fly and a four-inch military style hem. They were all most likely subcontracted by the costume department and made by famed London based cinema costumers, Angels and Bermans, to be tailored perfectly for Harrison Ford for the production.
- The satchel was a modified Mark VII gas mask bag that was used by British troops and civilians during World War II.
- The whip was an 8- to 10-foot (2.4 to 3.0 m) bullwhip crafted by David Morgan for the first three films. The whips for Crystal Skull were crafted by a variety of people, including Terry Jacka, Joe Strain and Morgan (different lengths and styles were likely used in specific stunts).
- The pistol was usually a World War I-era revolver, including the Webley Government (WG) Revolver (Last Crusade and Crystal Skull), or a Smith & Wesson Second Model Hand Ejector revolver (Raiders). He has also used a Colt Official Police revolver (Temple of Doom), a Nagant M1883 (Young Indiana Jones), and a 9 mm Browning Hi-Power (Raiders). The weapon is carried in a military pattern flap holster.
- The shoes were made by Alden. A stock style (model 405) that had been a favorite of Ford's before the films, they are still sold today (though in a redder (brick) shade of brown than seen in the films) and are popularly known as "Indy Boots."

The fedora and leather jacket from Indiana Jones and the Last Crusade are on display at the Smithsonian Institution's National Museum of American History in Washington, D.C. The collecting of props and clothing from the films has become a thriving hobby for some aficionados of the franchise. Jones' whip was the third most popular film weapon, as shown by a 2008 poll held by 20th Century Fox, which surveyed approximately two thousand film fans.

== Casting ==
Originally, Spielberg suggested Harrison Ford; Lucas resisted the idea, since he had already cast the actor in American Graffiti, Star Wars and The Empire Strikes Back, and did not want Ford to become known as his "Bobby De Niro" (in reference to Martin Scorsese frequently casting Robert De Niro in his films). During an intensive casting process, Lucas and Spielberg auditioned many actors, and finally cast actor Tom Selleck as Indiana Jones. Shortly afterward pre-production began in earnest on Raiders of the Lost Ark. CBS refused to release Selleck from his contractual commitment to Magnum, P.I., forcing him to turn down the role. Shooting for the film could have overlapped with the pilot for Magnum, P.I. but it later turned out that filming of the pilot episode was delayed and Selleck could have done both.

Subsequently, Peter Coyote and Tim Matheson both auditioned for the role. After Spielberg suggested Ford again, Lucas relented, and Ford was cast in the role less than three weeks before filming began.

== Cultural influence ==
=== Archaeological influence ===
The industry magazine Archaeology named eight past and present archaeologists who they felt "embodied [Jones's] spirit" as recipients of the Indy Spirit Awards in 2008. That same year Ford himself was elected to the board of directors for the Archaeological Institute of America. Commenting that "understanding the past can only help us in dealing with the present and the future," Ford was praised by the association's president for his character's "significant role in stimulating the public's interest in archaeological exploration."

He is perhaps the most influential character in films that explore archaeology. Since the release of Raiders of the Lost Ark in 1981, the very idea of archaeology and archaeologists has fundamentally shifted. Prior to the film's release, the stereotypical image of an archaeologist was that of an older, lackluster professor type. In the early years of films involving archaeologists, they were portrayed as victims who would need to be rescued by a more masculine or heroic figure. Following 1981, the stereotypical archaeologist was thought of as an adventurer consistently engaged in fieldwork.

Archeologist Anne Pyburn described the influence of Indiana Jones as elitist and sexist, and argued that the film series had caused new discoveries in the field of archaeology to become oversimplified and overhyped in an attempt to gain public interest, which negatively influences archaeology as a whole. Eric Powell, an editor with the magazine Archaeology, said "O.K., fine, the movie romanticizes what we do", and that "Indy may be a horrible archeologist, but he's a great diplomat for archeology. I think we'll see a spike in kids who want to become archeologists". Kevin McGeough, associate professor of archaeology, describes the original archaeological criticism of the film as missing the point of the film: "dramatic interest is what is at issue, and it is unlikely that film will change in order to promote and foster better archaeological techniques".

=== Other characters inspired by Jones ===
While himself an homage to various prior adventurers, aspects of Indiana Jones also directly influenced some subsequent characterizations:

- Lara Croft, the female archaeologist of the Tomb Raider series, was originally designed as a man but was changed to a woman, partly because the developers felt the original design was too similar to Indiana Jones. Paramount Pictures, which distributed the first four installments of the Indiana Jones film series, would later make two films based on the Tomb Raider games.
- Rick O'Connell from The Mummy films has often been compared to the likes of Indiana Jones.
- The producer of the Prince of Persia (2008) video game, Ben Mattes, explained that its "inspiration was anything Harrison Ford has ever done: Indiana Jones, Han Solo."
- Nathan Drake, the protagonist from the video game series Uncharted, shares many similarities with Jones himself, both visually and personality-wise.
- Dr. Smolder Bravestone, the main protagonist's video game avatar in the Jumanji film series, shares similarities to Jones.
- Flynn Carsen, the main character of The Librarian.
- Sydney Fox, the main character of Relic Hunter
- Benjamin Franklin Gates, the main character of the first 2 films in the National Treasure franchise.

=== References in other media ===
Indiana Jones has been widely referenced and parodied throughout different media. Some notable franchises which have referenced Indiana Jones include:

- Star Wars: Indiana Jones has been referenced multiple times, including in Star Wars: The Force Awakens when Han Solo is chased by a spherical rathtar, which uses sound effects from Raiders of the Lost Ark.
- Marvel Cinematic Universe: Has made various references including in the opening scene of Guardians of the Galaxy referencing Raiders.
- The Simpsons: Has made reference to Indiana Jones many times, including Milhouse's uncle, Norbert Van Houten, dressing as the character.
- The Big Bang Theory: Makes numerous references to Indiana Jones, having an episode, "The Raiders Minimization", named in reference to Raiders.
- World of Warcraft: Parodies the character with the non-player character named "Harrison Jones" paraphrasing Jones's lecture from Indiana Jones and the Last Crusade.

=== Psychology ===
In psychology, the behavior of a person's denial of an obviously proven finding against overwhelming evidence and the person's own observations is also referred to as the "Indiana Jones effect". This title refers to Indiana Jones's repeated disbelief of the supernatural seen throughout the series, even though the character has seen magical rituals, the Ark of the Covenant and the Holy Grail with his own eyes.
