= Indiana Jones Epic Stunt Spectacular! =

Amusement show at Walt Disney World

Coordinates: 28°21′23″N 81°33′29″W

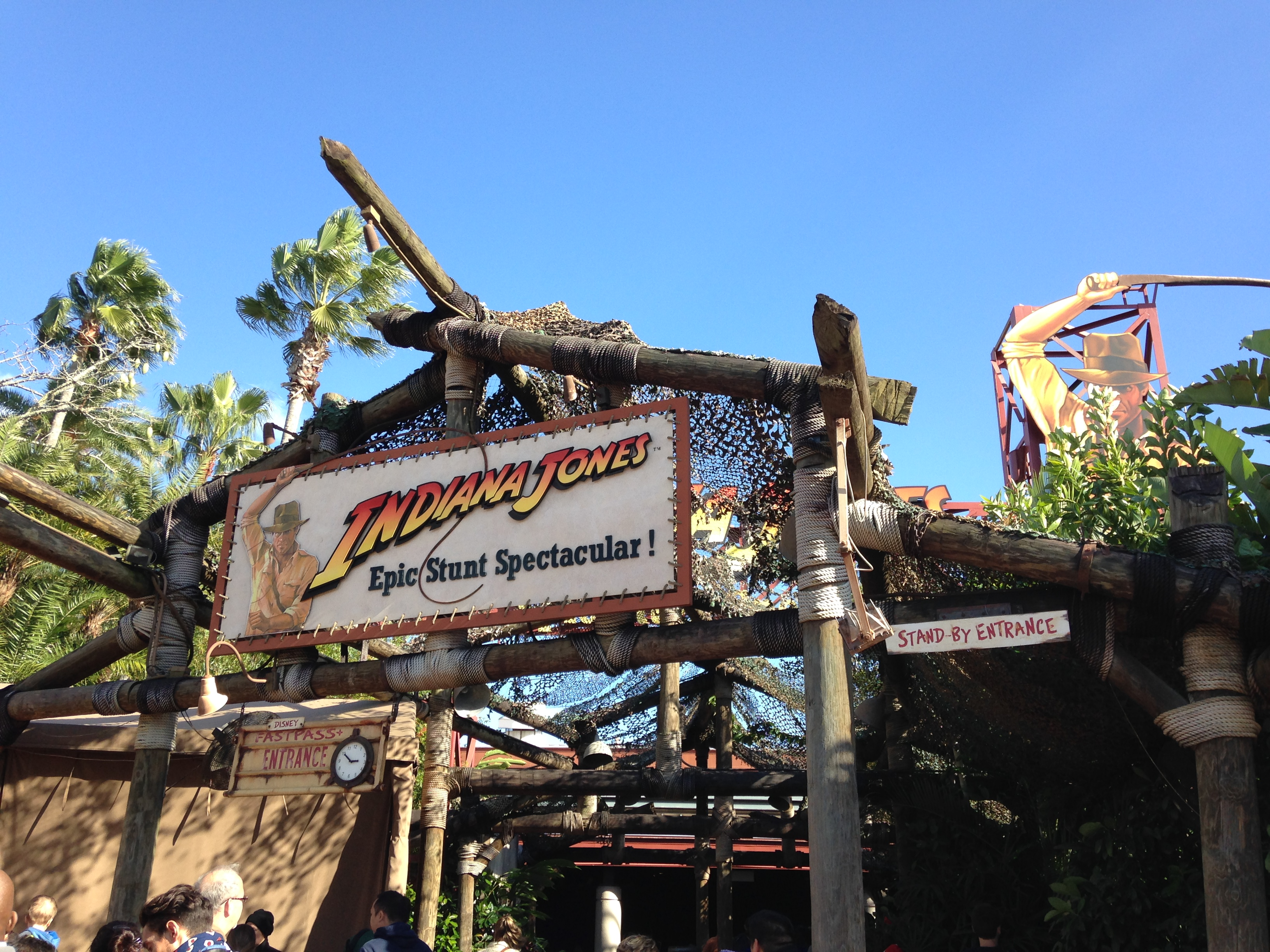

Disney's Hollywood Studios
- Area: Echo Lake
- Status: Operating
- Opening date: August 25, 1989

Ride statistics
- Attraction type: Stunt show
- Designer: Walt Disney Creative Entertainment
- Theme: Raiders of the Lost Ark
- Music: "The Raiders March" and film compositions by John Williams
- Audience capacity: 2,150 per show
- Duration: 25 minutes
- Lightning Lane available
- Wheelchair accessible
- Assistive listening available

Indiana Jones Epic Stunt Spectacular! is a live amusement show at Disney's Hollywood Studios at Walt Disney World in Orlando, Florida that opened on August 25, 1989. Based on the popular and successful Indiana Jones film franchise, it includes various stunts and live reenacted scenes from the series's first film, Raiders of the Lost Ark. It is executive produced by George Lucas and directed by Jerry Rees, with stunt coordination by Glenn Randall.

== History ==
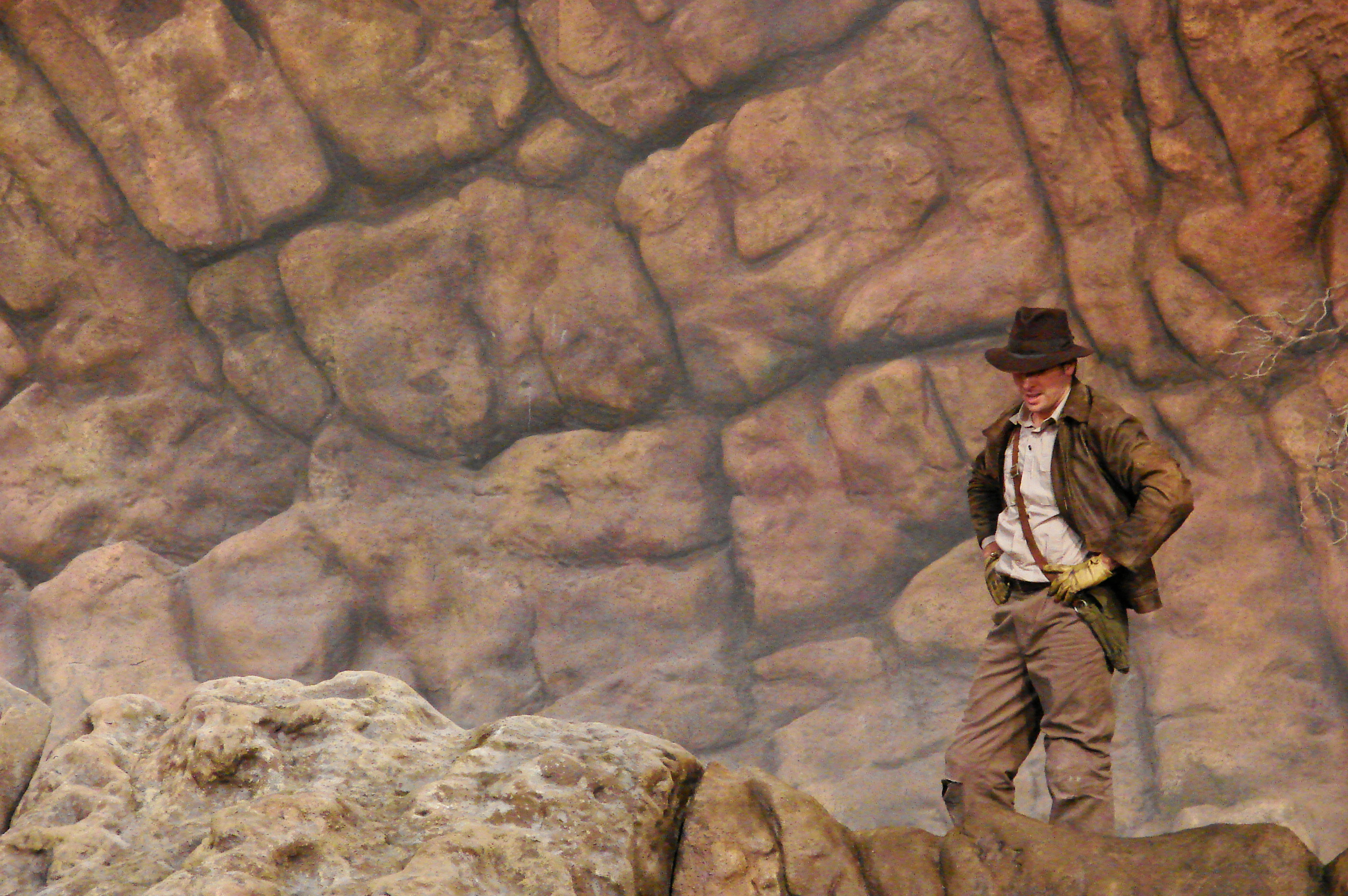
Indiana Jones stunt double performing at the show

The show opened on August 25, 1989, in the Stunt Theater, as the first Indiana Jones attraction at a Disney park, and was put on a six-month hiatus in 2000 for refurbishing.

In 2004, the Nazi swastikas on German trucks, aircraft, and actor uniforms were removed and replaced by a Balkenkreuz.

This is the first theme park attraction to use a computer-based show control system in conjunction with a custom made programmable logic controller system to trigger, control and sequence complex live events in real time, controlled by the actors in many cases. All other effects are triggered by a cast member at the booth. The original control system was based on the Amiga computer with software by Richmond Sound Design Ltd. The show is consistently upgrading its electronics and computer elements to keep it up to date. This began a trend in live stunt shows with both Walt Disney World and Universal Studios opening many more similar attractions over the next eight years.

Indiana Jones Epic Stunt Spectacular! incorporated audience participation as part of the show's entertainment, until 2020; this part was dropped when the show returned to the theme park after the COVID-19 pandemic. Volunteers were chosen from the crowd to perform as townspeople in the Cairo street scene, though they did not perform any stunts themselves and were always placed a safe distance away from the real stunt work and special effects. Among the actual audience volunteers was a stunt performer plant who surprised the audience and other volunteers by gradually revealing their skills during a supposed tutorial session between scenes.

On November 9, 2026, it was announced that a new outdoor playground area called Epic Jr. Stunt Spectacular is coming to the location of Echo Lake at Disney's Hollywood Studios, which is set to open in the coming months, and nearly the location of Epic Theater.

== Show experience ==
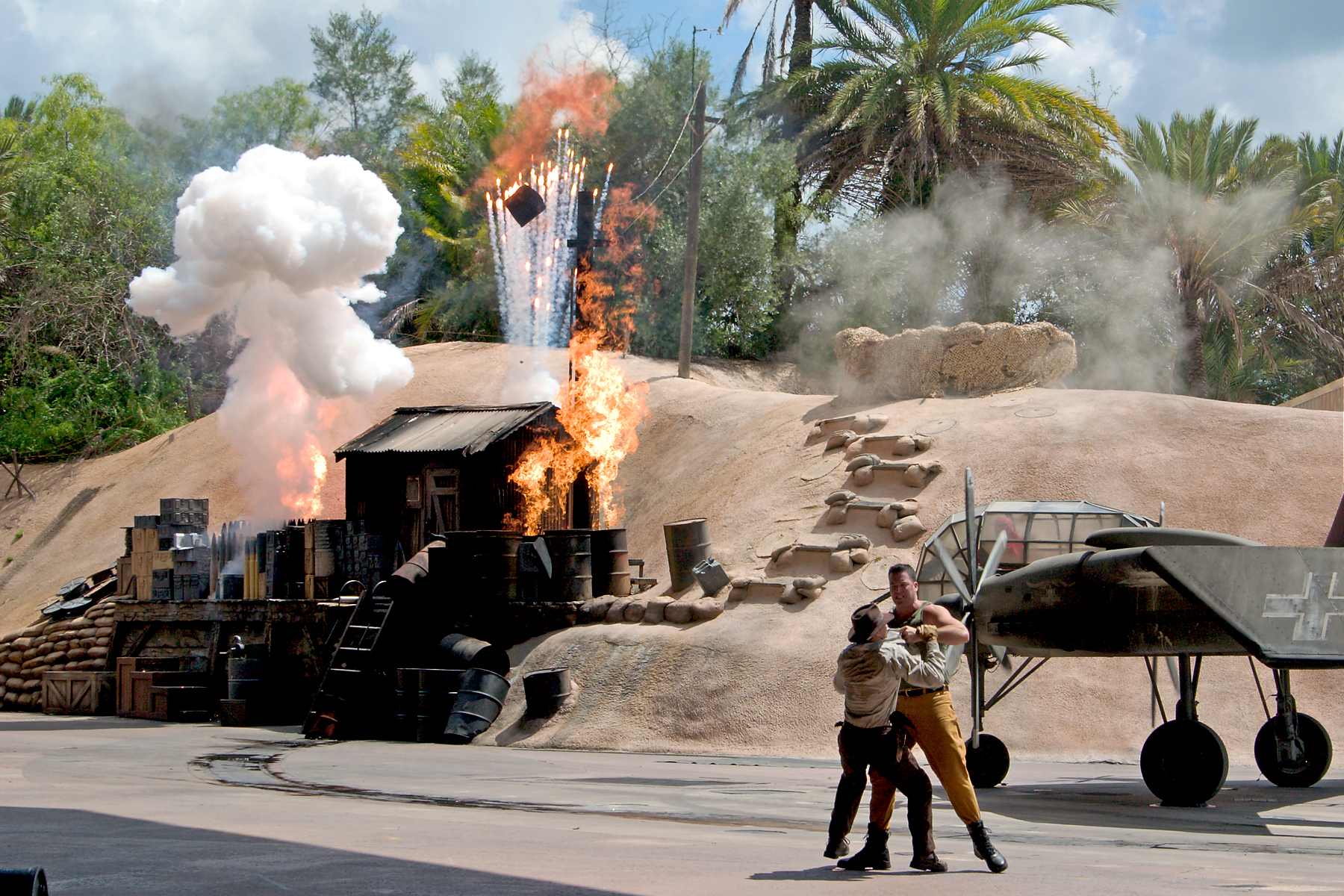
The finale scene from the show.

Indiana Jones Epic Stunt Spectacular! is based on many of the popular stunt scenes from Raiders of the Lost Ark. The show uses various pyrotechnic devices which are incorporated into several of the stunts.

The action starts with Indy braving dangers in a recreation of the Peruvian temple scene from the beginning of the movie. Dangerous spikes, false floors and ancient booby traps test the archaeologist's skills before he attempts to make a getaway with the golden idol. The stunt show then moves on to the busy and audience-participant filled streets of Cairo. Indy and Marion watch street acrobats before events take a turn for the worse and a massive fight scene breaks out. The Cairo street scene concludes with Indy shooting at a Jeep loaded with explosives, producing a fiery conclusion. The final scene of the stunt show recreates the action-packed sequence in which Indy and Marion try to stop the Nazis from flying the Ark to Berlin. The reenactment is complete with a scaled-down version of a German Luftwaffe aircraft with Balkenkreuz (swastikas were used in the show up until the 2000s). Indy fights a large German mechanic while Marion operates the aircraft's machine gun, blowing away enemies in sight. Indy and Marion are able to make a narrow escape as the airfield is engulfed in flames.

== Incidents ==
- In 1990, OSHA fined the park $1,000 after three performers were injured in three separate incidents.
  - In one incident, a performer fell 30 feet (9.14 m) when a restraining cable failed.
  - In another incident, a performer fell 25 feet (7.62 m) when a prop ladder unexpectedly collapsed.
  - A third performer was pinned by a malfunctioning trap door. OSHA cited Disney for failing to provide adequate fall protection, including padding and other equipment.
  - Later, while rehearsing a new, safer routine, another performer fell 25 feet (7.62 m) onto concrete.
- In a rehearsal on August 17, 2009, a 30-year-old performer named Anislav Varbanov died after injuring his head while performing a tumbling roll. The next day's performances were canceled out of respect for him.
- On December 30, 2025, the 400-pound boulder fell off its track and bounced off the stage. A cast member fractured two vertebrae and was cut on the forehead after being struck by the boulder while stopping it from hitting the audience.

== 2020 labor dispute ==
When Walt Disney World reopened in July 2020 following the COVID-19 shutdown, all stage shows such as Finding Nemo – The Musical, Beauty and the Beast: Live on Stage, Festival of the Lion King, and the Indiana Jones Epic Stunt Spectacular! had remained closed due to a dispute between the Actors' Equity Association and Walt Disney World over allowing performers to wear face masks and providing regular testing.
