= Indiana Jones and the Peril at Delphi =

1991 novel by Rob MacGregor

- Author: Rob MacGregor
- Language: English
- Series: Indiana Jones
- Genre: Fantasy, Adventure
- Publisher: Bantam Books
- Publication date: January 1, 1991
- Publication place: United States
- Media type: Print (Paperback)
- Pages: 248 pp
- ISBN: 0-553-28931-4
- Followed by: Indiana Jones and the Dance of the Giants

Indiana Jones and the Peril at Delphi is the first of 12 Indiana Jones novels published by Bantam Books. Rob MacGregor, its author, also wrote five of the other Indiana Jones books for Bantam. It was published January 1, 1991, and was followed by Indiana Jones and the Dance of the Giants.

== Plot summary ==
After a brief flashback to 1920, with a glimpse of Indiana Jones as a college student in Chicago, the novel moves to its main setting.

The year is 1922. Indy is a graduate student in Paris, studying linguistics and Greek archaeology. Although his greater talent currently seems to be for the former, he begins to wonder if he might be better suited for a different career after he receives a surprising invitation from his professor.

Following an archaeology lecture to her class on the Greek city of Delphi, Professor Dorian Belecamus announces that she will be leaving the university for the rest of the semester to return to Delphi to oversee the recovery of an archaeological find, discovered recently in the wake of an earthquake in the region. After class, to Indy's surprise, she privately invites him to join her on the journey as her assistant, telling him that he is her best student and that she feels he could be very helpful on the expedition. After some consideration, Indy decides to accept the offer in the hopes that assisting in such an exciting undertaking may very well lead him to a more intriguing and adventurous career than the world of linguistics may have to offer.

He, of course, has no idea exactly how true those ideas will prove to be as he embarks on a journey filled with mysterious figures, deceptive intentions, and a lot more waiting for him at Delphi than he ever expected.

== Characters ==
- Henry Jones Jr. (a.k.a. Indiana Jones) An American student attending graduate school in Paris. He has vast knowledge in the fields of linguistics and mythology, but after being invited by his professor to help unearth a possibly significant historical find in an ancient Greek temple, he starts to wonder if he might find a career in archaeology to be more his speed.
- Professor Dorian Belecamus A professor of Greek archaeology, teaching in Paris. She is somewhat of an enigma to Indy and becomes even more so when she announces to her class that she will be leaving for the remainder of the semester to return to Delphi on an archaeology expedition and later, privately, invites Mr. Jones to join her.
- Professor Ted Conrad Indy's history Professor and friend from Chicago.
- Jack Shannon Indy's best friend, fellow college classmate and a jazz musician from Chicago.
- Colonel Alexander Mandraki A shadowy figure from Professor Belecamus' past, with whom she is still apparently very close. It appears, early on, that he may somehow be at the center of her primary motives for returning to Delphi.
- Panos A mysterious individual with quite a different take on the recent events in Delphi. He is not pleased at the arrival of foreigners in Delphi, especially Indiana Jones.
- Grigoris Son of Panos. He is his father's right hand as they pursue their goals surrounding the events in Delphi.
- Stephanos Doumas He is the head of archaeology in Delphi and is in charge of the site at the temple until Professor Belecamus arrives.
- Nikos a teenage desk clerk at the Delphi Hotel, as well as the son of the owner. He is fascinated by Indy and the two quickly become friends

== See also ==
- Indiana Jones prequels
