= Instruments of Chaos starring Young Indiana Jones =

1994 video game

- Developers: Brian A. Rice, Inc.
- Publisher: Sega
- Platform: Sega Genesis
- Release: 1994
- Genres: Action, adventure
- Mode: SIngle-player

Instruments of Chaos starring Young Indiana Jones is a 1994 action game developed by Brian A. Rice, Inc. and published by Sega for the Sega Genesis. It is based on the television series, The Young Indiana Jones Chronicles. The game was in development as of August 1992, with the title Young Indiana Jones. A Sega CD version had been planned for release in July 1993, but it was never published.

== Gameplay ==
As a spy during World War I, Indiana Jones is sent around the world to stop German agents from acquiring technology that will strengthen the German war machine.

Playing as Jones, the player travels to India, Egypt, Tibet, and London, with Germany as the final level. The player is equipped with three weapons: a pistol, a whip, and grenades. Weapons can be used by the player to solve action-oriented puzzles throughout the game. Numerous enemies are encountered throughout the game, including guards, construction workers, monks, priests, and various animals. Several items can be used by the player, including crosses, which refill the player's health meter; poison tips, which increase the whip's lethality; and hats, which grant temporary invincibility.

== Reception ==
Reception

Review scores
Publication	Score
AllGame	2/5
Super Game Power	3.3/5
Video Games (DE)	28%
Man!ac	15%
Mega	50%
MegaForce	30%
Sega Pro	39%
Power Unlimited	25/100

Josse Bilson, writing for Mega, opined that the game was too difficult, in part because of an abundance of enemies, but considered the character sprites adequate. Super Game Power complained of slow character movements. The collision detection was also criticized, as were the graphics. Video Games was critical of the sound, and Nick Roberts of Sega Pro disliked the level designs.

Brett Alan Weiss, writing in a later review for AllGame, found the game's "sluggish and unresponsive" controls to be its worst trait, but considered the game's best qualities to be the graphics and sound.
