= Indiana Jones Adventure World =

2011 video game

- The title screen for Indiana Jones Adventure World.
- Developer: Zynga Boston
- Publisher: Zynga
- Platform: Facebook Platform
- Release: September 9, 2011
- Genres: Social, adventure
- Mode: Single-player

Indiana Jones Adventure World is a defunct adventure game for the social network Facebook, released in 2011. It is the first game made by Zynga's Boston development studio, made up of developers from Conduit Labs and Floodgate Entertainment. Adventure World was originally made independent of Indiana Jones, but after Zynga reached a deal with Lucasfilm to bring Indiana Jones to Adventure World, Indiana Jones appeared in off-screen cameo roles. On November 29, Indiana Jones was added to the game in a chapter dedicated to the character called "Calendar of the Sun". At this time, the title was changed to Indiana Jones Adventure World. Hal Barwood, the co-writer and co-designer of Indiana Jones and the Fate of Atlantis and writer and designer of Indiana Jones and the Infernal Machine worked on Indiana Jones Adventure World in the area of narrative design. Game writer Jonathon Myers has provided narrative support in the wake of Hal Barwood's contribution.

Indiana Jones Adventure World was one in a slew of titles shut down by Zynga at the end of 2012 as part of a cost-cutting measure.

== Plot ==
The game is set in 1930s Middle America. The main character is either a male or a female who has just joined the Adventure Society, and sets up a base camp in an effort to explore ancient ruins.

== Gameplay ==
The object of Indiana Jones Adventure World was to achieve goals by exploring maps. One of the maps, "Calendar of the Sun", allowed the player to team up with a non-playable Indiana Jones to search for the mythical object that can control time.

The player depended upon energy, adventure cash, coins, and goals.
