= Indiana Jones and the Seven Veils =

1991 novel by Rob MacGregor

- Author: Rob MacGregor
- Language: English
- Series: Indiana Jones
- Genre: Fantasy, Adventure
- Publisher: Bantam Books
- Publication date: November 1, 1991
- Publication place: United States
- Media type: Print (Paperback)
- Pages: 304 pp
- ISBN: 0-553-29334-6
- Preceded by: Indiana Jones and the Dance of the Giants
- Followed by: Indiana Jones and the Genesis Deluge

Indiana Jones and the Seven Veils is the third of 12 Indiana Jones novels published by Bantam Books. Rob MacGregor, the author of this book, also wrote five of the other Indiana Jones books for Bantam. Published on November 1, 1991, it is preceded by Indiana Jones and the Dance of the Giants and followed by Indiana Jones and the Genesis Deluge.

== Plot summary ==
After barely escaping with his life from an archaeological dig in Tikal, Guatemala, Dr. Henry Jones, Jr makes his way back to New York. There, he learns of the recent discovery of the mysterious writings of the missing British explorer Colonel Percy Fawcett.

Though Colonel Fawcett still remains missing, his rediscovered work tells a story that could drastically change history and challenge several firmly held scientific beliefs. Within those pages, an incredible picture begins to take shape of a long lost city in the jungles of Brazil and the apparently true legend of a red-headed race, possibly descended from ancient Celtic Druids.

Fascinated by such a prospect, and with the lovely Deidre Campbell at his side, Indiana Jones sets out for the Amazon. However, as usual, getting there will prove to be the true adventure. And if he does manage to survive the journey, who can tell what dangers await within the mythical city itself.

== Characters ==
- Dr. Henry Jones Jr. / Indiana Jones
- Deirdre Campbell
- Marcus Brody
- Victor Bernard
- Percy Fawcett
- Larry Fletcher
- Brenda Hilliard
- Amergin
- Merlin
- Rae-La

== See also ==
- Indiana Jones (Prequels) - Bantam Books
