= Indiana Jones and the Dance of the Giants =

1991 novel by Rob MacGregor

- Author: Rob MacGregor
- Language: English
- Series: Indiana Jones
- Genre: Fantasy, Adventure
- Publisher: Bantam Books
- Publication date: May 1, 1991
- Publication place: United States
- Media type: Print (Paperback)
- Pages: 230 pp (first edition)
- ISBN: 0-553-29035-5
- Preceded by: Indiana Jones and the Peril at Delphi
- Followed by: Indiana Jones and the Seven Veils

Indiana Jones and the Dance of the Giants is the second of 12 Indiana Jones novels published by Bantam Books. Rob MacGregor, the author of this book, also wrote five of the other Indiana Jones books for Bantam. Published on May 1, 1991, it is preceded by Indiana Jones and the Peril at Delphi and followed by Indiana Jones and the Seven Veils.

== Plot summary ==
The year is 1925, and Dr. Henry Jones Jr., better known as Indiana Jones, has secured his first teaching job as an archaeology professor at London University. It is here that Indy meets a very attractive 20-year-old Scottish girl, Deirdre Campbell. She is the brightest student in his class, but Indy quickly learns that her knowledge goes far beyond the contents of his lectures.

In her thesis, she seriously claims to have uncovered a golden scroll that proves the true existence of Merlin the sorcerer. Intrigued by the thesis and by Deirdre, Indy once again takes up the bullwhip and fedora for an action-packed chase across Britain filled with magic, mystery, murder, a lesson in love and the threat of world domination.

== Characters ==
- Dr. Henry Jones Jr. (a.k.a. Indiana Jones) professor and archaeologist.
- Deirdre Campbell Indy's student and the daughter of Dr. Joanna Campbell.
- Dr. Joanna Campbell mother of Deirdre Campbell and Indy's boss who invites him on the dig.
- Jack Shannon Indy's best friend and roommate, a jazz musician.
- Dr. Milford an eccentric old friend to Indy's father and Marcus Brody, who likes to randomly speak Middle English. He is sent by Brody to tell Indy that Omphalos was stolen, but, because of his memory problems, he keeps forgetting what he was supposed to tell him.
- Adrian Powell a Member of Parliament, and former associate of both Deidre and Joanna Campbell, who is carrying out a hidden agenda which has almost claimed Indy's life on more than one occasion.
- Father Byrne a Catholic priest from Whithorn who has known the Campbell family since before Deidre was born.
- Carl and Richard two brothers, both carpenters and members of the Scottish Amateur Archaeology League hired by Dr. Campbell to assist in the excavation of St. Ninian's Cave, near Whithorn Isle, Scotland.

== See also ==
- Indiana Jones (Prequels) - Bantam Books
