= George Hall (actor) =

Canadian actor (1916–2002)

- George Hall as Old Indiana Jones
- Born: November 19, 1916; Toronto, Ontario, Canada
- Died: October 21, 2002 (aged 85); Hawthorne, New York, U.S.
- Occupation: Actor
- Years active: 1944–2002

George Hall (November 19, 1916 – October 21, 2002) was a Canadian theatre, television, and film actor. He had an over 50-year career as a Broadway character actor, making his Broadway debut in 1946 and working steadily in New York theatrical productions for decades thereafter. He was a graduate of the Neighborhood Playhouse School of the Theatre, attending 1938–1939. Outside of the theatre, he is probably best remembered for his role as the 93-year-old Indiana Jones in the TV series The Young Indiana Jones Chronicles (1992). He also played Ernie Tuttle #2 and John the butler on the television soap opera The Edge of Night and the addled but kind-hearted Mr. Eldridge in the AMC series Remember WENN, which aired in the mid-1990s.

He was married to Cordelia Ware, also an actor on Broadway, until her death in 1969.

== Death ==
Hall, a working actor at 85, died on October 21, 2002, of complications from a stroke. He had just finished a run on Broadway playing the role of The Sorcerer in The Boys from Syracuse, which had concluded its run the previous day (October 20).

== Filmography ==
Year	Title	Role	Notes
1944	A Canterbury Tale	Police Superintendent in Mayoral Procession Entering Cathedral	Film debut, Uncredited
1957	Cinderella	The King's Steward	TV movie, Uncredited
1984	Tales of the Unexpected	George	Episode: The Gift of Beauty
1987	From the Hip	Harvey Beals	
1988	Johnny Be Good	Grandpa Walker	
1992–1993	The Young Indiana Jones Chronicles	Old Indy	Regular character
1993	Scarlet and Black	Abbé Charles	Miniseries
1996	Samson and Delilah	Anziano	Miniseries
1997	Mrs. Brown	Speaker of the House	
1999	Big Daddy	Elderly Driver	Final film role
2002	Courage the Cowardly Dog	Cruel Veterinarian	Final TV role
