= Boban =

Boban (Serbian Cyrillic: Бобан) is a Croatian family name and Serbian, Montenegrin and Macedonian masculine given name. Among Serbs, Montenegrins and Macedonians, Boban might be used as a nickname form of the name "Slobodan" or "Bogdan".

== People ==
=== Surname ===
- Ana Boban (born 1947), Croatian swimmer who competed for Yugoslavia at 1968 Olympics
- Blaženko Boban (born 1960), Croatian politician
- Bruno Boban (1992–2018), Croatian footballer
- Eugène Boban (1834–1908), French antiquarian who sold the first crystal skulls to museum collections in the late 19th century
- Ervin Boban (born 1965), Croatian footballer
- Gabrijel Boban (born 1989), Croatian footballer
- Gordana Boban (born 1967), actress from Bosnia and Herzegovina
- Kunchacko Boban (born 1976), Indian film actor
- Ljubo Boban (1933–1994), Croatian historian
- Mate Boban (1940–1997), Bosnian-Herzegovian politician
- Rafael Boban (1907–1945?), Croatian Ustaše officer
- Tonči Boban (born 1971), Croatian footballer
- Zvonimir Boban (born 1968), Croatian footballer

=== Given name ===
- Boban Alummoodan, Indian actor
- Boban Apostolov (born 1984), Macedonian musical artist
- Boban Babunski (born 1968), Yugoslav/Macedonian footballer
- Boban Bajković (born 1985), Montenegrin footballer
- Boban Birmančević (born 1969), Serbian politician
- Boban Bogosavljević (born 1988), Serbian chess grandmaster
- Boban Božović (born 1963), Bosnian footballer
- Boban Cenić (born 1991), Serbian footballer
- Boban Đerić (born 1993), Bosnian footballer
- Boban Dmitrović (born 1972), Serbian footballer
- Boban Georgiev (born 1997), Macedonian footballer
- Boban Grnčarov (born 1982), Macedonian footballer
- Boban Ilić (born 1963), Serbian sculptor
- Boban Jančevski (born 1978), Macedonian footballer
- Boban Janković (1963–2006), Serbian basketball player
- Boban Jović (born 1991), Slovenian footballer
- Boban Kajgo (born 1989), Canadian soccer player of Serbian origin
- Boban Knežević (born 1959), Serbian writer
- Boban Lazić (born 1994), Bosnian footballer
- Boban Maksimović (born 1985), Swiss footballer of Serbian descent
- Boban Marjanović (born 1988), Serbian basketball player
- Boban Marković (born 1964), Serbian trumpet player of Romani background
- Boban Mitev (born 1972), Macedonian basketball coach
- Boban Nikolić (born 1980), Serbian football player
- Boban Nikolov (born 1994), Macedonian football player
- Boban Nikolovski (born 1977), Macedonian football player
- Boban Petrović (1957–2021), Serbian basketball player
- Boban Rajović (born 1971), Montenegrin pop singer
- Boban Ranković (born 1979), Serbian rower
- Boban Samuel, Indian film director
- Boban Savović (born 1979), Montenegrin basketball player
- Boban Stajić (born 1993), Macedonian basketball player
- Boban Stojanović (born 1978), Serbian activist
- Boban Stojanović (footballer) (born 1979), Serbian football player
- Boban Tomić (born 1988), Slovenian basketball player
- Boban Vasov (born 1986), Serbian football player
- Boban Zirintusa (born 1992), Ugandan football player

== See also ==
- Boban (album), an album by Boban Rajović
- Boban, an Indian comic character
