= Najbolje do sada =

Najbolje do sada may refer to:

- Najbolje do sada (Boban Rajović album), 2009
- Najbolje do sada... (Šako Polumenta album), 2005
