= Birmančević =

Birmančević (Serbian Cyrillic: Бирманчевић) is a Serbian surname. Notable people with the surname include:

- Boban Birmančević (born 1969), Serbian politician
- Veljko Birmančević (born 1998), Serbian footballer
