= Kosači =

Studio album by Boban Rajović
- Released: late-spring 2008
- Genre: Pop
- Label: Sound Production

Boban Rajović chronology
Usne boje vina (2007)	Kosači (2008)	Najbolje do sada (2009)

Kosači (English translation: Mowers) is the fifth studio album by Montenegrin singer Boban Rajović. It was released in late spring 2008.

== Track listing ==
Main songs

1. Crna lala (Black Tulip)
2. Kosači (Mowers)
3. Pomozite mi drugovi (Help Me, Friends)
4. Latice od ruža (Rose Petals)
5. Da li, da li je? (Is It, Is It)
6. Broj 23 (Number 23)
7. Izdaja (Betrayal)
8. Pola sata do Beograda (Half an Hour to Belgrade)
9. Autoput (Highway)
10. Ljubav (Love)
11. Bata

Bonus tracks

1. Usne boje vina (Lips the Color of Wine)
2. Ubi me ti (You Killed Me)
3. Provokacija (Provocation)
4. Na dan kad si rođena (On the Day You Were Born)
5. Puklo srce (My Heart Exploded)
6. Flaša (Bottle)
7. Koga foliraš (Who Are You Fooling)
