= Indiana Jones and the Kingdom of the Crystal Skull =

2008 film directed by Steven Spielberg

- Theatrical release poster by Drew Struzan
- Directed by: Steven Spielberg
- Screenplay by: David Koepp
- Story by: George Lucas; Jeff Nathanson
- Based on: Characters by: George Lucas; Philip Kaufman
- Produced by: Frank Marshall
- Starring: Harrison Ford; Cate Blanchett; Karen Allen; Ray Winstone; John Hurt; Jim Broadbent; Shia LaBeouf
- Cinematography: Janusz Kamiński
- Edited by: Michael Kahn
- Music by: John Williams
- Production company: Lucasfilm Ltd.
- Distributed by: Paramount Pictures
- Release dates: May 18, 2008 (Cannes); May 22, 2008 (United States)
- Running time: 122 minutes
- Country: United States
- Language: English
- Budget: $185 million
- Box office: $787 million

Indiana Jones and the Kingdom of the Crystal Skull is a 2008 American action adventure film directed by Steven Spielberg, and written by David Koepp. It is the fourth installment in the Indiana Jones film series and a sequel to Indiana Jones and the Last Crusade (1989). Set in 1957, it pits Indiana Jones (Harrison Ford) against Soviet KGB agents led by Irina Spalko (Cate Blanchett) searching for a telepathic crystal skull located in Peru. Jones is aided by his former lover, Marion Ravenwood (Karen Allen), and their son, Mutt Williams (Shia LaBeouf). The supporting cast includes Ray Winstone, John Hurt, and Jim Broadbent.

Jeb Stuart, Jeffrey Boam, Frank Darabont, Lucas, and Nathanson wrote drafts before Koepp's script satisfied the producers. The filmmakers intended to pay tribute to the science fiction B movies in the 1950s. Shooting began on June 18, 2007, at various locations in New Mexico, New Haven, Connecticut, Hawaii, and Fresno, California, as well as on sound stages in Los Angeles. To maintain aesthetic continuity with the previous films, the crew relied on traditional stunt work instead of computer-generated stunt doubles, and cinematographer Janusz Kamiński studied Douglas Slocombe's style from the previous films.

Indiana Jones and the Kingdom of the Crystal Skull had its premiere at the 61st Cannes Film Festival on May 18, 2008, and was released in the United States on May 22, by Paramount Pictures. It received generally positive reviews from critics and was a financial success, grossing $786.6 million and becoming the second-highest-grossing film of 2008. A sequel, Indiana Jones and the Dial of Destiny, was released in 2023.

== Plot ==
In 1957, Soviet agents led by Colonel Doctor Irina Spalko kidnap American archeologist Indiana Jones and his partner George "Mac" McHale. They infiltrate Hangar 51 in Nevada and use Jones to locate a mummified alien from the Roswell incident. Jones locates the mummy before being double-crossed by Mac, but escapes to a nearby model town at the Nevada Test Site, minutes before an atomic bomb test. He survives the blast in a lead-lined refrigerator in one of the town's mock houses before being rescued and interrogated by the FBI.

Returning to Marshall College, Jones discovers he has been placed on an indefinite leave of absence. Mutt Williams, a young greaser, approaches Jones and informs him that his former colleague, Harold "Ox" Oxley, found a crystal skull in Peru in search of the mythical city Akator. KGB agents attempt to capture them, but the two escape, during which they instigate a brawl between the greasers and jocks and lose them during the chase through the College Campus District. The duo later travels to Peru.

In Peru, they find carvings made by Ox, which lead the pair to the grave of Francisco de Orellana, which contains an elongated crystal skull. Leaving the grave, they are captured by the Soviets and taken to a camp in the Amazon rainforest. They are reunited with Mac, Spalko, an addled Ox, and Mutt's mother, Marion Ravenwood. Spalko tells Jones that the skulls are alien in origin and that she intends to use them to project Soviet propaganda into the minds of Americans. Jones has a brief telepathic connection to the skull, which commands him to return it to Akator. He realizes that Ox is attempting to communicate through automatic writing, discovering a route to the city. They first attempt an escape until Indy and Marion get caught in quicksand, during which Marion reveals that Mutt is Indy's son. Mutt manages to save them, but they are recaptured by the Soviets.

While en route to Akator, Jones retakes the skull from the Soviet troops and escapes from them alongside Marion, Ox, Mutt and Mac, who claims to be a double agent, all the while leaving a trail for Spalko. Jones and his companions locate Akator, where they learn that the skull belonged to one of thirteen "interdimensional beings" whom the early Ugha tribes worshipped as deities.

Spalko catches up and returns the skull to its skeleton, which comes to life and offers her the reward of omniscience. As an interdimensional portal opens above the chamber, abducting Mac and Spalko's remaining soldiers, the skeletons combine into a reanimated alien, who transfers an overwhelming amount of knowledge into Spalko's mind, vaporizing her.

Jones, Ox, Marion and Mutt escape the crumbling city as a flying saucer rises from the ruins and departs for another dimension. As Ox regains his sanity, Jones and his party return to the United States, where he is reinstated at Marshall College and promoted to associate dean, and marries Marion.

== Cast ==
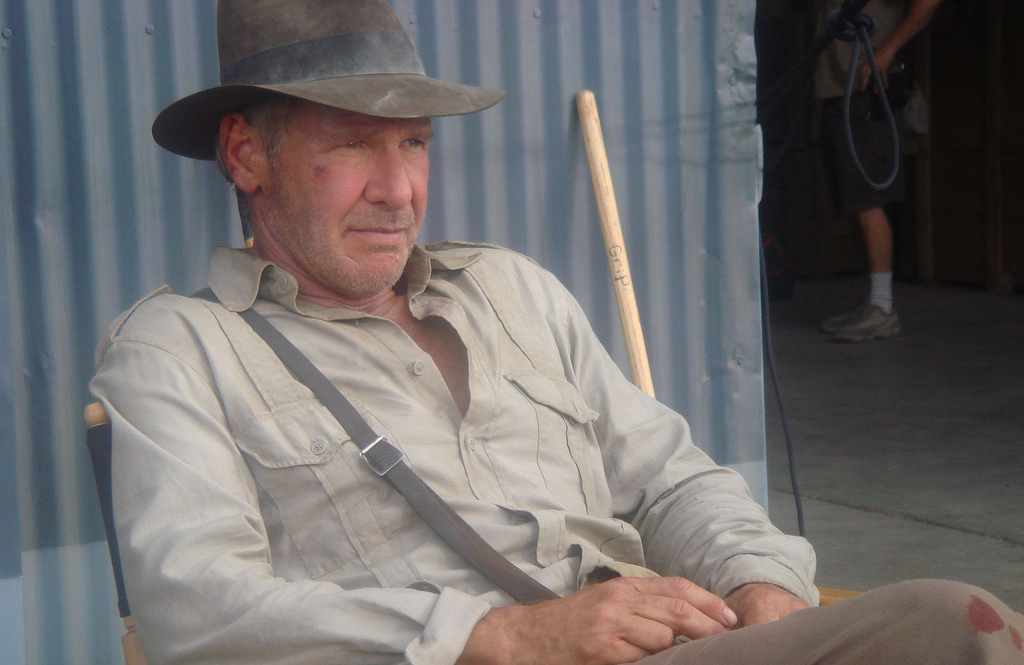
Harrison Ford during the filming of the movie

- Harrison Ford as Indiana Jones. To prepare for the role, the 64-year-old Ford spent three hours a day at a gym, practiced with the bullwhip for two weeks, and relied on a high-protein diet of fish and vegetables. Ford had kept fit during the series' hiatus anyway, as he hoped for another film. He performed many of his own stunts because stunt technology had become safer since 1989, and he also felt it improved his performance. Ford felt his return would also help American culture be less paranoid about aging (he refused to dye his hair for the role), because of the film's family appeal: "This is a movie which is geared not to [the young] segment of the demographic, an age-defined segment [...] We've got a great shot at breaking the movie demographic constraints." He told Koepp to add more references to his age in the script. Spielberg said Ford was not too old to play Indiana: "When a guy gets to be that age and he still packs the same punch, and he still runs just as fast and climbs just as high, he's gonna be breathing a little heavier at the end of the set piece. And I felt, 'Let's have some fun with that. Let's not hide that.'" Spielberg recalled the line in Raiders, "It's not the years, it's the mileage," and felt he could not tell the difference between Ford during the shoots for The Last Crusade and Kingdom of the Crystal Skull.
- Cate Blanchett as Irina Spalko, the Soviet agent who is the main antagonist of the film. Screenwriter David Koepp created the character. Frank Marshall said Irina continued the tradition of Indiana having a love-hate relationship "with every woman he ever comes in contact with". Blanchett had wanted to play a villain for a "couple of years", and enjoyed being part of the Indiana Jones legacy as she loved the previous films. Spielberg praised Blanchett as a "master of disguise", and considers her his favorite Indiana Jones villain for coming up with much of Irina's characteristics. Irina's bob cut was her idea, with the character's stern looks and behavior recalling Rosa Klebb in From Russia with Love. Blanchett learned to fence for the character, but during filming, Spielberg decided to give Irina "karate chop" skills. LaBeouf recalled Blanchett was elusive on set, and Ford was surprised when he met her on set outside of costume. He noted, "There's no aspect of her behavior that was not consistent with this bizarre person she's playing."
- Karen Allen as Marion Ravenwood (under the married name of Marion Williams). Frank Darabont's script introduced the idea of Marion Ravenwood returning as Indy's love interest. Allen was not aware her character was in the script until Spielberg called her in January 2007, saying, "It's been announced! We're gonna make Indiana Jones 4! And guess what? You're in it!" Ford found Allen "one of the easiest people to work with [he's] ever known. She's a completely self-sufficient woman, and that's part of the character she plays. A lot of her charm and the charm of the character is there. And again, it's not an age-dependent thing. It has to do with her spirit and her nature." Allen found Ford easier to work with on this film, in contrast to the first film, where she slowly befriended the private actor.
- Ray Winstone as George "Mac" McHale, an English agent whom Indy worked alongside in World War II, but has now allied with the Russians due to his financial problems. The character acts as a spin on Sallah and René Belloq – Indy's friend and nemesis, respectively, in Raiders of the Lost Ark. Spielberg cast Winstone as he found him "one of the most brilliant actors around", having seen Sexy Beast. Winstone tore his hamstring during filming. "I keep getting these action parts as I'm getting older," he remarked. Like John Hurt, Winstone wished to see the script prior to committing to the film. In interviews on British TV Winstone explained that he was only able to read the script if it was delivered by courier, who waited while he read the script, and returned to the US with the script once Winstone had read it. His reasoning for wanting to read the script was, "If I'm gonna be in it, I want to be in it." He gave suggestions to Spielberg, including the idea of Mac pretending to be a double agent. He also stated that once filming was completed he had to return the script, such was the secrecy about the film. He was later presented with a copy of the script to keep.
- John Hurt as Harold 'Ox' Oxley, Mutt's surrogate father and an old friend of Indiana, whom he lost contact with in 1937. Six months prior to the events of the film, he went insane after discovering the crystal skull, which commanded him to return it to Akator. Frank Darabont had suggested Hurt when he was writing the screenplay. The character is inspired by Ben Gunn from Treasure Island. Hurt wanted to read the script before signing on, unlike other cast members who came on "because Steven—you know, 'God'—was doing it. And I said, 'Well, I need to have a little bit of previous knowledge even if God is doing it.' So they sent a courier over with the script from Los Angeles, gave it to me at three o'clock in the afternoon in London, collected it again at eight o'clock in the evening, and he returned the next day to Los Angeles."
- Jim Broadbent as Dean Charlie Stanforth, Dean of Marshall College and friend of Indy. Broadbent's character stands in for Marcus Brody, as actor Denholm Elliott had died in 1992. As a tribute to Elliott, the filmmakers put a portrait and a statue on the Marshall College location, and a picture on Indy's desk, saying he died shortly after Henry.
- Shia LaBeouf as Mutt Williams/Henry Jones III, a young, motorcycle-riding greaser and Indy's sidekick and son. The concept of Indiana Jones having offspring was introduced in The Young Indiana Jones Chronicles, in which Old Indy is shown to have a daughter. During development of Kingdom of the Crystal Skull, this idea was incorporated into Frank Darabont's script, with Indiana and Marion having a 13-year-old daughter. However, Spielberg found this too similar to The Lost World: Jurassic Park, so a son was created instead. Koepp credited the character's creation to Jeff Nathanson and Lucas. Koepp wanted to make Mutt into a nerd, but Lucas refused, explaining he had to resemble Marlon Brando in The Wild One; "he needs to be what Indiana Jones's father thought of [him]—the curse returns in the form of his own son—he's everything a father can't stand". LaBeouf was Spielberg's first choice for the role, having been impressed by his performance in Holes. Excited at the prospect of being in an Indiana Jones film, LaBeouf signed on without reading the script and did not know what character he would play. He worked out and gained 15 pounds (7 kg) of muscle for the role, and also repeatedly watched the other films to get into character. LaBeouf also watched Blackboard Jungle, Rebel Without a Cause and The Wild One to get into his character's mindset, copying mannerisms and words from characters in those films, such as the use of a switchblade as a weapon. Lucas also consulted on the greaser look, joking that LaBeouf was "sent to the American Graffiti school of greaserland". LaBeouf pulled his rotator cuff when filming his duel with Spalko, which was his first injury in his career, an injury which worsened throughout filming. He later pulled his groin.

Additionally, Igor Jijikine portrays Russian Colonel Antonin Dovchenko, Spalko's second-in-command. His character stands in for the heavily built henchmen that Pat Roach played in the three previous films, as Roach died in 2004 from throat cancer. Joel Stoffer and Neil Flynn have minor roles as FBI agents Taylor and Paul Smith interrogating Indiana in a scene following the opening sequence. Alan Dale plays General Ross, who protests Indiana's innocence. Andrew Divoff and Pasha D. Lychnikoff play Soviet agents Grant and Roosevelt, respectively. Spielberg cast Russian-speaking actors so their accents would be authentic. Ilia Volok and Dimitri Diatchenko play Russian Suit and Spalko's right-hand man Dimitri who battle Indiana at Marshall College. Diatchenko bulked up to 250 pounds to look menacing, and his role was originally minor with 10 days of filming. When shooting the fight, Ford accidentally hit his chin, and Spielberg liked Diatchenko's humorous looking reaction, so he expanded his role to three months of filming. Ernie Reyes Jr. plays a cemetery guard. Chet Hanks plays Student in Library.

Sean Connery turned down an offer to cameo as Henry Jones Sr., as he found retirement too enjoyable. Lucas stated that in hindsight it was good that Connery did not briefly appear, as it would disappoint the audience when his character would not join the film's adventure. Ford joked, "I'm old enough to play my own father in this one." Connery later admitted that his true reason for turning the part down was that it was too small, stating: "It was not that generous a part, worth getting back into the harness and go for. And they had taken the story in a different line anyway, so the father of Indy was kind of really not that important. I had suggested they kill him in the movie, it would have taken care of it better." The film addresses Connery's absence by Indiana implying that both Henry Sr. and Marcus Brody (played in the previous films by Denholm Elliott, who died in 1992) died before the film's events, and briefly shows Connery as Henry Jones Sr. in a picture in Indiana Jones's office. Connery later stated that he liked the film, praising it as "rather good" but also "rather long." Michael Sheard, who portrayed Adolf Hitler in the third film, expressed interest in appearing in the film, but he died in August 2005.

John Rhys-Davies was asked to reprise his role as Sallah as a guest in the wedding scene. He turned it down as he felt his character deserved a more substantial role.

== Production ==
=== Development ===
In 1979, George Lucas and Steven Spielberg made a deal with Paramount Pictures for five Indiana Jones films. Following the release of Indiana Jones and the Last Crusade (1989), Lucas let the series end as he felt he could not think of a good plot device to drive the next installment. He chose instead to produce the prequel television series The Young Indiana Jones Chronicles. The following year, Harrison Ford would express his feelings that, while he was uncertain on if the Indiana Jones character had been fully explored or not, he had the impression that Last Crusade would be the final Indiana Jones film and that, as much he enjoyed playing Jones, he felt that a trilogy was enough, though he wouldn't rule out working with Lucas and Spielberg again. Comic book writer Lee Marrs claimed in a 2023 interview with the IndyCast podcast that Lucasfilm Ltd. was considering making a continuation to the film series by bringing River Phoenix back as a younger Indy, hence why Dark Horse Comics hoped to keep running their Indiana Jones comic book line, though Phoenix's death in 1993 put an end to such possibility.

As Young Indy aired, Ford played Jones in one episode, narrating his adventures in 1920 Chicago from 1950 Wyoming. When Lucas shot Ford's role in December 1992, he realized the scene opened up the possibility of a film with an older Indiana set in the 1950s. The film could reflect a science fiction 1950s B-movie, with aliens as the plot device. Just like how the 1930s Saturday matinée serials inspired the first three Indiana Jones films as well as Star Wars (1977), Lucas felt that B-movies such as The Thing from Another World (1951), It Came from Outer Space (1953) and Them! (1954) could give them a whole new film genre to play with and add a new texture to the story, giving him the idea of using extraterrestrials. Meanwhile, Spielberg believed he was going to mature as a filmmaker after making the trilogy and felt his role in any future installments would be relegated to that of mere producer. Ford told Lucas, "No way am I being in a Steven Spielberg movie like that". Spielberg himself, who depicted aliens in Close Encounters of the Third Kind (1977) and E.T. the Extra-Terrestrial (1982), resisted it.

Perceiving that Ford and Spielberg opined that the film was too much an obvious Lucas-Spielbergian idea, Lucas personally felt that Ford and Spielberg didn't fully understand the franchise's malleability; instead of doing the exact same movie all the time, all they had to do was to test different genres with each installment and it wouldn't stop being an adventure of the title character looking after some artifact as long it were a believable MacGuffin with an archaeological or historical background. He came up with a story, which Jeb Stuart turned into a script from October 1993 to May 1994. (Stuart had previously written 1993's The Fugitive, which starred Ford.) Lucas wanted Indiana to get married, which would allow Henry Jones Sr. to return, expressing concern over whether his son is happy with what he has accomplished. After he learned that Joseph Stalin was interested in psychic warfare, he decided to have Soviets as the villains and the aliens to have psychic powers. Following Stuart's next draft, Lucas hired Last Crusade writer Jeffrey Boam to write the next three versions, the last of which was completed in March 1996. Three months later, Independence Day was released, and Spielberg told Lucas he would not make another alien invasion film. Lucas decided to focus on the Star Wars prequels.

In a 2000 interview, Spielberg said that his children constantly asked when he would make the next Indiana Jones film, and that the project would soon be revived. The same year, Ford, Lucas, Spielberg, Frank Marshall and Kathleen Kennedy met during the American Film Institute's tribute to Ford, and decided they wanted to enjoy the experience of making an Indiana Jones film again. Spielberg also found returning to the series a respite from his many dark films during this period, such as A.I. Artificial Intelligence (2001), Minority Report (2002), and Munich (2005). Lucas convinced Spielberg to use aliens in the plot by saying they were not "extraterrestrials", but "interdimensional", with this concept taking inspiration in the superstring theory. Spielberg and Lucas discussed the central idea of a B-movie involving aliens, and Lucas suggested using the crystal skulls to ground the idea. Lucas found those artifacts as fascinating as the Ark of the Covenant, and had intended to feature them for a Young Indiana Jones episode before the show's cancellation. M. Night Shyamalan was hired to write for an intended 2002 shoot, but he was overwhelmed writing a sequel to a film he loved like Raiders of the Lost Ark (1981), and claimed it was difficult to get Ford, Spielberg and Lucas to focus. Stephen Gaghan and Tom Stoppard were also approached.

Frank Darabont, who wrote various Young Indiana Jones episodes, was hired to write in May 2002. His script, entitled Indiana Jones and the City of Gods, was set in the 1950s, with ex-Nazis pursuing Jones. Spielberg conceived the idea because of real life figures such as Juan Perón in Argentina, who protected Nazi war criminals. Darabont claimed Spielberg loved the script, but Lucas had issues with it, and decided to take over writing himself. Lucas and Spielberg acknowledged the 1950s setting could not ignore the Cold War, and the Soviets were more plausible villains. Spielberg decided he could not satirize the Nazis after directing Schindler's List (1993), while Ford noted, "We plum[b] wore the Nazis out".

Jeff Nathanson met with Spielberg and Lucas in August 2004 and turned in the next drafts in October and November 2005, titled The Atomic Ants. David Koepp continued on from there, giving his script the subtitle Destroyer of Worlds, based on the J. Robert Oppenheimer quote. It was changed to Kingdom of the Crystal Skull, as Spielberg found it more inviting a title and actually named the plot device of the crystal skulls. Lucas insisted on the Kingdom part. Koepp's "bright [title] idea" was Indiana Jones and the Son of Indiana Jones, and Spielberg had also considered having the title name the aliens as The Mysterians (1957), but dropped that when he remembered that was another film's title. Koepp collaborated with Raiders of the Lost Ark screenwriter Lawrence Kasdan on the film's "love dialogue".

=== Filming ===
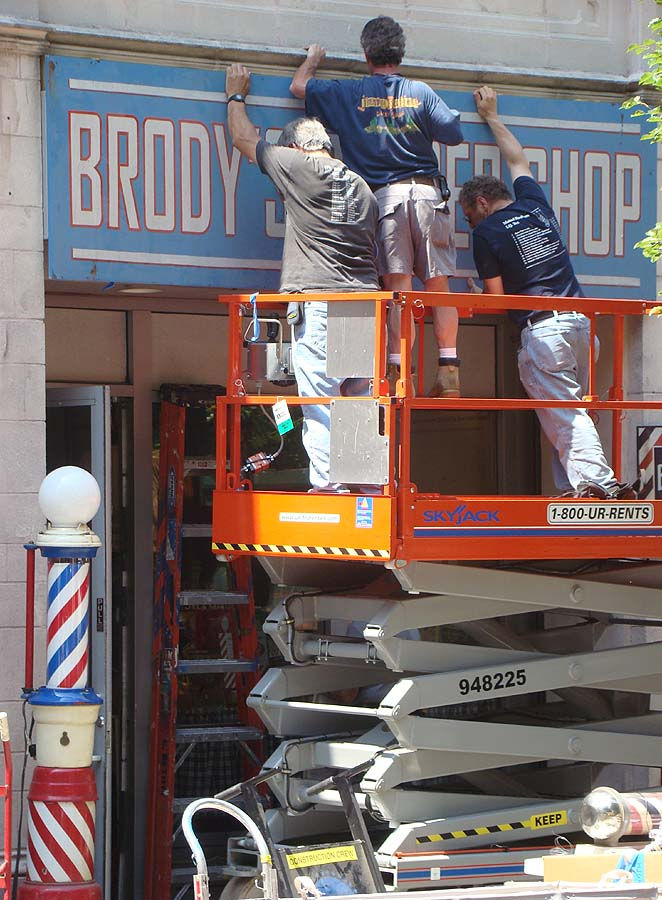
The production crew converting a storefront in downtown New Haven, Connecticut, to be used in a scene set in the 1950s

Unlike the previous films, Spielberg shot the entire film in the United States, stating he did not want to be away from his family. Principal photography began on June 18, 2007, in Deming, New Mexico. An extensive chase scene set at the fictional Marshall College was filmed between June 28 and July 7 at Yale University in New Haven, Connecticut (where Spielberg's son Theo was studying). To keep in line with the fact the story takes place in the 1950s, several facades were changed, although signs were put up in between shots to tell the public what the store or restaurant actually was.

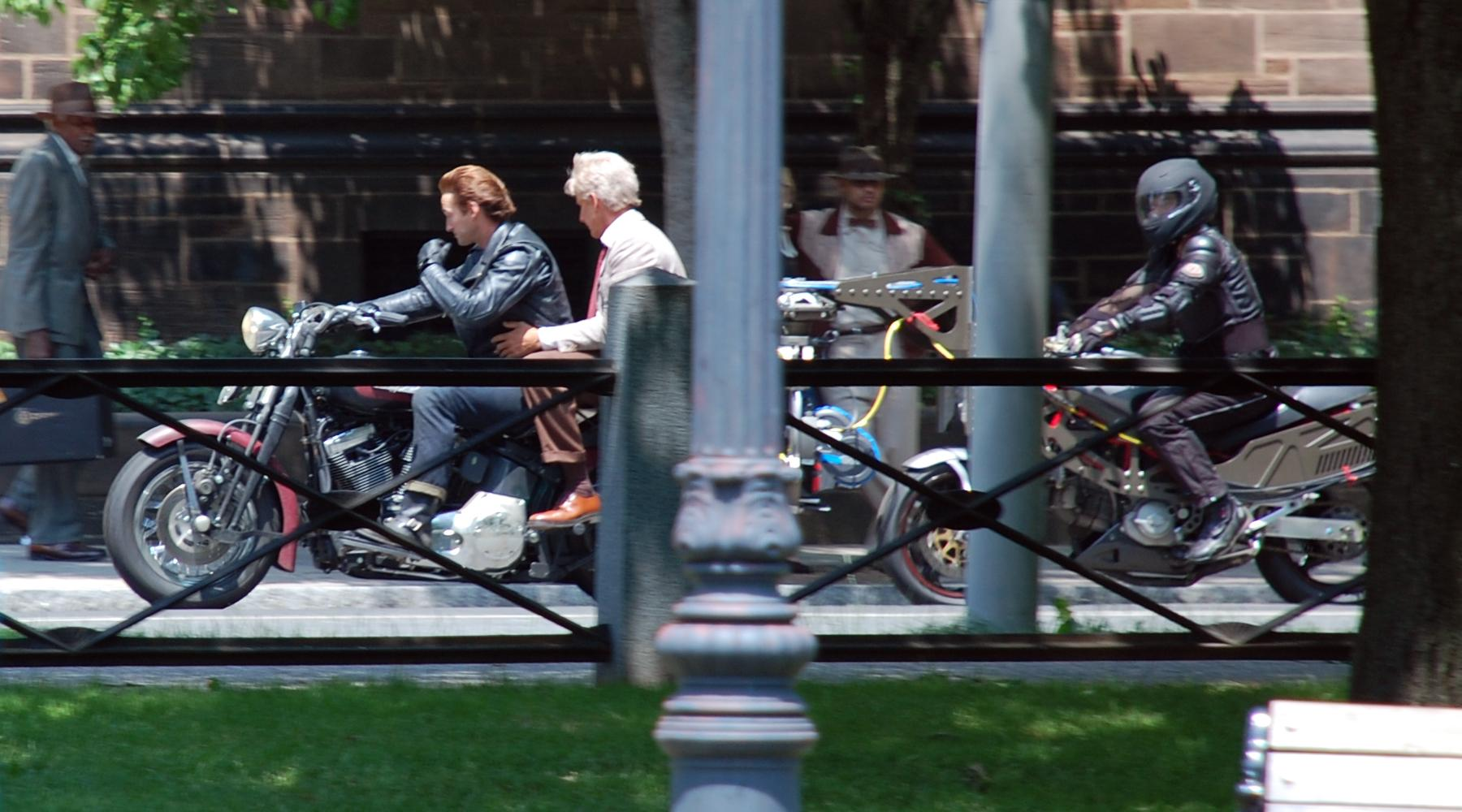
Harrison Ford and Shia LaBeouf's stunt doubles during filming in 2007 in New Haven, Connecticut

Afterwards, they filmed scenes set in the Amazon jungle in Hilo, Hawaii until August. Indiana Jones and the Kingdom of the Crystal Skull was the biggest film shot in Hawaii since Waterworld (1995), and was estimated to generate US$22 million to $45 million in the local economy. Because of an approaching hurricane, Spielberg was unable to shoot a fight at a waterfall, so he sent the second unit to film shots of Brazil's and Argentina's Iguazu Waterfalls. These were digitally combined into the fight, which was shot at the Universal backlot. During the scene where Indy drives through the wall with a vehicle, the vehicle contain explosives that survived, Ford stated that if the explosives had gone off it would have caused a "stitchable".

Half the film was scheduled to shoot on five sound stages at Los Angeles: Downey, Sony, Warner Bros., Paramount and Universal. Filming moved to Chandler Field in Fresno, California, substituting for Mexico City International Airport, on October 11, 2007. After shooting aerial shots of Chandler Airport and a DC-3 on the morning of October 12, 2007, filming wrapped. Although he originally found no need for re-shoots after viewing his first cut of the film, Spielberg decided to add an establishing shot filmed on February 29, 2008, in Pasadena, California.

=== Design ===
Spielberg and Janusz Kamiński, who has shot all of the director's films since Schindler's List, reviewed the previous films to study Douglas Slocombe's style. "I didn't want Janusz to modernize and bring us into the 21st century", Spielberg explained. "I still wanted the film to have a lighting style not dissimilar to the work Doug Slocombe had achieved, which meant that both Janusz and I had to swallow our pride. Janusz had to approximate another cinematographer's look, and I had to approximate this younger director's look that I thought I had moved away from after almost two decades". Spielberg also hired production designer Guy Hendrix Dyas after admiring his design work for Superman Returns (2006). Spielberg did not want to fast cut action scenes, relying on his script instead for a fast pace, and had confirmed in 2002 that he would not shoot the film digitally, a format Lucas had adopted for Star Wars Episode II: Attack of the Clones (2002) and Star Wars Episode III: Revenge of the Sith (2005). Lucas felt "it looks like it was shot three years after Last Crusade. The people, the look of it, everything. You'd never know there was 20 years between shooting". Kamiński commented upon watching the three films back-to-back, he was amazed how each of them advanced technologically, but were all nevertheless consistent, neither too brightly or darkly lit. Stan Winston helped supervise the special effects that went into the designs of the interdimensional beings.

While shooting War of the Worlds (2005) in late 2004, Spielberg met with the film's stunt coordinator and second unit director Vic Armstrong, who doubled for Ford in the previous films, to discuss three action sequences he had envisioned. However, Armstrong was busy filming second unit footage under Rob Cohen for The Mummy: Tomb of the Dragon Emperor (2008) during shooting of Kingdom of the Crystal Skull, so Dan Bradley was hired as second unit director instead. Bradley and Spielberg used previsualization for all the action scenes, except the motorcycle chase at Marshall College, because that idea was conceived after the animators had left. Bradley drew traditional storyboards instead, and was given free rein to create dramatic moments, just as Michael D. Moore did when directing second unit for the original trilogy, such as the truck chase in Raiders of the Lost Ark. Spielberg improvised on set, changing the location of Mutt and Spalko's duel from the ground to on top of vehicles.

The Ark of the Covenant is seen in a broken crate during the Hangar 51 opening sequence. Lucasfilm used the same prop from Raiders of the Lost Ark. Guards were hired to protect the highly sought-after piece of film memorabilia during the day of its use. A replica of the staff carried by Charlton Heston in The Ten Commandments (1956) was also used to populate the set to illustrate the hangar's history.

=== Effects ===
Stunts involving vehicles were shot on location in Hawaii, while CGI was used to add plants to the forest.

Marshall stated in 2003 that the film would use traditional stunt work so as to be consistent with the previous films. CGI was used to remove the visible safety wires on the actors when they did their stunts, such as when Indy swings on a lamp with his whip. Timed explosives were used for a scene where Indiana drives a truck through crates. During the take, an explosive failed to detonate and landed in the seat beside Ford. It did not go off and he was not injured.

Spielberg stated before production began that very few CGI effects would be used to maintain consistency with the other films. During filming significantly more CGI work was done than initially anticipated as in many cases it proved to be more practical. There ended up being a total of about 450 CGI shots in the film, with an estimated 30% of the film's shots containing CG matte paintings. Spielberg initially wanted brushstrokes to be visible on the paintings for added consistency with the previous films, but decided against it. The script also required a non-deforested jungle for a chase scene, but this would have been unsafe and much CGI work was done to create the jungle action sequence. Visual effects supervisor Pablo Helman, who worked on Lucas' Star Wars: Episode I – The Phantom Menace (1999) and Star Wars: Episode II – Attack of the Clones (2002) as well as Spielberg's War of the Worlds and Munich, traveled to Brazil and Argentina to photograph elements that were composited into the final images. Industrial Light and Magic then effectively created a virtual jungle with a geography like the real Amazon.

The appearance of a live alien and flying saucer was in flux. Spielberg wanted the alien to resemble a Grey alien, and also rejected early versions of the saucer that looked "too Close Encounters". Art director Christian Alzmann said the esthetic was "looking at a lot of older B-movie designs—but trying to make that look more real and gritty to fit in with the Indy universe". Other reference for the visual effects work included government tapes of nuclear tests, and video reference of real prairie dogs shot in 1080p by Nathan Edward Denning.

== Soundtrack ==
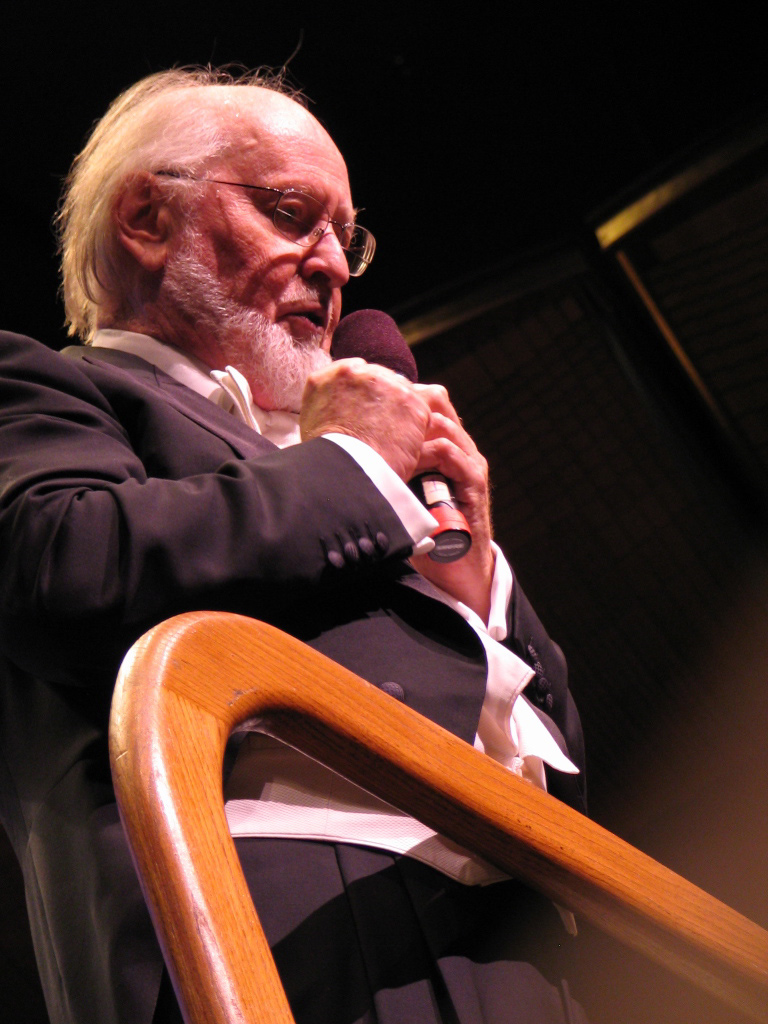
John Williams, who was the composer of the film's score

John Williams began composing the score in October 2007, 10 days of recording sessions wrapped on March 6, 2008, at Sony Pictures Studios. Williams described composing for the Indiana Jones universe again as "like sitting down and finishing a letter that you started 25 years ago". He reused Indiana's theme (The Raiders March) and also Marion's from Raiders of the Lost Ark, and also composed five new motifs for Mutt, Spalko and the skull. Williams gave Mutt's a swashbuckling feel, and homaged film noir and 1950s B-movies for Spalko and the crystal skull respectively. The movie's first scene is accompanied by Elvis Presley's 1956 version of "Hound Dog", arguably the biggest hit of the movie's era, and an RIAA-certified 4× Platinum recording. As an in-joke, Williams incorporated a measure and a half of Johannes Brahms' "Academic Festival Overture" when Indiana and Mutt crash into the library. The soundtrack features a Continuum, an instrument often used for sound effects instead of music. The Concord Music Group released the soundtrack on May 20, 2008.

== Release ==
The Kingdom of the Crystal Skull premiered at the Cannes Film Festival on May 18, 2008, a couple of days ahead of its worldwide May 21–23 release. It was the first Spielberg film since 1982's E.T. the Extra-Terrestrial to premiere at Cannes. The film was released in approximately 4,000 theaters in the United States, and dubbed into 25 languages for its worldwide release. More than 12,000 release prints were distributed, which is the largest in Paramount Pictures' history. Although Spielberg insisted his films only be watched traditionally using a film projector at theaters, Paramount chose to release the film in digital cinemas as part of a scheme to convert 10,000 U.S. cinemas to the format. The Kingdom of the Crystal Skull is also notable for being the last film in the series to be distributed by Paramount, as Walt Disney Studios released the fifth film on June 30, 2023, since its parent company's acquisition of Lucasfilm in 2012.

=== Secrecy ===
Frank Marshall remarked, "In today's information age, secrecy has been a real challenge. ... People actually said, 'No, we're going to respect Steven's vision.'" Prior to release, moviegoers on the Internet scrutinized numerous photos and the film's promotional Lego sets in hope of understanding plot details. Spielberg biographer Ian Freer wrote, "What Indy IV is actually about has been the great cultural guessing game of 2007/08. Yet, it has to be said, there is something refreshing about being ten weeks away from a giant blockbuster and knowing next to nothing about it." To distract investigative fans from the film's title during filming, five fake titles were registered with the Motion Picture Association of America; The City of Gods, The Destroyer of Worlds, The Fourth Corner of the Earth, The Lost City of Gold and The Quest for the Covenant. Lucas and Spielberg had also wanted to keep Karen Allen's return a secret until the film's release, but decided to confirm it at the 2007 Comic-Con.

An extra in the film, Tyler Nelson, violated his nondisclosure agreement in an interview with the Edmond Sun on September 17, 2007, which was then picked up by the mainstream media. It is unknown if he remained in the final cut. At Nelson's request, The Edmond Sun subsequently pulled the story from its website. On October 2, 2007, a Superior Court order was filed finding that Nelson knowingly violated the agreement. The terms of the settlement were not disclosed. A number of production photos and sensitive documents pertaining to the film's production budget were also stolen from Spielberg's production office. The Los Angeles County Sheriff's Department set up a sting operation after being alerted by a webmaster that the thief might try to sell the photos. On October 4, 2007, the seller, 37-year-old Roderick Eric Davis, was arrested. He pleaded guilty to two felony counts and was sentenced to two years and four months in prison.

=== Marketing ===
Howard Roffman, president of Lucas Licensing, attributed the film's large marketing campaign to it having been "nineteen years since the last film, and we are sensing a huge pent-up demand for everything Indy". Marketing relied heavily on the public's nostalgia for the series, with products taking inspiration from all four films. Paramount spent at least $150 million to promote the film, whereas most film promotions range from $70 to 100 million. As well as fans, the film also needed to appeal to younger viewers. Licensing deals include Expedia, Dr Pepper, Burger King, M&M's, Snickers, Lunchables, and Papa John's. Paramount along with Blockbuster sponsored an Indiana Jones open wheel car for Marco Andretti in the 2008 Indianapolis 500, and his racing suit was designed to resemble Indiana Jones's outfit. Andretti would go on to finish third in the race. The distributor also paired with M&M's to sponsor the No. 18 Joe Gibbs Racing Toyota, with NASCAR driver Kyle Busch behind the wheel, in the 2008 Dodge Challenger 500 at Darlington Raceway. Kyle Busch and the No. 18 team won the race and visited victory lane with Indiana Jones on the car. With the film's release, producer Frank Marshall and UNESCO worked together to promote conservation of World Heritage Sites around the world. Disneyland hosted "Indiana Jones Summer of Hidden Mysteries" to promote the film's release.

The Boston-based design studio Creative Pilot created the packaging style for the film's merchandise, which merged Drew Struzan's original illustrations "with a fresh new look, which showcases the whip, a map and exotic hieroglyphic patterns". Hasbro, Lego, Sideshow Collectibles, Topps, Diamond Select, Hallmark Cards, and Cartamundi all sold products. A THQ mobile game based on the film was released, as was a Lego video game based on the past films. Lego also released a series of computer-animated spoofs, Lego Indiana Jones and the Raiders of the Lost Brick, directed by Peder Pedersen. Stern Pinball released a new Indiana Jones pinball machine, designed by John Borg, based on all four films. From October 2007 to April 2008, the re-edited episodes of The Young Indiana Jones Chronicles were released in three DVD box sets.

Random House, Dark Horse Comics, Diamond Comic Distributors, Scholastic, and DK published books, including James Rollins's novelization of Kingdom of the Crystal Skull, winner of the 2009 Scribe Award for best adapted novel, a two-issue comic book adaptation written by John Jackson Miller and drawn by Luke Ross (Samurai: Heaven and Earth), children's novelizations of all four films, the Indiana Jones Adventures comic book series aimed at children, and the official Indiana Jones Magazine. Scholastic featured Indiana and Mutt on the covers of Scholastic News and Scholastic Maths, to the concern of parents, though Jack Silbert, editor of the latter, felt the film would interest children in archaeology.

== Home media ==
The film was released on DVD and Blu-ray Disc in North America on October 14, 2008, and in the UK on November 10. This THX certified release includes a two-disc special-edition DVD, a two-disc special-edition Blu-ray, and a single-disc edition DVD. On September 18, 2012, it was re-released on Blu-ray as part of Indiana Jones: The Complete Adventures.

In 2021, a remastered 4K version of the film was released by Paramount and Lucasfilm on Ultra HD Blu-ray, produced using scans of the original negatives. It was released as part of a box set for the then four films in the Indiana Jones film series.

As of October 16, 2013, the film has made $117,239,631 in revenue through home media.

== Reception ==
=== Box office ===
Box office revenue			Box office ranking		Reference
United States and Canada	Other territories	Worldwide	All time U.S. and Canada	All time worldwide	Reference
$317,101,119	$469,534,914	$786,636,033	No. 108	No. 124	

Indiana Jones and the Kingdom of the Crystal Skull is distributed by one entity, Paramount, but owned by another, Lucasfilm. The pre-production arrangement between the two organizations granted Paramount 12.5% of the film's revenue. As the $185 million budget was larger than initially expected, Lucas, Spielberg and Ford turned down large upfront salaries so Paramount could cover the film's costs. For Paramount to see a profit beyond its distribution fee, the film had to make over $400 million. At that point, Lucas, Spielberg, Ford, and those with smaller profit-sharing deals would also begin to collect their cut.

The film was released on May 22, 2008, in the United States and Canada, playing at 4,260 theaters. At that time, it achieved the third-highest number of screenings, behind Pirates of the Caribbean: At World's End and Spider-Man 3. For its opening day, the film earned $25 million domestically, making it the fourth-highest Thursday opening, behind Star Wars: Episode II – Attack of the Clones, The Matrix Reloaded and Star Wars: Episode III – Revenge of the Sith. In its opening weekend, it grossed an estimated $101 million and ranked number one at the box office. The film would go on to set opening weekend records for both a Steven Spielberg film and Harrison Ford film, breaking the previous records held by The Lost World: Jurassic Park and Air Force One simultaneously. Within its first five days of release, it grossed $151.1 million, combined with $126 million from the four-day opening weekend. It ranked as the second-biggest Memorial Day weekend release, after Pirates of the Caribbean: At World's End. During Memorial Day, the film had already generated a total of $26.7 million, becoming the second-highest Monday gross of any film, trailing only behind Spider-Man 2. It was the third-most-successful film of 2008 domestically, behind The Dark Knight and Iron Man, respectively, and the year's second-highest-grossing film internationally, behind The Dark Knight. In February 2010, it was the 25th-highest-grossing film of all time domestically, and 44th-highest-grossing worldwide, as well as the most financially successful Indiana Jones film when not adjusted for inflation of ticket prices.

=== Critical response ===
On review aggregator Rotten Tomatoes, 77% of 307 critic reviews are positive and the average rating is 7/10. The website's critical consensus reads, "Though the plot elements are certainly familiar, Indiana Jones and the Kingdom of the Crystal Skull still delivers the thrills and Harrison Ford's return in the title role is more than welcome." Metacritic assigned the film a weighted average score of 65 out of 100 based on 40 critics, indicating "generally favorable" reviews.

Roger Ebert gave the film three and a half stars out of four, the same rating he gave The Last Crusade, finding it "same old, same old", but what "I want it to be", particularly as "a lover of pulp fiction":

What I want is goofy action–lots of it. I want man-eating ants, swordfights between two people balanced on the backs of speeding jeeps, caverns of gold, vicious femme fatales, plunges down three waterfalls in a row, and the explanation for flying saucers. And throw in lots of monkeys.

Leonard Maltin also gave the film 3½ stars out of 4, more than he gave Temple of Doom and Last Crusade, and wrote that "Indy returns with the same brand of high adventure that marked the original Raiders of the Lost Ark." Empire's Damon Wise criticized the use of CGI but praised Ford's performance and wrote that "It won't change your life but, if you're in the right frame of mind, it will change your mood: you might wince, you might groan, you might beg to differ on the big, silly climax, but you'll never stop smiling."

James Berardinelli gave the film 2 stars out of 4, calling it "the most lifeless of the series" and "simply [not] a very good motion picture." Margaret Pomeranz of At the Movies gave the film 2½ stars out of 5, saying that the filmmakers "had 19 years since the last Indiana Jones movie to come up with something truly exciting and fresh, but I feel there's a certain laziness and cynicism in this latest adventure." Associated Press reported that J. Sperling Reich, writing for FilmStew.com, said: "It really looked like they were going through the motions. It really looked like no one had their heart in it." USA Today stated reviews were "mixed" and reviewers felt the "movie suffers from predictable plot points and cheesy special effects."

=== International reaction ===
The Communist Party of the Russian Federation called for a ban on the film, accusing the production team of "demonizing" the Soviet Union. Spielberg responded: "When we decided the fourth installment would take place in 1957, we had no choice but to make the Russians the enemies. World War II had just ended and the Cold War had begun. The U.S. didn't have any other enemies at the time."

The film's depiction of Peru also received criticism from the Peruvian and Mexican public, as it jumbles elements of Precolumbian cultures from those countries (like references to Maya that never lived in Perù).

=== Audience reception and legacy ===
Audiences surveyed by CinemaScore gave the film an average rating of "B" on an A+ to F scale, down from the previous film's "A". According to Associated Press, Indiana Jones and the Kingdom of the Crystal Skull received a "respectful" but "far from glowing" reception from Indiana Jones fans, and that "some viewers at its first press screening loved it, some called it slick and enjoyable though formulaic, some said it was not worth the 19-year wait." South Park parodied the film in the episode "The China Probrem", broadcast five months after the film's release. The episode parodied the negative fan reaction, with the characters filing a police report against Lucas and Spielberg for "raping Indiana Jones".

Some disappointed Indiana Jones fans used the term "nuking the fridge", a reference to the scene in which Jones survives a nuclear blast by hiding in a refrigerator, to denote the point when a franchise crosses into the absurd, similar to "jumping the shark". This phrase has appeared across the internet, and was chosen as No. 5 on Time magazine's list of "top ten buzzwords" of 2008. Asked about the scene and phrase, Spielberg said: "Blame me. Don't blame George. That was my silly idea ... I'm proud of that. I'm glad I was able to bring that into popular culture." Lucas denied this, saying Spielberg was "trying to protect" him. According to Lucas, he had assembled a dossier of research data to convince Spielberg; Lucas stated that his research claimed the odds of surviving in the refrigerator are about "50-50."

The mixed fanbase reaction did not surprise Lucas, who was familiar with mixed response to the Star Wars prequels, and predicted that "we're all going to get people throwing tomatoes at us." According to Lucas, fans are "always going to be upset. 'Why did he do it like this? And why didn't he do it like this?' They write their own movie, and then, if you don't do their movie, they get upset about it". David Koepp said: "I knew I was going to get hammered from a number of quarters [but] what I liked about the way the movie ended up playing was it was popular with families. I like that families really embraced it." Although Spielberg said "I'm very happy with the movie. I always have been", he also said "I sympathize with people who didn't like the MacGuffin [the interdimensional beings] because I never liked the MacGuffin." Koepp also disliked the inclusion of aliens and had made a failed suggestion to use a different story idea. Reflecting on the film in 2022, producer Kathleen Kennedy said "we may not have had as strong a story as we wanted".

At the 2010 Cannes Film Festival, LaBeouf told Los Angeles Times he had "dropped the ball on the legacy that people loved and cherished" and felt that "the movie could have been updated ... we just misinterpreted what we were trying to satiate." In 2011, in response to LaBeouf's comments, Harrison Ford said: "I think I told [LaBeouf] he was a fucking idiot ... As an actor, I think it's my obligation to support the film without making a complete ass of myself. Shia is ambitious, attentive and talented—and he's learning how to deal with a situation which is very unique and difficult." LaBeouf said he regretted his comments and their effect on his relationship with Spielberg: "He told me there's a time to be a human being and have an opinion, and there's a time to sell cars. It brought me freedom, but it also killed my spirits because this was a dude I looked up to like a sensei."

Film critic Matt Zoller Seitz praised the film despite its alienation of fans, understanding that the film was "more an ensemble piece" compared to the previous films in the series, but adding that "there was a point to this approach: Crystal Skull was Spielberg's immense and spectacular version of an Old Man movie.... rather like the films Howard Hawks and John Ford were making in the mid- to late '60s". Seitz also considers the "nuke the fridge" scene as one of the series' best, stating that "It brings Indy forward into the world that birthed Steven Spielberg and his Boomer-fueled fantasies of earlier generations. And the construction of it, the shots and cuts, is brilliant. The ramping up. The satirical touches. And the 'nuclear family' pun at the heart of it." Rewatching the film 15 years later, Jeff Ames at ComingSoon said his initial like of the film had been because it was an Indiana Jones sequel, but he said it now "feels like a missed opportunity".

== Accolades ==
The film was nominated for Best Action Movie at the 2009 Critics' Choice Awards. The Visual Effects Society nominated it for Best Single Visual Effect of the Year (the valley destruction), Best Outstanding Matte Paintings, Best Models and Miniatures, and Best Created Environment in a Feature Motion Picture (the inside of the temple). The film ranks 453rd on Empire's 2008 list of the 500 greatest movies of all time. It was nominated at the Saturn Awards for Best Science Fiction Film, Best Director, Best Actor, Best Supporting Actor, Best Costumes and Best Special Effects. It won Best Costumes. At the 51st Grammy Awards, John Williams won an award for the Mutt Williams theme.

In 2008, the film won the Razzie Award for Worst Prequel, Remake, Rip-off or Sequel. Comcast voted it the 11th-worst film sequel of all time. Paste magazine ranked the movie 10th on its list "The 20 Worst Sequels to Good Movies". Listverse.com ranked the film 8th on its list of the "Top 10 Worst Movie Sequels".

Award	Category	Recipient	Result
British Academy Film Awards	Best Special Visual Effects	Pablo Helman, Marshall Krasser, Steve Rawlins	Nominated
Critics' Choice Awards	Best Action Movie	Indiana Jones and the Kingdom of the Crystal Skull	Nominated
Golden Raspberry Awards	Worst Prequel, Remake, Rip-off or Sequel	Indiana Jones and the Kingdom of the Crystal Skull	Won
MTV Movie Awards	Best Summer Movie So Far	Indiana Jones and the Kingdom of the Crystal Skull	Nominated
Saturn Awards	Best Science Fiction Film	Indiana Jones and the Kingdom of the Crystal Skull	Nominated
Saturn Awards	Best Director	Steven Spielberg	Nominated
Saturn Awards	Best Actor	Harrison Ford	Nominated
Saturn Awards	Best Supporting Actor	Shia LaBeouf	Nominated
Saturn Awards	Best Costume Design	Mary Zophres	Won
Saturn Awards	Best Special Effects	Pablo Helman, Daniel Sudick	Nominated
Screen Actors Guild Awards	Outstanding Performance by a Stunt Ensemble in a Motion Picture	Indiana Jones and the Kingdom of the Crystal Skull	Nominated
Visual Effects Society Awards	Best Single Visual Effect of the Year	Stephanie Hornish, Pablo Helman, Jeff White, Craig Hammack	Nominated
Visual Effects Society Awards	Outstanding Matte Paintings in a Feature Motion Picture	Richard Bluff, Barry Williams, Yannick Dusseault, Yusei Uesugi	Nominated
Visual Effects Society Awards	Outstanding Models and Miniatures in a Feature Motion Picture	David Fogler, Craig Hammack, Brian Gernand, Geoff Herson	Nominated
Visual Effects Society Awards	Outstanding Created Environment in a Feature Motion Picture	Michael Halsted, David Fogler, Steve Walton, David Weitzberg	Nominated

=== Lawsuit ===
In late 2012, the director of the Institute of Archaeology of Belize, Dr. Jaime Awe, sued Lucasfilm, Disney, and Paramount Pictures on behalf of the country Belize for using the Mitchell-Hedges skull's "likeness" in the film. Awe claimed that if the Mitchell-Hedges skull was actually found in Belize, then it had been stolen from his country, and the defendants were profiting off its likeness.

== Sequel ==
On March 15, 2016, Walt Disney Studios announced that Spielberg and Ford would both return for a fifth Indiana Jones film, initially scheduled for release on July 19, 2019. After multiple delays, this was finally changed to June 30, 2023. In February 2020, it was revealed that Spielberg had stepped down as the film's director and that James Mangold had entered negotiations to direct. The fifth film, Indiana Jones and the Dial of Destiny, was released by Disney on June 30, 2023.

== See also ==
- Crystal skulls in popular culture
- List of films featuring extraterrestrials

== Works cited ==
- Chitwood, Adam (February 12, 2019). "The Long Development History of 'Indiana Jones and the Kingdom of the Crystal Skull', Explained". Collider.
- Rinzler, J.W.; Bouzereau, Laurent (2008). The Complete Making of Indiana Jones. Random House. ISBN 9780091926618.
