= Crystal skulls in popular culture =

Crystal skulls are human skull hardstone carvings made of clear or milky quartz rock, known in art history as "rock crystal". They are often claimed to be pre-Columbian Mesoamerican artifacts by their alleged finders. However, none of the specimens made available for scientific study have been authenticated as pre-Columbian in origin. Despite some claims presented in an assortment of popularizing literature, legends of crystal skulls with mystical powers do not figure in genuine Mesoamerican or other Native American mythologies and spiritual accounts.

The skulls are often claimed to exhibit paranormal phenomena by some members of the New Age movement, and they have often been portrayed as such in fiction. Crystal skulls have been a popular subject appearing in numerous sci-fi television series, novels, and video games.

== List of use in popular culture ==
- For the Love of God, a diamond-encrusted skull made by English artist Damien Hirst
- Crystal Head Vodka, a Canadian vodka brand co-founded by actor Dan Aykroyd, whose bottles are shaped like crystal skulls
- Crystal skulls are featured in an episode of the 1980 British TV series Arthur C. Clarke's Mysterious World.
- House II: The Second Story, a 1987 American comedy horror film whose plotline involves a pre-Columbian crystal skull
- A crystal skull appears in the 1995 Flight of the Amazon Queen adventure video game.
- The Crystal Skull, a 1996 adventure game that features a crystal skull
- In episode 36 of the American animated television series Extreme Ghostbusters, ghosts are stealing crystal skulls from various locations.
- Persona 2: Innocent Sin, a 1999 role-playing game that features a set of crystal skulls
  - Persona 5 (2016) and Persona 5 Royal (2019) feature Crystal Skull as an enemy monster that can be battled and recruited.
- "Crystal Skull", episode 21 of Season 3 of the TV series Stargate SG-1, involves a crystal skull.
- A psytrance compilation CD named The Mystery of the Thirteen Crystal Skulls was released in 2001.
- "Skulls", the third episode of Veritas: The Quest, involves a crystal skull.
- The Librarian: Return to King Solomon's Mines, a 2006 American film, features a crystal skull.
- Blood Mountain, 2006 studio album by the American heavy metal band Mastodon, one of whose tracks revolves around a crystal skull
- Legend of the Crystal Skull, a 2007 Nancy Drew video game that involves searching for a lost crystal skull
- The Crystal Skull, a 2007 novel by Scottish author Manda Scott
- Indiana Jones and the Kingdom of the Crystal Skull, 2008 American adventure film that revolves around a fictional backstory to the lore of crystal skulls
- 50 Cent: Blood on the Sand, a 2009 video game in which rapper 50 Cent fights his way through a desert after someone steals his crystal skull

== See also ==
- Crystal skull
