= Jane MacLaren Walsh =

American anthropologist

- Education: M.A. University of the Americas, Ph.D. Catholic University of America
- Known for: pre-Columbian artifact curating and investigations
- Scientific career
- Fields: Anthropology, Archaeology
- Workplaces: National Museum of Natural History

Jane MacLaren Walsh is an anthropologist and researcher at the Smithsonian's National Museum of Natural History in Washington, D.C. She is known for her role in exposing faked pre-Columbian artifacts.

== Early life and education ==
Walsh grew up in Mexico and studied at the University of the Americas for B.A. and M.A. degrees. She received her Ph.D. in anthropology at Catholic University of America with the doctoral thesis "Myth and imagination in the American story : the Coronado expedition, 1540-1542."

== Career ==
Walsh's research specialty is crystal skulls, an artifact type often purported to be of Precolumbian origin and frequently revealed as hoaxes by archaeologists. Her interest in these objects began with the anonymous delivery of one such object to the Smithsonian in 1992.

Notable cases she has investigated include crystal skulls alleged to have been of ancient Mesoamerican (mostly Aztec) origins, and a piece held by the Dumbarton Oaks Research Library and Collection purported to be an authentic pre-Columbian representation of Tlazolteotl, an Aztec and central Mexican goddess.

== Selected works ==
- Walsh, Jane MacLaren (1997). "Crystal skulls and other problems: or, "don't look it in the eye"". In Amy Henderson; Adrienne L. Kaeppler (eds.). Exhibiting Dilemmas: Issues of Representation at the Smithsonian. Washington, DC: Smithsonian Institution Press. ISBN 1-56098-690-5. OCLC 34598037.
- Walsh, Jane MacLaren (Spring 2005). "What is Real? A New Look at PreColumbian Mesoamerican Collections" (PDF online publication). AnthroNotes: Museum of Natural History Publication for Educators. 26 (1). Washington, DC: Smithsonian Institution and the National Museum of Natural History Anthropology Outreach Office: 1–7, 17–19. doi:10.5479/10088/22411. ISSN 1548-6680. OCLC 8029636.
- Walsh, Jane MacLaren (2008a). "Legend of the Crystal Skulls" (online edition). Archaeology. 61 (3). New York: Archaeological Institute of America: 36–41. ISSN 0003-8113. OCLC 1481828. Archived from the original on 2011-01-11. "the Tlazolteotl idol, like the crystal skulls, is a nineteenth-century fake."
- Walsh, Jane MacLaren (2008b). "La Tlazolteotl de Dumbarton Oaks: un regard sous la surface" [The Dumbarton Oaks Tlazolteotl: looking beneath the surface] (English abstract). Journal de la Société des Américanistes (in French). 94 (1). Paris: Société des Américanistes: 7–43. doi:10.4000/jsa.8623.
- Walsh, Jane MacLaren; Brett Topping (2019). The Man Who Invented Aztec Crystal Skulls: The Adventures of Eugène Boban. New York and Oxford: Berghahn Books. ISBN 978-1-78920-095-9.
