= Esad Čolaković =

Macedonian footballer

Personal information
- Full name: Esad Čolaković
- Date of birth: 27 April 1970
- Place of birth: SFR Yugoslavia
- Date of death: 26 May 2016 (aged 46)
- Place of death: Skopje, Macedonia
- Position: Defender

Senior career*
Years	Team	Apps	(Gls)
–2000	Sloga Jugomagnat		
2000–2001	Vardar		
2001–2002	Cementarnica		
2002–2003	Kumanovo		
2003–2005	Sloga Jugomagnat		

International career
1998	Macedonia	1	(0)
- * Club domestic league appearances and goals

Esad Čolaković (Macedonian: Есад Чолаковиќ; 27 April 1970 – 26 May 2016) was a Macedonian football defender of Bosniak descent, who last played for FK Sloga Jugomagnat.

== International career ==
He made his senior debut for Macedonia in an April 1998 friendly match against South Korea, which proved to be his sole international game.

== Death ==
Čolaković died in Skopje on 26 May 2016.

== Honours ==
- Macedonian First League: 2

1998–99, 1999–2000

== External sources ==
- Esad Čolaković at National-Football-Teams.com
