= Mijenjam =

Studio album by Boban Rajović
- Released: December 2010
- Recorded: Belgrade, Zemun
- Genre: Pop
- Label: City Records

Boban Rajović chronology
Najbolje do sada (2009)	Mijenjam (2010)

Mijenjam (English translation: I'm Changing) is the sixth studio album by Montenegrin singer Boban Rajović. It was released in December 2010.

== Track listing ==
1. Oprosti mi (Forgive Me)
2. Mijenjam (I'm Changing)
3. Zdravo mila (Hello Dear)
4. 011 (featuring Ivana Selakov)
5. Princeza (Princess)
6. Luda glava (Crazy Head)
7. Kraljica i kralj (Queen and King, featuring Alka Vuica)
8. Kafanski fakultet (Kafana College)
9. Jedan je život (Only One Life)
10. Ptica selica (Migratory Bird)
11. Kumovi (Friends)
12. 011 - Winter Mix (featuring Ivana Selakov)
