= Puklo srce =

Studio album by Boban Rajović
- Released: 2003
- Genre: Pop
- Label: Gold Music

Boban Rajović chronology
Boban (2000)	Puklo srce (2003)	Provokacija (2006)

Puklo srce (English translation: My Heart Exploded) is the second studio album by Montenegrin singer Boban Rajović. It was released in 2003.

== Track listing ==
1. Puklo srce (My Heart Exploded)
2. Papreno (Peppery)
3. Jesen je (It's Autumn)
4. Sad si s njim (Now You're with Him)
5. Bila si moj nemir (You Were My Unrest)
6. Vratiću se ja (I'll Return)
7. Igraj (Dance)
8. Karta za Raj (Ticket for Paradise)
9. Alkoholne injekcije (Alcohol Injections)
10. Samo pozovi (Just Call)
11. Dukati (Ducats)
12. Ruže daješ u pelinu (You Give Roses in Wormwood)
