= Provokacija =

Studio album by Boban Rajović
- Released: 2006
- Genre: Pop
- Length: 40:35
- Label: Sound Production

Boban Rajović chronology
Puklo srce (2003)	Provokacija (2006)	Usne boje vina (2007)

Provokacija (English translation: Provocation) is the third studio album by Montenegrin singer Boban Rajović. It was released in the summer of 2006.

== Track listing ==
Main songs

1. Koga foliraš (Who Are You Fooling)
2. Provokacija (Provocation)
3. Bilo bi zabavno (It Would Be Fun)
4. Presuda (Verdict, duet Katarina Kaya Ostojić)
5. Flaša (Bottle, cover of "Çıtı pıtı" by İsmail YK)
6. Nazdravi i zapjevaj (Toast and Sing)
7. Ubi me ti (You Killed Me, cover of "Osad Eini" by Amr Diab)
8. Na dan kad si rođena (On the Day You Were Born)
9. Jugoslavijo (Yugoslavia)

Bonus tracks

1. Puklo srce (My Heart Exploded)
2. Piroman (Arsonist)
