= Usne boje vina =

Studio album by Boban Rajović
- Released: May 2007
- Genre: pop
- Label: Sound Production

Boban Rajović chronology
Provokacija (2006)	Usne boje vina (2007)	Kosači (2008)

Usne boje vina (English translation: Lips the Color of Wine), incorrectly titled Usne (Lips) at its release, is a single and the fourth release by Montenegrin singer Boban Rajović. It was released in 2007.

== Track listing ==
Main song

1. Usne boje vina (Lips the Color of Wine)

Bonus tracks

1. Provokacija (Provocation)
2. Koga foliraš (Who Are You Fooling)
3. Na dan kad si rođena (On the Day You Were Born)
4. Jugoslavijo (Yugoslavia)
5. Flaša (Bottle)
6. Ruže daješ u pelinu (You Gives Roses in Wormwood)
7. Bila si moj nemir (You Were My Unrest)
8. Sad si s njim (Now You're with Him)
9. Evo jesen je (It's Autumn)
10. Puklo srce (My Heart Exploded)
11. Njena vrata (Her Door)
12. Aerodrom (Airport)
