= Boban Rajović =

Boban Rajović Бобан Рајовић
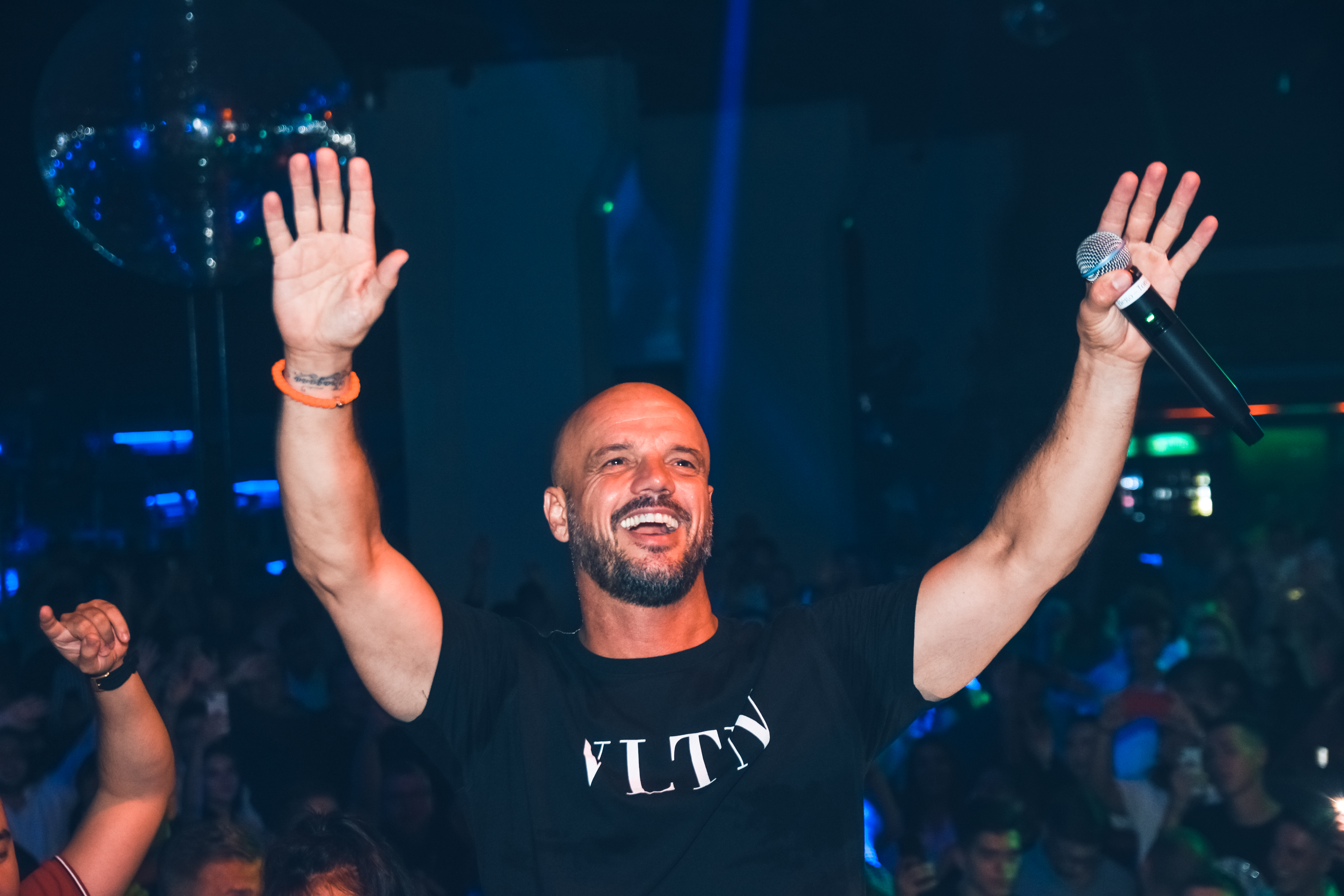
- Boban Rajović in 2019

Background information
- Also known as: Boban
- Born: 25 December 1971 (age 54); Copenhagen, Denmark
- Genres: turbo-folk
- Instrument: Vocals
- Years active: 1999–present
- Labels: Sound Production, Gold Music, City Records

Boban Rajović (pronounced [boban rajoʋitɕ]; born 25 December 1971 in Copenhagen, Denmark) is a Montenegrin singer popular in former Yugoslavia. Some of his big hit songs include "Usne boje vina" (Wine-colored Lips) and "Provokacija" (Provocation).

== Private life ==
Rajović was born in Copenhagen, Denmark, to parents that had migrated (see gastarbeiter) from Berane, SR Montenegro, Yugoslavia. At 19 years of age he started singing in Yugoslav-owned cafés in Scandinavia. His family patron saint (slava) is Saint Basil of Ostrog. He moved to Belgrade, Serbia, in 2000 to record his first album. He remains there. He is married to Dragana Rajović and has three children with her.

== Discography ==
Studio albums

- Boban (2000)
- Puklo srce (My Heart Exploded, 2003)
- Provokacija (Provocation, 2006)
- Usne boje vina (Lips the Color of Wine, 2007)
- Kosači (Mowers, 2008)
- Mijenjam (I'm Changing, 2010)
- Vojnik Zabluda (Soldier of Delusion, 2013)
- Dito (Here, 2018)
- Avion (Airplane, 2024)

Compilation albums

- Najbolje do sada (The Best Until Now, 2009)

As featured artist

- Persijska princeza (Princess of Persia, 2009) with Filip Filipi
- Mandolins Cry

Non-album singles

- Padobran, 2016
- Spartanac, 2018
- Kilometri ljubavi (with Ivan Zak), 2023
- Suze, 2024
