= Boban (album) =

Studio album by Boban Rajović
- Released: 2001
- Genre: Pop
- Label: City Records

Boban Rajović chronology
Boban (2001)	Puklo srce (2003)

Boban is the self-titled debut studio album by Montenegrin singer Boban Rajović. It was released in 2001.

== Track listing ==
1. Njena vrata (Her Door)
2. Piroman (Arsonist)
3. Barbika (Barbie)
4. Ti si mene vezala (You Tied Me)
5. Aerodrom (Airport)
6. Svako svoj traži put (Everyone Is Looking For Their Own Road)
7. Da pređemo na stvar (Cut to the Chase)
8. Lijepa kao grijeh (Beautiful as Sin)
