= Boban Vasov =

Serbian footballer

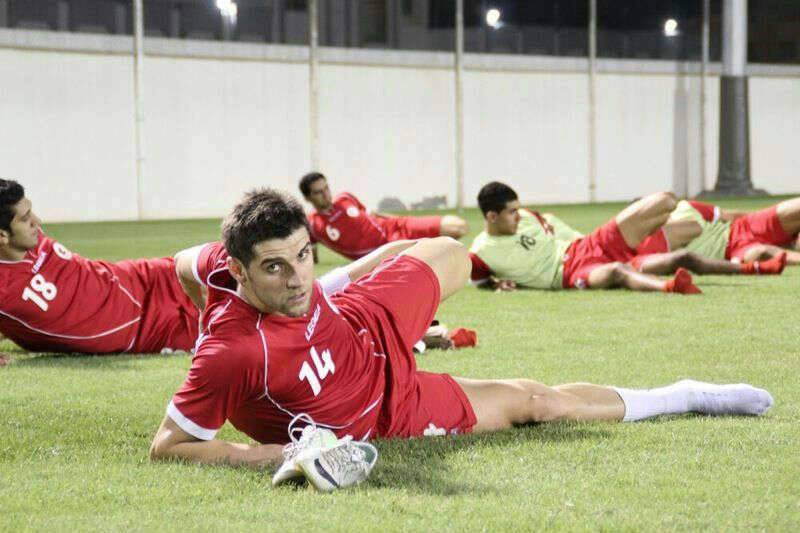

Personal information
- Full name: Boban Vasov
- Date of birth: 9 January 1986 (age 40)
- Place of birth: Dimitrovgrad, SFR Yugoslavia
- Height: 1.88 m (6 ft 2 in)
- Position: Central defender

Team information
- Current team: SC Aspang
- Number: 3

Youth career
- –2001: Radnički Pirot
- 2001–2007: Levski Sofia

Senior career*
Years	Team	Apps	(Gls)
2007	→ Marek Dupnitsa (loan)	0	(0)
2008–2009	FK Balkanski	40	(5)
2009–2012	Radnički Pirot	88	(14)
2012–2013	East Riffa Club	22	(3)
2014	Celje	3	(0)
2014–2016	Jagodina	0	(0)
2014–2016	→ Tabane Trgovački (loan)		
2016–2017	FK Balkanski		
2017–2018	FC Großklein	22	(3)
2018–2019	FC Ligist	20	(2)
2019–2021	SV Lannach	23	(0)
2022	UFC Strallegg	12	(0)
2022-	SC Aspang	62	(9)
- * Club domestic league appearances and goals as of 28 September 2025

Boban Vasov (Serbian Cyrillic: Бобан Васов; born 9 January 1986 in Dimitrovgrad) is a Serbian football player who plays for Austrian club SC Aspang.

== Club career ==
=== Serbia ===
In 2001, Radnički Pirot youth had a friendly game against Levski Sofia youth team, on which the scouts of the Sofia side spotted him and after a short trial period in Sofia, they decided to transfer him to their football academy.

=== Bulgaria ===
He started the 2001–02 season with Levski Sofia, playing as a central defender. Later the season, thanks to the good performances, he was selected to play both 1985 and 1986 youth teams. In 2002, Levski youth team wins a double by winning the Championship and the National Cup. Two years later, his team finished at the third place in the Championship and have won the National cup. After playing his last game for the youth squad he started to train with the senior team of Levski Sofia, but from the club decided to send him on loan to Marek Dupnitsa.

=== Back to Serbia ===
In January 2008 he returned to his hometown Dimitrovgrad to spend a year and a half at Balkanski. Here he plays a total of 40 games, scoring 5 goals. He catches the eye of the coach of his old club Radnički Pirot in the matches between the two teams in the league. In summer 2009 he moved back to Radnički Pirot. For 3 seasons here, he played 88 matches and scored 14 goals becoming one of the important players for the team. Putting down some great performances and by showing consistency in the games he catches the eye of the managers and soon after the end of the season in 2012 he transfers to the Bahrain side East Riffa Club.

=== Bahrain ===
In September 2012, he signed for East Riffa Club from Bahrain. With East Riffa Club he reaches the 2nd place in Second league and plays in the First league promotion Play-off. They have lost the play-off by losing the first leg away 1–0 to Malkiya Club and managing to draw 1–1 at home.

=== Celje ===
Boban Vasov has signed a contract with NK Celje on 31 January 2014.

=== FC Großklein ===
Vasov joined Austrian, FC Großklein, club in the summer 2017.
