= Boban Cenić =

Serbian footballer

Personal information
- Full name: Boban Cenić
- Date of birth: 13 November 1981 (age 44)
- Place of birth: Leskovac, SFR Yugoslavia
- Position: Defender

Senior career*
Years	Team	Apps	(Gls)
2001–2005	Radnički Niš	71	(6)
2005–2007	Vlasina	64	(1)
2007–2010	Mladi Radnik	78	(3)
2010	Universitatea Cluj	1	(0)
2011	Novi Pazar	0	(0)
2011–2012	Mladi Radnik	16	(0)
2012	Banat Zrenjanin	13	(0)
2013	Mladi Radnik	11	(0)
2013–2014	Moravac Mrštane	25	(1)
- * Club domestic league appearances and goals

Boban Cenić (Serbian Cyrillic: Бобан Ценић; born 13 November 1981) is a Serbian retired footballer who played as a defender.

Born in Leskovac, he played at the top level football in Serbia with Radnički Niš and Mladi Radnik. In 2010, he played in the Romanian Liga I at Universitatea Cluj.
