= Eugène Boban =

French antiquarian (1834–1908)

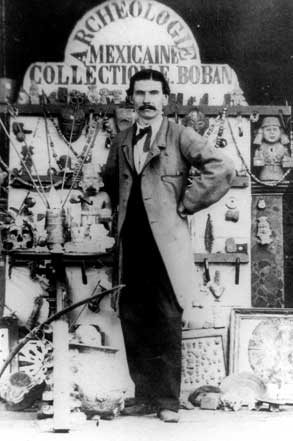
- Eugène Boban at the 1867 Paris Exposition
- Born: André Eugène Boban-Duvergé; 1834
- Died: 1908 (aged 73–74)
- Occupation: antiquarian
- Known for: crystal skulls

Eugène Boban or Boban-Duvergé (1834–1908) was a French antiquarian. He was the official archaeologist of the court of Maximilian I of Mexico, and a member of the French Scientific Commission in Mexico. He is known as a crystal skulls collector and dealer, one which is now in the Musée du Quai Branly and another in the British Museum.

== Career ==
Boban's surname is of Croatian origin. In 1857, he moved from France into Mexico and became fluent in both Spanish and Nahuatl. He headed an expedition commissioned by Napoleon III to collect Mexican art and artifacts, later exhibited at the Trocadéro Museum in connection with the International Exposition (1867). In 1885 he published a famous poster, Cuadro arqueológico y etnográfico de la republica mexicana. In July 1886, he moved his business to New York City. Two sale catalogues of his collection, catalogued by Edouard Frossard, were published in New York in 1887. In 1891, he organized and published the Aubin-Goupil Collection of manuscripts which Eugène Goupil had purchased two years prior, and are now in the Bibliothèque nationale. Ethnological objects from his collection were sold at Paris in 1908.

== Questions of authenticity ==
One of the crystal skulls supposedly originating from the Maya civilization which Boban is known to have sold - and is now on display at the British Museum - has been proven a fraudulent imitation produced in the 19th century.

== Published works ==
Boban's published works include:

- Eugéne Boban Antiquités mexicaines Paris, E. Leroux, 1875
- Bibliographie palèoethnologique 1881
- Cuadro arqueológico y etnográfico de la republica mexicana Mexico, Imp. de Muriga, 1885
- E. Boban Documents pour servir à histoire du Mexique Paris, E. Leroux, 1891
- Histoire de la nation Mexicaine 1893
