= Najbolje do sada (Boban Rajović album) =

Compilation album by Boban Rajović
- Released: 2009
- Recorded: 2003–2008
- Genre: Pop
- Label: Gold Music; Vujin Records

Boban Rajović chronology
Kosači (2008)	Najbolje do sada (2009)	Mijenjam (2010)

Singles from Najbolje do sada
- 1. "Gromovi" Released: 24 November 2009; 2. "Ružno pače" Released: 22 December 2009

Najbolje do sada (English translation: The Best Until Now) is the first greatest hits/compilation album by Montenegrin singer Boban Rajović. It was released in 2009.

The cover of the album was photographed by Belgrade-based photographer Andreja Damnjanović.

== Track listing ==
1. Ružno pače (Ugly Duckling)
2. Gromovi (Thunders, featuring Dragana Mirković)
3. Latice od ruža (Rose Petals)
4. Jesen je (It's Autumn)
5. Bila si moj nemir (You Were My Unrest)
6. Sad si s njim (Now You're with Him)
7. Puklo srce (My Heart Exploded)
8. Na dan kad si rođena (On the Day You Were Born)
9. Ubi me ti (You Killed Me)
10. Usne boje vina (Lips the Color of Wine)
11. Bata
12. Ljubav (Love)
13. Flaša (Bottle)
14. Da li, da li je (Is It, Is It)
15. Broj 23 (Number 23)
16. Pomozite mi drugovi (Help Me, Friends)
17. Kosači (Mowers)
18. Crna lala (Black Tulip)
19. Provokacija (Provocation')
20. Izdaja (Betrayal)
