= Boban Nikolovski =

Macedonian footballer

Personal information
- Full name: Boban Nikolovski
- Date of birth: 1 August 1977 (age 49)
- Place of birth: Kumanovo, SFR Yugoslavia
- Height: 1.68 m (5 ft 6 in)
- Position: Midfielder

Senior career*
Years	Team	Apps	(Gls)
1993–1995	Kumanovo		
1995–1996	Bor	18	(4)
1996–1997	Obilić		
1997–1998	Sutjeska Nikšić	3	(0)
1998–1999	OFK Beograd	16	(1)
1999	Železničar Beograd	13	(1)
2000–2002	Železnik	18	(1)
2002	Železničar Beograd	16	(1)
2002–2003	Srem	27	(10)
2003–2004	Hajduk Beograd	12	(2)
2004	→ Bor (loan)		
2004–200?	Radnički Niš		
200?–2009	Rudar Bor		
2009–2011	Krivelj		
2011–2012	Nemetali		

International career
	Macedonia U21	1	(11)
- * Club domestic league appearances and goals

Boban Nikolovski (Macedonian: Бобан Николовски; born 1 August 1977) is a Macedonian retired footballer who played as a midfielder.

== Club career ==
After starting to play in his hometown club FK Kumanovo, he moved to Serbia where he played for most of his career. He played with top league clubs as FK Obilić, OFK Beograd, FK Sutjeska Nikšić, FK Železnik and FK Hajduk Beograd, but also with other clubs as, FK Bor, FK Rudar Bor, FK Železničar Beograd, FK Srem.
