= Boban Birmančević =

Serbian politician

Boban Birmančević (Serbian Cyrillic: Бобан Бирманчевић; born 1969) is a politician in Serbia. He has served in the National Assembly of Serbia on a mostly continuous basis since 2014 as a member of the Serbian Progressive Party.

== Early life and career ==
Birmančević was born in Šabac, in what was then the Socialist Republic of Serbia in the Socialist Federal Republic of Yugoslavia. A graduated economist, he was appointed as a commissioner on the Progressive Party's city board in Šabac in May 2017.

== Politician ==
=== Parliamentarian ===
Birmančević received the 113th position on the Progressive Party's Aleksandar Vučić — Future We Believe In electoral list in the 2014 Serbian parliamentary election and was elected when the list won a landslide victory with 158 out of 250 seats. He was given the 143rd position in the 2016 election and, as the Progressive-led list won 131 seats, was not initially re-elected. He received a new mandate on 21 October 2017 as a replacement for another candidate higher on the list who had resigned. During the 2016–20 parliament, he was a deputy member of the defence and internal affairs committee and the agriculture, forestry, and water management committee.

He received the ninety-fifth position on the Progressive Party's Aleksandar Vučić — For Our Children list in the 2020 election and was elected to a third term when the list won a landslide majority with 188 mandates. He is now a member of the committee on finance, state budget, and control of public spending, a deputy member of the defence committee and the committee on Kosovo-Metohija, and a member of Serbia's parliamentary friendship groups with Angola, Argentina, Armenia, Australia, Austria, the Bahamas, Bahrain, Belarus, Bosnia and Herzegovina, Botswana, Brazil, Cameroon, Canada, the Central African Republic, China, Comoros, Croatia, Cuba, Cyprus, the Czech Republic, the Democratic Republic of the Congo, Egypt, France, Georgia, Germany, Greece, Hungary, the Dominican Republic, Ecuador, Equatorial Guinea, Eritrea, Grenada, Guinea-Bissau, India, Indonesia, Israel, Italy, Jamaica, Japan, Kazakhstan, Kyrgyzstan, Laos, Latvia, Liberia, Madagascar, Mali, Mauritius, Mexico, Moldova, Montenegro, Morocco, Mozambique, Nauru, the Netherlands, Nicaragua, Nigeria, North Macedonia, Norway, Palau, Papua New Guinea, Paraguay, the Philippines, Poland, Portugal, Qatar, the Republic of Congo, Romania, Russia, Saint Vincent and the Grenadines, Sao Tome and Principe, the Solomon Islands, Slovakia, Slovenia, South Africa, South Korea, South Sudan, Spain, Sri Lanka, Sudan, Suriname, Sweden, Switzerland, Togo, Trinidad and Tobago, Tunisia, Turkey, Ukraine, the United Arab Emirates, Uruguay, Uzbekistan, Zambia, and Zimbabwe.

=== Municipal politics ===
Birmančević is also a member of the Šabac city assembly. He received the third position on the party's list in the 2020 Serbian local elections and was returned when the list won a majority victory with thirty-seven out of sixty-nine mandates.
