= Golden Gate Biosphere Network =

Coalition of agencies and organizations

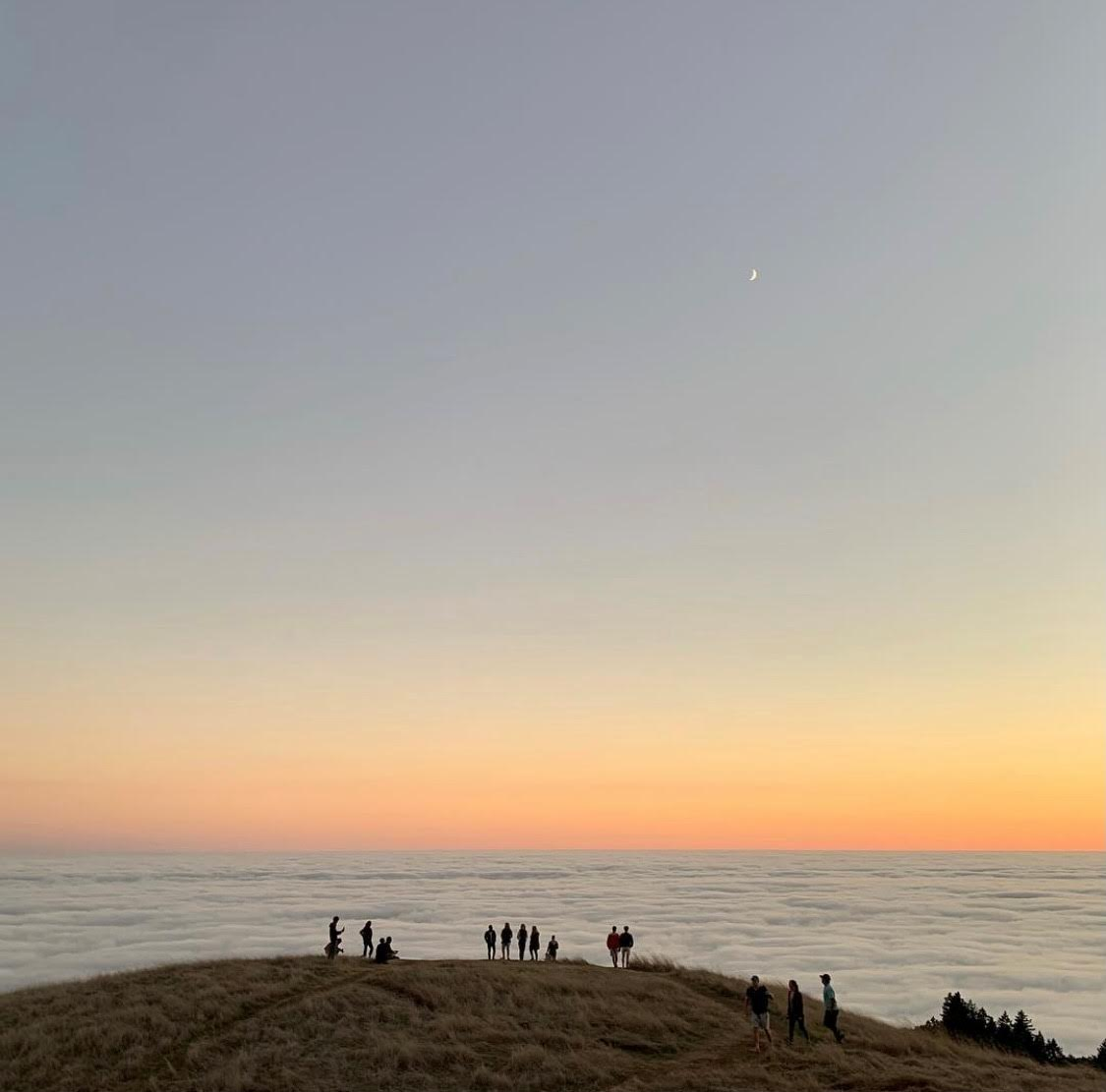
- Visitors enjoying the sunset atop Mount Tamalpais, a protected region within the Golden Gate Biosphere Network.

- Location within California Location within the United States
- Nearest city: San Francisco
- Coordinates: 37.8°N 122.5°W
- Area: 27,976 sq mi (72,460 km^{2})
- Established: 1988
- Governing body: UNESCO
- Website: Golden Gate Biosphere

The Golden Gate Biosphere Network (GGBN or the Network) is a voluntary coalition of federal, state and local government agencies, nonprofit organizations, universities, and private partners within the Golden Gate Biosphere region (along the western portion of the San Francisco Bay Area). The Network aims to protect the region's biodiversity and conserve its natural resources. The Network has been part of the UNESCO Man and Biosphere Programme since 1988.GGBN is also part of the US Biosphere Network as well as EuroMAB. It is recognized by UNESCO for its "significance for biological diversity conversation" and organizational efforts involving municipal authorities and private interests.

The Network periodically submits reports to UNESCO on current land-management issues related to the region's biodiversity and its connection to people. Recent efforts have focused on outreach to potential collaborators and promoting research on biodiversity and climate change adaptation.

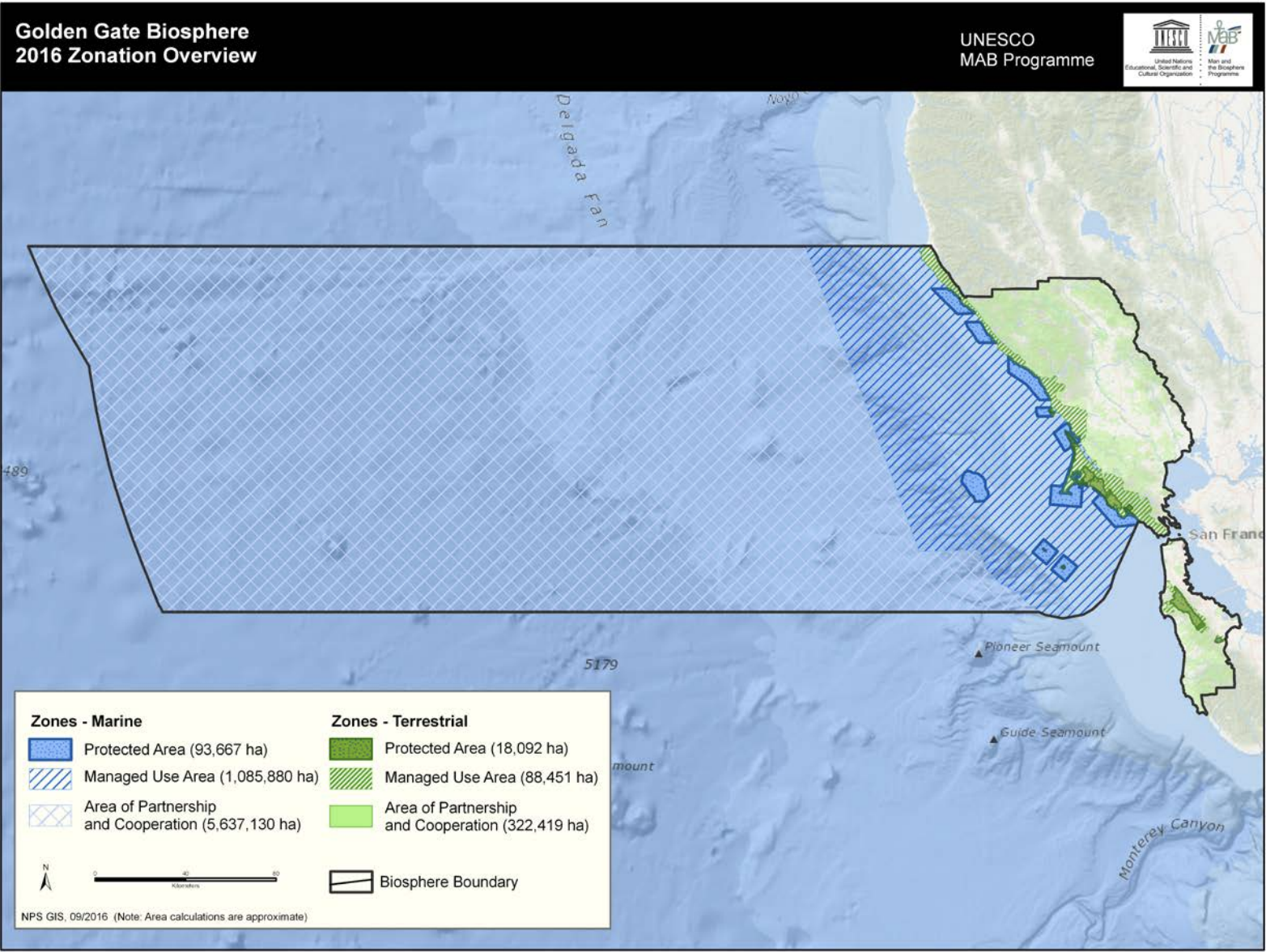
Map of Golden Gate Biosphere zones

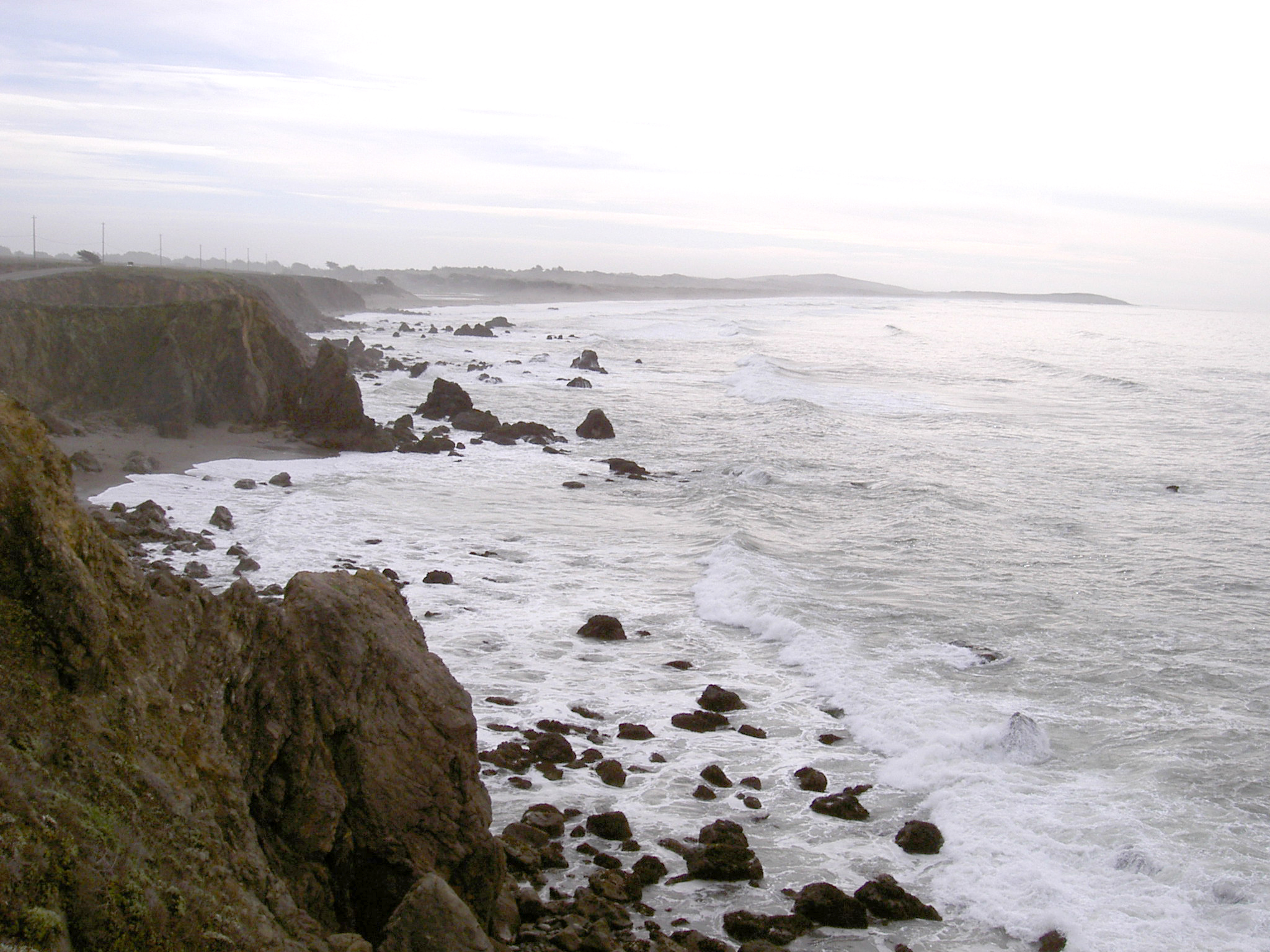
A protected area in Bodega Head State Marine Reserve

== About the Golden Gate Biosphere Network ==
The Golden Gate Biosphere network is a coalition with the goal of conserving the environment of the San Francisco Bay Area. It was recognized by UNESCO in 1988 for ecological and cultural diversity. In 2017, a periodic review brought renewed interest to the Golden Gate Biosphere Network and also expanded the boundaries of the GGB region by more than 26,000 square miles. Since 2017, the Network has focused on expanding its collaborative partnerships to improve connections among regional agencies, organizations, and nonprofits, enhancing the stewardship of natural resources. As of 2021, the Network is made up of 20 partners representing multiple jurisdictions and sectors of the region. These include:

1. Audubon Canyon Ranch
2. UC Davis, Bodega Marine Reserve
3. Jasper Ridge Biological Preserve
4. Cordell Bank National Marine Sanctuary
5. Greater Farallones National Marine Sanctuary
6. Farallon Islands National Wildlife Refuge
7. Golden Gate National Recreation Area
8. Fort Point National Historic Site
9. Muir Woods National Monument
10. Point Reyes National Seashore
11. Marin Municipal Water District
12. Mount Tamalpais State Park
13. Samuel P. Taylor State Park
14. Tomales Bay State Park
15. Pepperwood Preserve
16. Presidio Trust
17. San Francisco Public Utilities Commission Peninsula Watershed
18. Golden Gate National Parks Conservancy
19. Point Blue Conservation
20. National Park Service Regional Office (Interior Regions 8, 9, 10, 12)

== Biosphere Regions ==
As recognized by the UNESCO Man and the Biosphere Programme, there are currently 738 biosphere regions in 134 countries around the world. Regions are recognized for containing a large variety of ecological systems representative of major biogeographic regions, significant biodiversity, and their ability to explore and demonstrate approaches to sustainable development at the regional scale.

Biosphere regions serve three functions: to foster relationships between humans and nature that allow for sustainable development, to contribute to the conservation of landscapes, ecosystems, and species of flora and fauna, and to provide support for research, monitoring, and education within the region.

== Golden Gate Biosphere Region Geography ==
The Golden Gate Biosphere region consists of 27,976 square miles (7,246,000 ha) of which 94% is marine habitat. This marine area covers 26,319 square miles (6,817,000 ha) whilst the terrestrial area covers 1,694 square miles (439,000 ha).

The Region extends through the North-Central California coastal region from the Bodega Marine Reserve in the north to Jasper Ridge in the south and includes the Farallon Islands, Angel Island, and includes Alcatraz within the San Francisco Bay. The biosphere region is situated on both sides of the San Andreas Fault. Each side has a completely different type of bedrock, and the western side of the rift is moving northward.

Core areas, otherwise known as protected area, are legally constituted core areas devoted to long-term protection. The core areas of the Golden Gate Biosphere region are of sufficient size to serve the three functions required of biosphere regions mentioned previously. Marine protected areas within the biosphere include the following conservation units:

- Gualala (8,260 ha)
- Stewart's Point (6,227 ha)
- Jenner (11,955 ha)
- Bodega Head (2,431 ha)
- Tomales Point (6,393 ha)
- Cordell Bank Reef (10,374 ha)
- Point Reyes and Drakes Estero (12,932 ha)
- Duxbury Reef and Bolinas Lagoon (10,746 ha)
- North and South Farallon Islands (12,764 ha)

Terrestrial protected areas include the following conservation units:

- Bodega Marine Reserve (137 ha)
- Point Reyes National Seashore - Phillip Burton Wilderness (10,014 ha)
- Audubon Canyon Ranch (421 ha)
- Farallon National Wildlife Refuge (85 ha)
- San Francisco Peninsula Watershed (San Francisco Public Utilities Commission) (7,446 ha)
- Jasper Ridge Biological Preserve (413 ha)

In addition to these protected areas, the Golden Gate Biosphere region includes buffer zones and transition areas. Buffer zones, also known as managed use areas, are clearly identified and surrounding or contiguous to the core area or areas, where only activities compatible with conservation objectives and sound ecological practices can take place. These areas help reinforce scientific research, monitoring, training, and education. Transition areas, or areas of partnership and cooperation, are outer areas where the greatest activity is allowed. Sustainable resource management practices are promoted and developed in these areas in an effort to foster sociologically, culturally and ecologically sustainable economic and human development.

== Ecology ==
The biosphere is considered a biodiversity hotspot, as human habitation threatens its high biodiversity. With over 3000 terrestrial and marine plant and animal species, the Golden Gate Biosphere includes marine, aquatic ecosystems and terrestrial ecosystems such as evergreen forests (including the endemic Coast Redwood), oak woodlands, chaparral, coastal scrub and prairies, rare serpentine grasslands, as well as coastal and offshore islands. It also contains four Ramsar Wetlands of international importance: the Laguna de Santa Rosa Wetland Complex, Tomales Bay, Bolinas Lagoon, and San Francisco Bay Estuary. These habitats are threatened by human activities and settlement within the region.

A diverse range of marine, coastal, and upland habitats of the California chaparral and woodlands and Northern California coastal forests ecoregions may be found, including mixed evergreen forests, Coast Redwood forests, Douglas-fir forests, Bishop pine forests, oak forests, woodlands and savannas, northern coastal scrub, chaparral, coastal dune, coastal strand, tidepools, kelp forests, coastal grasslands, and marshes. The associated fauna is also rich with cougars, Tule elk, California sea lions, elephant seals, and many shorebirds.

Under the Endangered Species Act of 1973, the Bay Area is home to over 90 endangered or threatened animal and plant species. Endangered land animals found here include the California red-legged frog, Alameda whipsnake, California tiger salamander. Endangered fish include Central California Coast steelhead trout, coho salmon, and southern green sturgeon. Endangered birds and butterflies include the Western snowy plover, Brown pelican, Mission blue butterfly, and Bay checkerspot butterfly. Endangered plants include the Contra Costa goldfields, Suisun thistle, yellow larkspur, San Francisco Wallflower, and Clarkia franciscana.

== Public Use ==
The Golden Gate Biosphere region is unique for having marine, coastal, and upland resources adjacent to a major metropolitan area, thus providing easy access to outdoor education and recreation for the inhabitants of the San Francisco Bay metropolitan area.

The Biosphere region provides important economic opportunities to the San Francisco Bay Area and annually receives 26.5 million visitors. Many recreational activities such as sport fishing, hiking, bicycling, whale watching, sightseeing, backpacking, picnicking, kayaking, surfing, boating, swimming, scuba-diving, snorkeling, cultural activities, museums, dining, and overnight lodging are available.

Agricultural activities within the GGB region are limited to beef and dairy ranching within Point Reyes National Seashore and the northern district of Golden Gate National Recreation Area. Approximately 28,000 acres of land are permitted for ranching. The National Park Service and ranchers collaborate on issues of importance to maintaining biodiversity within the biosphere, including water quality, archaeological site preservation, ranch diversification, weed management, historic structure and landscape maintenance, sustainable agricultural practices, and habitat restoration.

== Stewardship and Research ==
The GGBN works collaboratively on projects related to stewardship, science, and education. Partners cooperate on tidal pool monitoring and public education in the area of Mount Tamalpais State Park. Another joint activity is the Coho salmon restoration project, which requires habitat inventorying and mapping of several critical watersheds. Within the last decade, collaborative projects within the 1,492 acres of the Presidio site involved the removal of six landfills. Those locations were subsequently restored with native habitats including one creek, three dune systems, one riparian system, two serpentine sites, and one Colma site, leading to increased habitats and populations of the endangered species San Francisco Lessingia and Franciscan Clarkia.

The Network also cooperates with the Iroise Biosphere Reserve of France in a comparison of coastal ecosystem recovery after human use changes. Research covers topics such as: the management of commercially important resources such as fisheries; threats to ecosystems such as oil spills, pollutants, and invasive species; and episodic events such as wildfires and climate extremes.

== Gallery ==
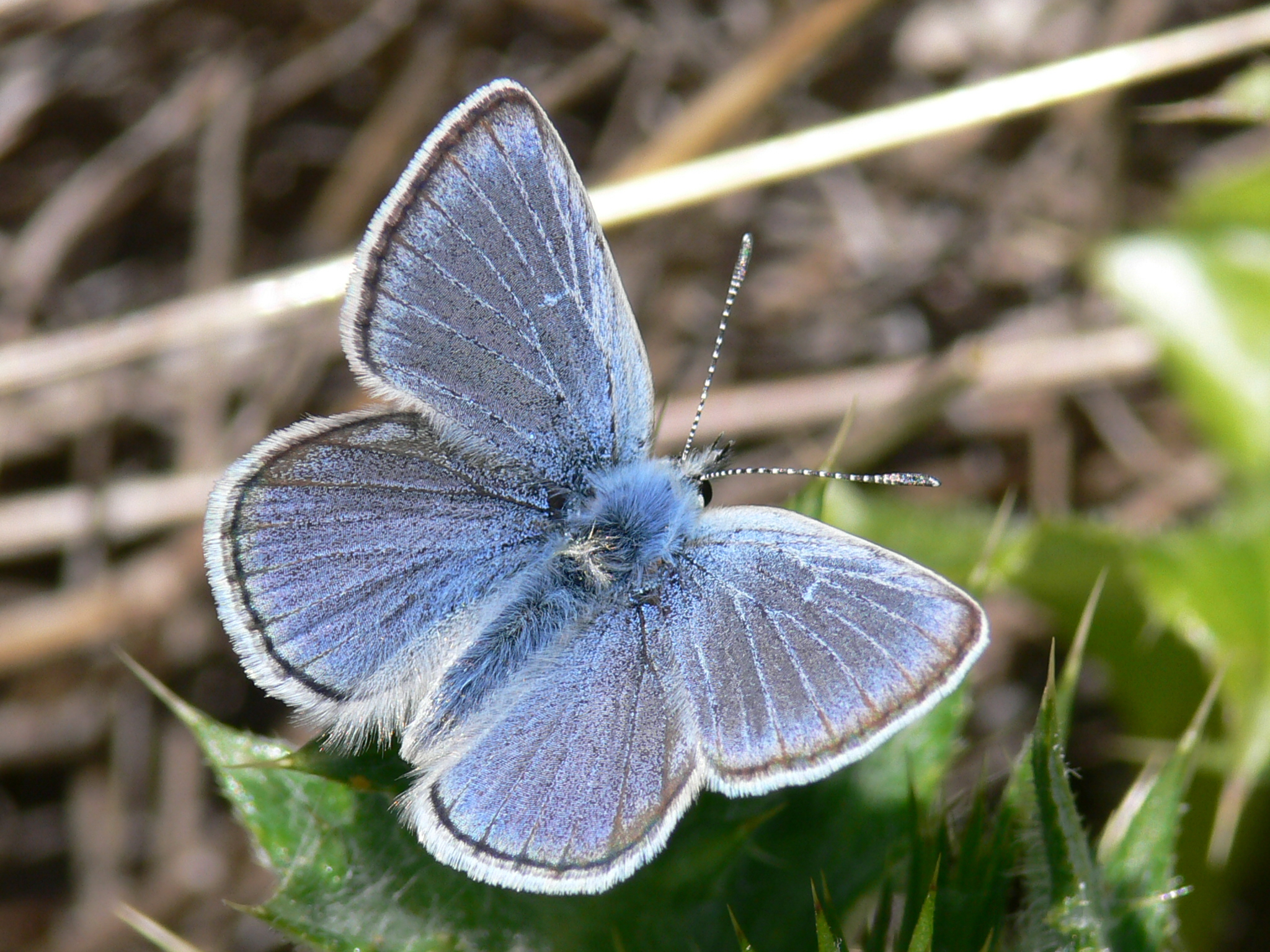
The endangered Mission blue butterfly found in Marin Headlands

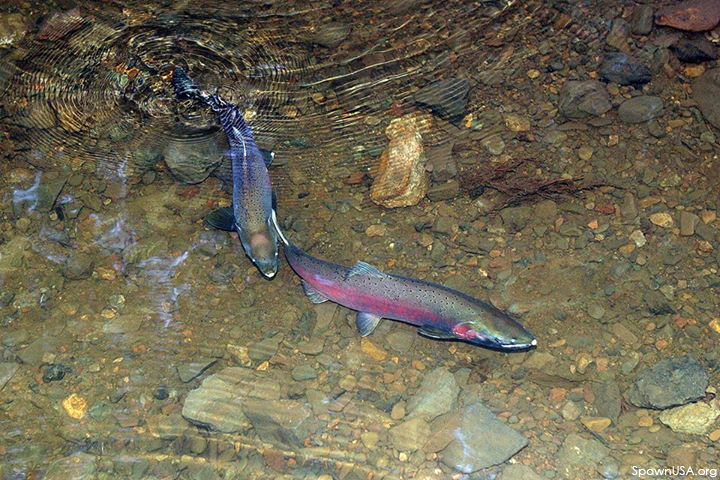
Coho salmon are threatened by rising sea temperatures and poor stream conditions

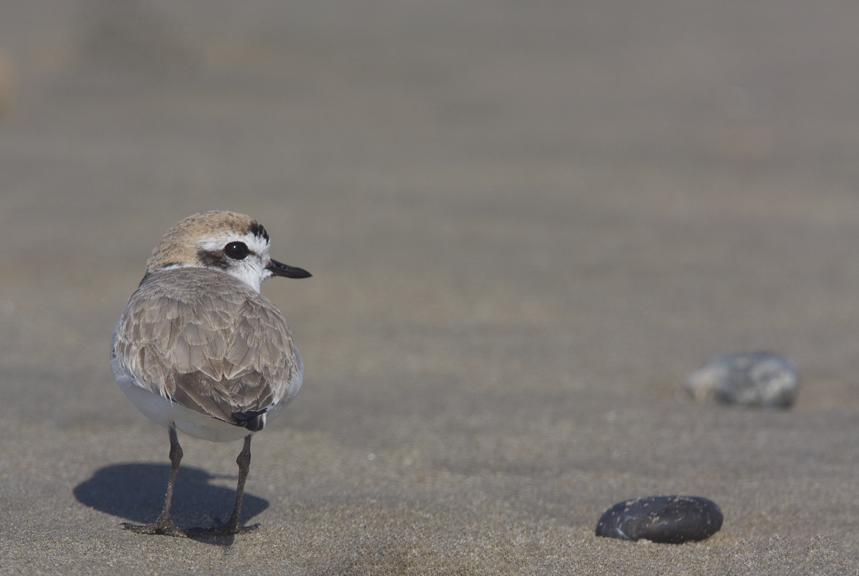
The Western snowy plover populations are closely monitored by researchers

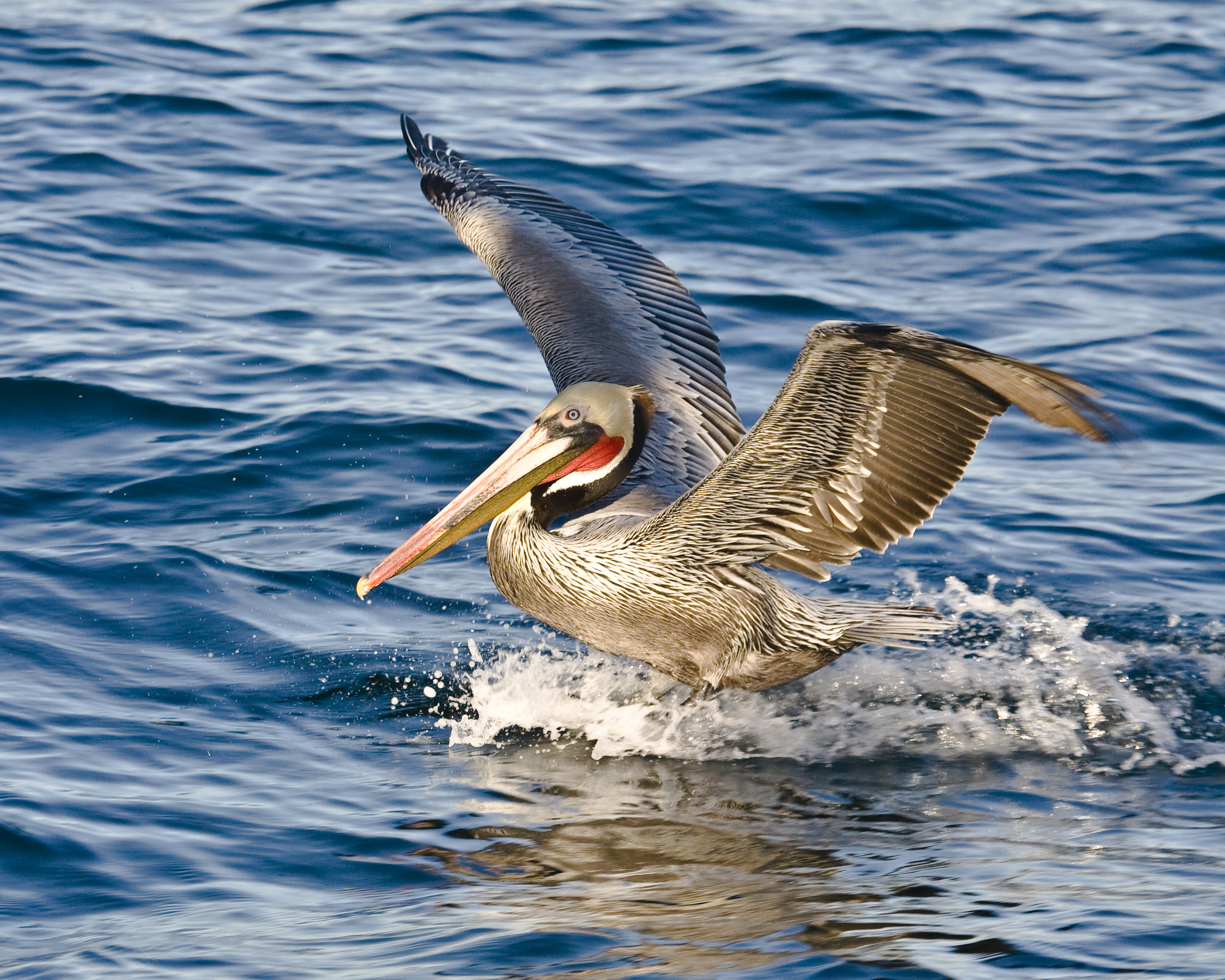
The endangered brown pelican lives on the coasts of the Golden Gate Biosphere

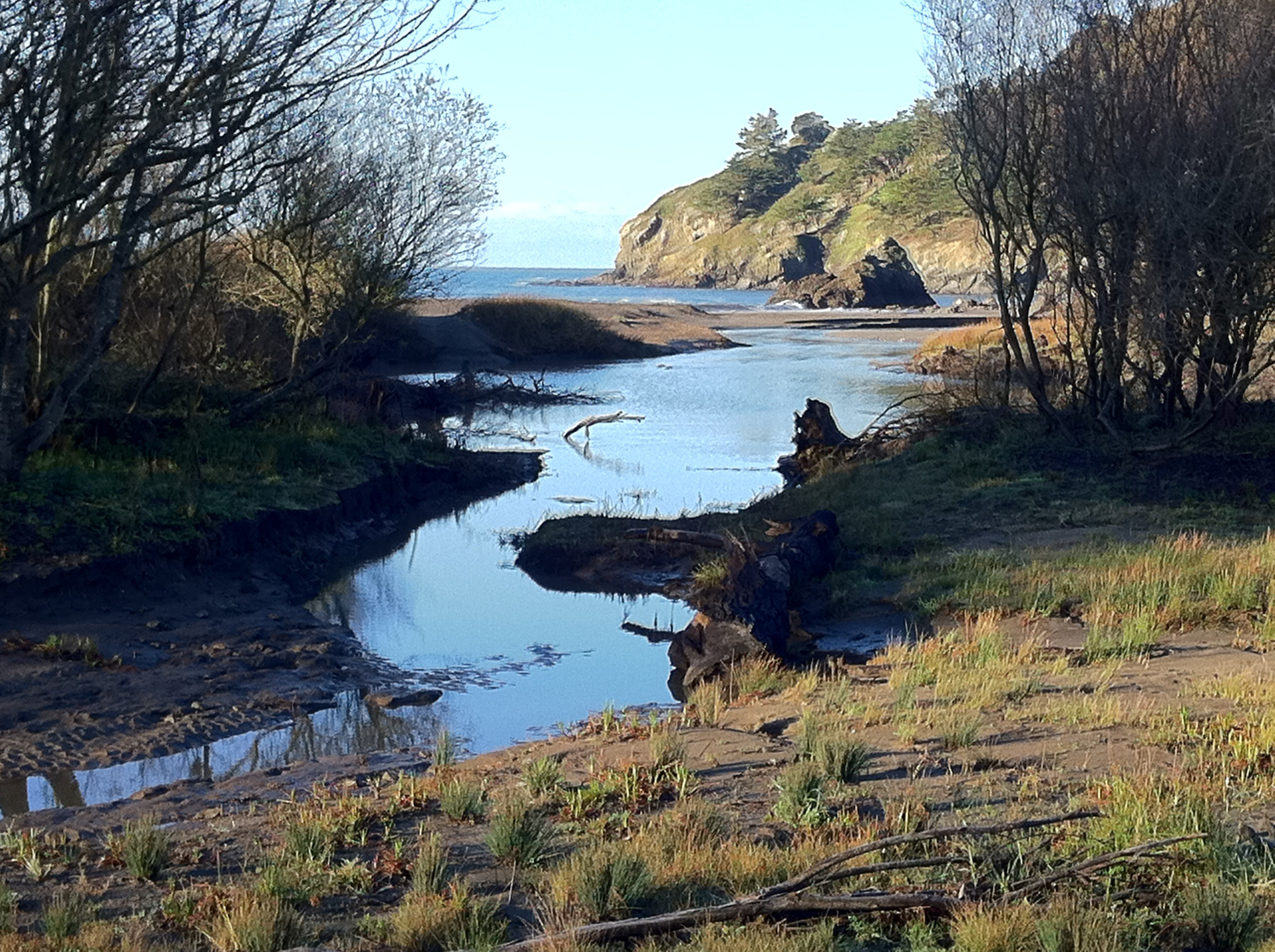
Redwood Creek supplies water to the Redwood trees of Muir Woods National Monument

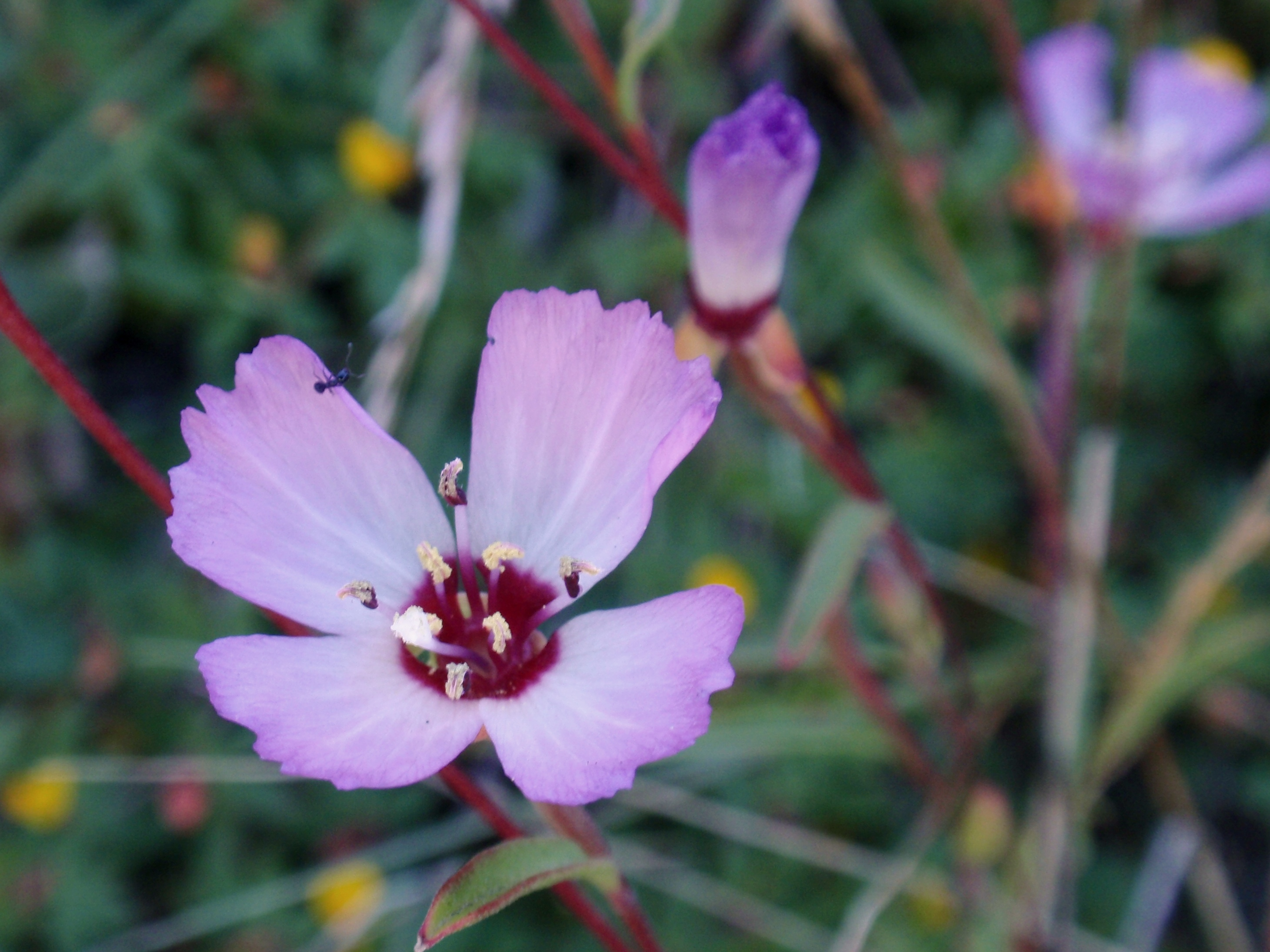
Rare Clarkia franciscana plants can be found in Presidio Park, San Francisco

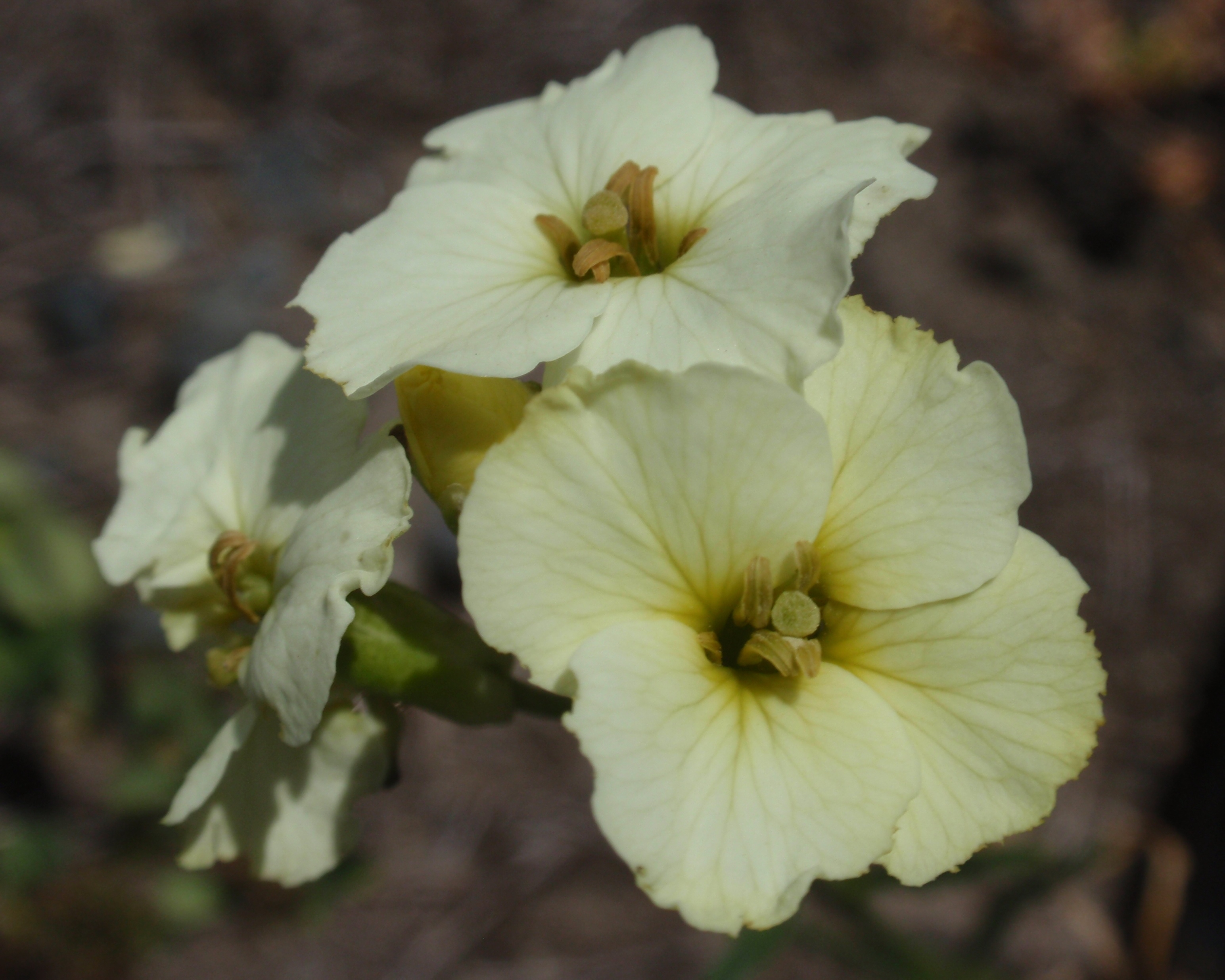
The San Francisco wallflower is a rare perennial plant found in dune habitats

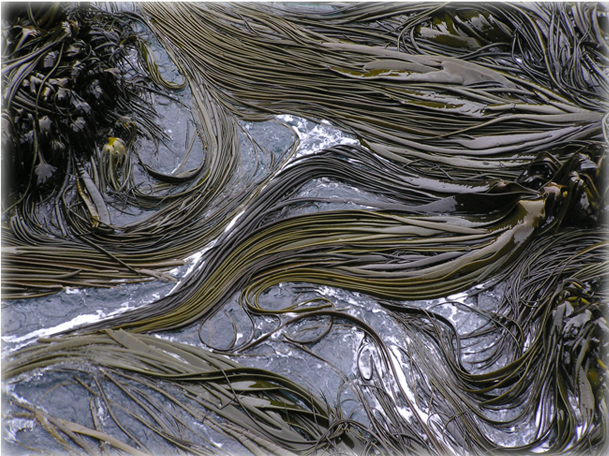
Bull kelp beds are an important habitat for marine wildlife in Duxbury Reef

== Sources ==
This article incorporates text from a free content work (license statement/permission). Text taken from UNESCO - MAB Biosphere Reserves Directory, UNESCO, UNESCO.
