= United States National System of Marine Protected Areas =

National System of Marine Protected Areas of the United States

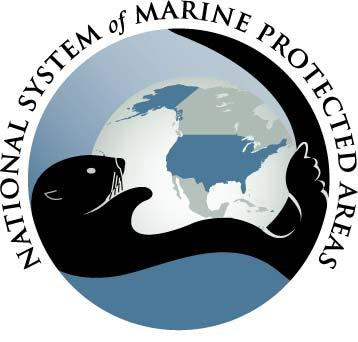
- Abbreviation: NSMPAUS
- Formation: April 2009
- Type: National initiative
- Purpose: Strengthen the protection of U.S. ocean, coastal, and Great Lakes resources through the coordination of existing marine protected areas (MPAs)
- Location: United States
- Region served: Nationwide
- Members: Federal, state, territorial, tribal, and local governments
- Official language: English
- Website: marineprotectedareas.noaa.gov

The National System of Marine Protected Areas of the United States is a national initiative designed to strengthen the protection of U.S. ocean, coastal, and Great Lakes resources through the coordination of existing marine protected areas (MPAs). The national system of MPAs consists of the group of MPA sites, networks, and systems established and managed by federal, state, territorial, tribal and/or local governments that collectively enhance conservation of the nation's marine heritage and represent its diverse ecosystems and resources. Although managed independently, national system MPAs work together at the regional and national levels to achieve common objectives for conserving the nation's important natural and cultural resources. The national system does not bring state, territorial or local sites under federal authority, nor does it restrict or change the management of any MPA.

== History ==
In 1981 Olympic National Park became a marine protected area. The total protected area is 3,697 square kilometres (1,427 sq mi). 173.2 km^{2} of the area was an MPA.

President Bill Clinton issued Executive Order 13158 in May 2000 for “strengthening the management, protection, and conservation of existing marine protected areas (MPA) and establishment of new or expanded MPAs; the development of a scientifically based, comprehensive national system of MPAs representing diverse U.S. marine ecosystems and the Nation's natural and cultural resources; and the avoiding causing harm to MPAs through federally conducted, approved, or funded activities.”

President George W. Bush issued Presidential proclamation 8031 on June 15, 2006 establishing Papahānaumokuākea Marine National Monument.

In April 2009, the US established a United States National System of Marine Protected Areas to strengthen the protection of US ocean, coastal and Great Lakes resources. These large-scale MPAs attempted to balance "the interests of conservationists, fishers, and the public." As of 2009, 225 MPAs participated in the national system. Sites work together toward common national and regional conservation goals and priorities. NOAA's national marine protected areas center maintains a comprehensive inventory of all 1,600+ MPAs within the US exclusive economic zone. Most US MPAs.allow some type of extractive use. Fewer than 1% of U.S. waters prohibit all extractive activities.

President Barack Obama signed a proclamation on September 25, 2014, expanding the existing Pacific Remote Islands Marine National Monument, one of the world's most pristine tropical marine environments, to six times its current size, encompassing 490,000 square miles (1,300,000 km^{2}) of protected area around these islands. Expanding the Monument protected the area's unique deep coral reefs and seamounts. In 2016 he expanded Papahānaumokuākea to encompass the entire Exclusive Economic Zone, covering 583,000 sq mi (1,510,000 km^{2}).

=== California ===
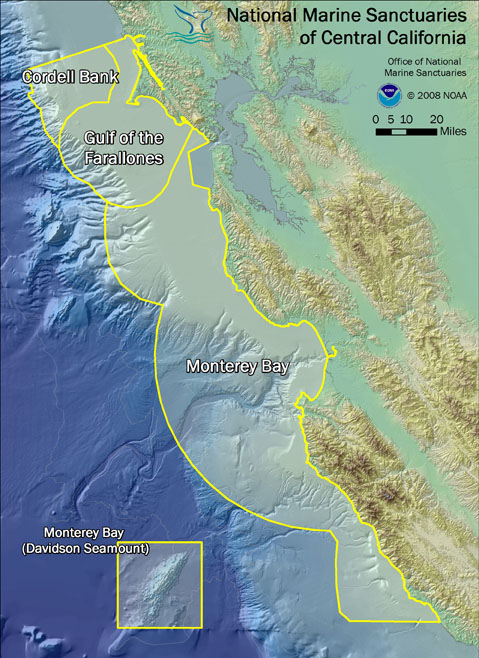
Diagram illustrating the orientation of three of the national marine sanctuaries of Central California: Cordell Bank, Gulf of the Farallones, and Monterey Bay. Davidson Seamount, part of the Monterey Bay sanctuary, is indicated at bottom left. A fourth sanctuary, the Chumash Heritage National Marine Sanctuary, was designated in 2024.

In 1999, California adopted the Marine Life Protection Act, the first state law requiring a comprehensive, science-based MPA network. The state created the Marine Life Protection Act Initiative. MLPA established a plan to create California's statewide MPA network by 2011. The Central Coast step was completed in September, 2007. The North Central Coast step was completed in 2010. The South Coast and North Coast steps were expected to go into effect in 2012.

== Background ==
MPAs have been created by a mix of federal, state, and local legislation, voter initiatives, and regulations, each established for its own specific purpose. As a result, the nation's collection of MPAs (e.g., reserves, refuges, preserves, sanctuaries, areas of special biological significance, and others) is fragmented, complex, confusing, and potentially missing opportunities for broader regional conservation through coordinated planning and management. In 2000, a broad coalition of scientists petitioned the White House to create a national system of MPAs to improve conservation of the nation's marine ecosystems, cultural resources, and fisheries. Presidential Executive Order 13158 was signed by President Bill Clinton on May 26, 2000, directing the Department of Commerce to work with the Department of the Interior, other federal agencies, states, territories, tribes and stakeholders to establish a national system of MPAs to integrate and enhance the nation's MPAs, bringing these diverse sites and programs together to work on common conservation objectives.

MPAs protect ecosystems and resources such as coral reefs, kelp forests, shipwrecks, and those areas frequented by whales and other marine life. They also can provide protection to economically valuable coastal and marine resources including commercial and recreational fisheries. The national system includes MPAs throughout the marine environment of the U.S. and its territories, including coastal areas, estuaries, oceans and the Great Lakes. As a first step in developing the national system of MPAs, the MPA Center compiled an MPA Inventory of all MPAs in U.S. waters. The U.S. has over 1,600 MPAs, ranging from typically small fully protected marine reserves where extractive uses are prohibited to large, multiple-use areas where fishing, diving and other uses are permitted. Most MPAs in U.S. waters allow some type of extractive use, with less than 1% of U.S. waters fully protected marine reserves where extractive activities are not permitted.

The national system is described in detail in the Framework for a National System of Marine Protected Areas of the United States of America.

Cartoonist Jim Toomey and National Oceanic and Atmospheric Administration (NOAA) Administrator Jane Lubchenco unveil the poster Toomey designed for the NOAA Marine Protected Areas Center in 2009.

In April 2009 the National System of Marine Protected Areas was officially established with the acceptance of the first 225 charter sites. A second nomination process was held in the fall of 2009, and additional sites will be admitted to the system in 2010 on an annual basis thereafter. The nomination process is transparent, science-based, and provides an opportunity for public comment.

The national system of MPAs provides the first comprehensive mechanism for coordinating MPAs managed by diverse federal, state, territorial, tribal and local agencies to work toward national conservation objectives. The system will benefit the nation's collective conservation efforts and participating MPAs, providing those sites with a means to address issues beyond their boundaries. Examples of some of these benefits include:

- Enhanced stewardship through better coordination, public awareness and enhanced site management capacity
- Building partnerships for MPAs to work together toward common conservation objectives
- Increased support for marine conservation through the recognition provided by the national system
- Protecting representative ecosystems and resources from all the nation's ecosystem and habitat types
- Identifying gaps in current protection of ocean resources to help inform future MPA planning
- Transparent process for MPA planning that is science-*based and includes a commitment to balanced stakeholder involvement.

== See also ==
- List of marine protected areas of California
