= Ellenshaw =

Ellenshaw is a surname. Notable people with the surname include:

- Harrison Ellenshaw (born 1945), American matte painter
- Peter Ellenshaw (1913–2007), English matte designer and special effects creator, father of Harrison
