= Milan Schere =

Canadian matte painter and filmmaker (born 1983)

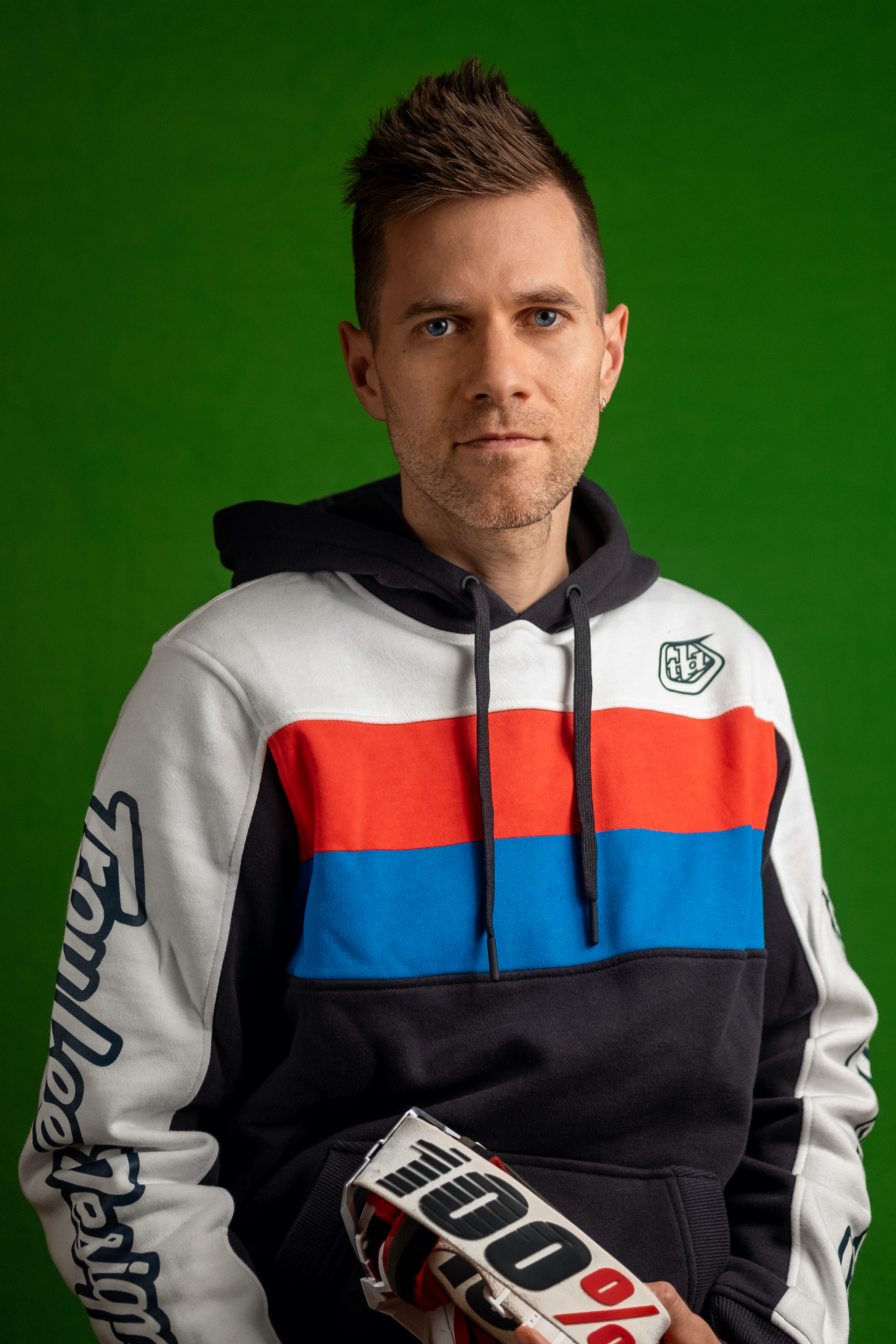
- Canadian digital matte artist Milan Schere
- Born: Milan Schere; Canada
- Years active: 2007-Current
- Spouse: Seema Schere
- Awards: Genie 2011

Milan Schere is a Canadian matte painter and filmmaker, best known for his work on Tron: Legacy. In 2011 he received a best Visual Effects in Canadian cinema award nomination by the Academy of Canadian Cinema and Television for his 1907 New York City skyline period matte painting work in the feature film A Dangerous Method.

== Career ==
Before becoming a visual effects artist, Schere earned a master's degree in Digital Effects from Bournemouth University, England. He remained in England, working in broadcast design on a number of popular BBC documentaries and the motion picture Dredd.

He has overall had a great influence on the matte painting community as he was on the forefront of camera projection mapping and one of the first digital matte artists to implement the 3D texturing tool Mari into the digital environment creation process.

Schere co-authored the book D'artiste Matte Painting 3: Digital Artists Master Class in which he shares of his work process and industry experiences throughout his career. He has also published papers on the subject of matte painting. Interviews of Schere have been featured in multiple media and print publications such as Cinefex and the American Cinematographer for his work on Get On Up.

His filmography includes Scott Pilgrim vs. the World, The Twilight Saga: Breaking Dawn – Part 1, RoboCop, The Shape of Water, Greenland and The Addams Family 2. In addition to his feature film work, he is also known to fans of the television series Vikings for the numerous digital backdrops he created.

Besides his matte painting experience as an artist, Schere has directed a number of commercials, music videos and short films. He has worked as visual effects supervisor on development projects and obtained a credit as digital effects supervisor on the Apple TV+ series Shantaram.

Today, Schere is the Head of Environments at award-winning visual effects studio DNEG contributing to projects such as The Last of Us, Dune: Part Two and Mickey 17. The company, formerly known as Double Negative VFX, has received seven Academy Awards for its work on Inception, Interstellar, Ex Machina, Blade Runner 2049, First Man, Tenet and Dune.

== Awards ==
- Canadian Screen Awards for Best Achievement in Visual Effects for A Dangerous Method (2011)
- Canadian Screen Awards for Best Achievement in Visual Effects for Resident Evil: Retribution (2012)

== Partial filmography ==
- Mickey 17 (2025)
- Lift (2024)
- Dune: Part Two (2024)
- Haunted Mansion (2023)
- Shazam! Fury of the Gods (2023)
- Bullet Train (2022)
- Redeeming Love (2022)
- The Addams Family 2 (2021)
- The Water Man (2020)
- Greenland (2020)
- The Hunt (2020)
- Midway (2019)
- The Silence (2019)
- Goalie (2019)
- The Lie (2018)
- The Shape of Water (2017)
- American Made (2017)
- Resident Evil: The Final Chapter (2016)
- Legends of the Hidden Temple (2016)
- Sully (2016)
- Ben-Hur (2016)
- Zoolander 2 (2016)
- Ride Along 2 (2016)
- Crimson Peak (2015)
- The Dovekeepers (2015)
- Get on Up (2014)
- Noah (2014)
- Pompeii (2014)
- Endless Love (2014)
- RoboCop (2014)
- Carrie (2013)
- The Mortal Instruments: City of Bones (2013)
- 42 (2013)
- Mama (2013)
- Silent Hill: Revelation (2012)
- Resident Evil: Retribution (2012)
- Dredd (2012)
- The Vow (2012)
- The Twilight Saga: Breaking Dawn - Part 1 (2011)
- The Thing (2011)
- A Dangerous Method (2011)
- The Three Musketeers (2011)
- Hanna (2011)
- TRON: Legacy (2010)

== See also ==
- Dylan Cole
- Christopher Leith Evans
- Michael Pangrazio
- Digital matte artist
- Matte painting
- The Foundry
- Camera projection mapping
