= Matte painting =

Film making technique

The military warehouse at the end of Raiders of the Lost Ark (1981) was painted on glass by Michael Pangrazio at Industrial Light & Magic, and combined with live-action footage of a worker pushing his cargo up the center aisle.

A matte painting is a painted representation of a landscape, set, or distant location that allows filmmakers to create the illusion of an environment that is not present at the filming location. Historically, matte painters and film technicians have used various techniques to combine a matte-painted image with live-action footage (compositing). At its best, depending on the skill levels of the artists and technicians, the effect is seamless and creates environments that would otherwise be impossible or expensive to film. In the scenes, the painting part is static while movements are integrated on it.

== Background ==
Missions of California, a 1907 documentary by Norman Dawn, was the first film to use a glass matte painting to augment the scenery.

=== Norman Dawn ===
Norman Dawn was born on 25 May 1884 in Argentina and was a director and writer. He died in Santa Monica, California, US, on 2 February 1975. He was significant in early special effects cinematography as well as being an inventor, artist, director, writer, and producer.

=== History of the craft ===
Traditionally, matte paintings were made by artists using paints or pastels on large sheets of glass for integrating with the live-action footage. The first known matte painting shot was made in 1907 by Norman Dawn (ASC), who improvised the crumbling California Missions by painting them on glass for the movie Missions of California. Notable traditional matte-painting shots include Dorothy's approach to the Emerald City in The Wizard of Oz (1939), Charles Foster Kane's Xanadu in Citizen Kane (1941) and the seemingly bottomless tractor-beam set of Star Wars Episode IV: A New Hope (1977). The documentary The Making of Star Wars mentioned the technique used for the tractor beam scene as being a glass painting.

By the mid-1980s, advancements in computer graphics programs allowed matte painters to work in the digital realm. The first digital matte shot was created by painter Chris Evans for Young Sherlock Holmes (1985) for a scene featuring a computer-graphics (CG) animation of a knight leaping from a stained-glass window. Evans first painted the window in acrylics, then scanned the painting into LucasFilm's Pixar system for further digital manipulation. The computer animation (another first) blended perfectly with the digital matte, which could not have been accomplished using a traditional matte painting.

== From traditional to digital ==
Traditional matte painting is older than the movie camera itself and has been already practiced in the early years of photography to create painted elements in photographs. With the advantages of the digital age, matte painters have slowly transitioned to a digital work environment, using pressure-sensitive pens and graphic tablets in conjunction with painting software such as Adobe Photoshop. A digital matte painter is part of a visual effects team being involved in post-production, as opposed to a traditional matte painter, who was a special effects crew, often creating matte paintings on set to be used as backdrops.

Throughout the 1990s, traditional matte paintings were still in use, but more often in conjunction with digital compositing. Die Hard 2 (1990) was the first film to use digitally composited live-action footage with a traditional glass matte painting that had been photographed and scanned into a computer. It was for the last scene, which took place on an airport runway. By the end of the decade, the time of hand-painted matte paintings was drawing to a close, although as late as the late 1990s some traditional paintings were still being made, notably Chris Evans’ painting of the RMS Carpathia rescue ship in James Cameron’s Titanic (1997).

One particular drawback to the work of the digital matte artist is an occasional tendency of their output to look too realistic, which traditional artists avoided by using impressionistic elements or by suggesting details. What this means is that digital matte art is often characterized by an artificially perfect look. One of the modern approaches adopted to address this is the integration of details from a photograph, say, of real places to depict realistic scenes. It is this reason why some digital matte artists refer to their work as a combination of digital painting, photo manipulation, and 3D, for the purpose of creating virtual sets that are hard or impossible to find in the real world.

Paint was superseded in the 21st century by digital images created using photo references, 3-D models, and drawing tablets. Matte painters combine their digitally matte painted textures within computer-generated 3-D environments, allowing for 3-D camera movement. Lighting algorithms used to simulate lighting sources expanded in scope in 1995, when radiosity rendering was applied to film for the first time in Martin Scorsese's Casino (1995). Matte World Digital collaborated with LightScape to simulate the indirect bounce-light effect of millions of neon lights of the 1970s-era Las Vegas strip. Lower computer processing times continue to alter and expand matte painting technologies and techniques. Matte painting techniques are also implemented in concept art and used often in games and even high end production techniques in animation.

== Digital matte artists ==
A digital matte artist, or digital matte painter (DMP), is today's modern form of a traditional matte painter in the entertainment industry. They digitally paint photo-realistic interior and exterior environments that could not have been otherwise created or visited. The term 'digital' is used to distinguish a DMP from a traditional matte painter. Craig Barron, the co-founder of Matte World Digital, offered an insight regarding the transition of the art from traditional to digital in the following words:

″It is difficult to categorize what a matte painting shot is today... Most filmmakers still call what we do matte shots, and we like that because we see our work as an extension of the original craft. But it's more accurate to say we are involved in environment creation.″

=== Workflow and skillset ===
The time period and extent of involvement of a digital matte artist in film production varies by the type of film and by the artist's supervisor's (film producer, film director, art director) intentions. However, there are artists such as Mathieu Raynault who stated that they are often brought into the production at a very early stage, providing sketches and concepts to get a dialogue started with the director or art director. Raynault was involved on films like 300 (2006), Star Wars: Episode II – Attack of the Clones (2002) and two Lord of the Rings films (2001-2003), among others.

Because of the growing need for 'moving' mattes, camera projection mapping has been implemented into the matte painting timeline. Although ILM CG Supervisor Stefen Fangmeier came up with the idea of projecting Yusei Uesugi's aerial painting of Neverland onto a 3D mesh modeled by Geoff Campbell while working on the motion picture Hook (1991), projection-mapping based 3D environment matte art was until recently, like its predecessor matte painting has been, the industry's best-kept secret. The involvement of 3D in this until then 2D art form was revealed by Craig Barron in 1998 after completing their work on the feature film Great Expectations (2012) when they introduced this technique as a 2.5D matte to the public. In production today this combination of 2D and 3D is part of every matte artist's bread and butter.

Because of their high artistic skills, digital matte artists are often also involved with the creation of concept artwork.

== Notable uses ==
- The army barracks in All Quiet on the Western Front (1930).
- Count Dracula's castle exteriors in Dracula (1931) and other scenes.
- The view of Skull Island in King Kong (1933).
- Charlie Chaplin's blindfold roller-skating beside the illusory drop in Modern Times (1936).
- The view of Nottingham Castle in The Adventures of Robin Hood (1938).
- The spy thriller Saboteur (1942), directed by Alfred Hitchcock, is enhanced by numerous matte shots, ranging from a California aircraft factory to the climactic scene atop New York's Statue of Liberty.
- Black Narcissus (1947) by Powell and Pressburger, scenes of the Himalayan convent.
- Several external views and the 20 miles-a-side cube left by the Ancients in Forbidden Planet (1956).
- In Alfred Hitchcock's North by Northwest (1959) shots of The United Nations building, Mount Rushmore and the Mount Rushmore house.
- Extensive examples of matte painting can be found throughout the Biblical epic Ben-Hur (1959).
- The stone column demolished by the locomotive in the Chicago station in the film Silver Streak (1962).
- Birds flying over Bodega Bay, looking down at the town below, in Alfred Hitchcock's The Birds (1963).
- Mary Poppins gliding over London with her umbrella, the St Paul's Cathedral and London's rooftops and aerial views in Mary Poppins (1964).
- The iconic image of the Statue of Liberty at the end of Planet of the Apes (1968).
- Diabolik's underground lair and various locations in Danger: Diabolik (1968).
- Virtually all of the exterior shots of San Francisco in The Love Bug (1968).
- The rooftops of Portobello Road, the English landscape, Miss Price's house and other scenes in Bedknobs and Broomsticks (1971) (special effects won an Academy Award).
- The city railway line in The Sting (1973).
- Views of a destroyed Los Angeles in Earthquake (1974) for which Albert Whitlock won an Academy Award.
- The Death Star's laser tunnel in Star Wars (1977).
- The Starfleet headquarters in Star Trek The Motion Picture (1979).
- The background for all scenes featuring Imperial walkers in The Empire Strikes Back (1980).
- The final scene of the secret government warehouse in Steven Spielberg's Raiders of the Lost Ark (1981).
- The Roy and Deckard chase scene in Blade Runner (1982).
- The view of the crashed space ship in The Thing (1982).
- The view of the OCP tower in RoboCop (1987) and other scenes.
- Gotham City street scene in Batman (1989).
- The Bat Cave in Batman Returns (1992).
- The Karl G. Jansky Very Large Array in Contact (1997).
- The bunkhouse of the Furious Five and its surrounding background in Kung Fu Panda (2008).
- Virtually all of the backgrounds in The Amazing World of Gumball (2011)
- Wide angle hotel shot from Wes Anderson's The Grand Budapest Hotel (2014).
- The cityscape behind the Barnums' first apartment in The Greatest Showman (2017).
- The snowy mountain backgrounds of Jane Schoenbrun's Teenage Sex and Death at Camp Miasma (2026).

== Notable matte painters and technicians ==
- Dylan Cole
- Max Dennison
- Walter Percy Day
- Norman Dawn
- Linwood G. Dunn
- Harrison Ellenshaw
- Peter Ellenshaw
- Emilio Ruiz del Rio
- Michael Pangrazio
- Milan Schere
- Albert Whitlock
- Matthew Yuricich
- Chris Evans

== See also ==
- Camera projection mapping
- Bipack
- Chroma key
- Compositing
- Optical printing
- Video matting
- Paint sheen
- Cinemotography
- Cinematic techniques

== Bibliography ==
- Mark Cotta Vaz; Craig Barron (2002). The Invisible Art: The Legends of Movie Matte Painting. Chronicle Books. ISBN 0-8118-4515-X.
- Peter Ellenshaw; Ellenshaw Under Glass – Going to the Matte for Disney
- Richard Rickitt: Special Effects: The History and Technique. Billboard Books; 2nd edition, 2007; ISBN 0-8230-8408-6 (Chapter 5 covers the history and techniques of movie matte painting.)
- Barron, C., 1998. Matte Painting in the Digital Age. In: Invisible Effects. Siggraph 98: Proceedings of the 25th Annual Conference on Computer Graphics, July 23, 1998. Orlando, Florida, USA.
- Cotta Vaz, M., 2002. The invisible Art: The Legends of Movie Matte Painting. San Francisco, CA, USA: Chronicle Books.
- Uesugi, Y. et al., 2008. d'artiste Matte Painting 2. Adelaide, SA, AUS: Ballistic Publishing.
