= Point Blue Conservation Science =

US non-profit organization

- Type: 501(c)(3)
- Purpose: reduce impacts of climate change, habitat loss and other environmental stressors while promoting climate-smart, Nature Based Solutions for wildlife and people
- Headquarters: 3820 Cypress Drive #11; Petaluma, California
- Region served: Alaska to Antarctica
- Method: science, partnerships, outreach
- CEO: Manuel Oliva
- Budget: $10.2 million
- Employees: 140 staff and seasonal scientists
- Website: www.pointblue.org

Point Blue Conservation Science, founded as and formerly named the Point Reyes Bird Observatory (PRBO), is a California-based wildlife conservation and research non-profit organization.

== Overview ==
Point Blue was founded in 1965 to study bird migration along the Pacific Flyway. Point Blue has conducted the longest running population study of land birds in North America west of the Mississippi river (continuous since 1966) and has maintained a year-round research presence on the Farallon Islands since 1969.

Point Blue is headquartered in Petaluma, California, with several active field research stations and sites throughout California. Their field station in Bolinas offers environmental education and guided tours of the mist-netting process used to study birds, and seasonal interns are there all year learning about banding/studying birds. In June 2013, the organization changed its name to Point Blue Conservation Science.

== Initiatives ==
The organization's top priorities are to understand and project the effects of climate change and other environmental stressors on nature and wildlife in order to benefit birds, other wildlife and people.

In collaboration with Conserve.IO (EarthNC), Cordell Bank National Marine Sanctuary, Gulf of the Farallones National Marine Sanctuary and Channel Islands National Marine Sanctuary, Point Blue has developed the “Whale Aware” program, a new system for gathering near-real-time data on where whales are congregating so marine management agencies can alert ship operators and help prevent collisions with endangered whales in the San Francisco and Channel Islands regions.

== Personnel ==
Point Blue employs around 140 staff and seasonal biologists and around 14 education and outreach staff, who focus on scientific research, conservation biology, and outreach.
