= Christopher Leith Evans =

American painter

- Born: 1954 (age 71–72); Bremerton, Washington, U.S.
- Education: University of California, Los Angeles, BFA (1977), MFA (1980)
- Notable work: New York In the Light of Memory
- Movement: Realism
- Awards: Primetime Emmy (1985)
- Website: christopherleithevans.com

Christopher Leith Evans (born 1954), commonly credited as Christopher Evans or Chris Evans, is an American painter, matte artist, and visual effects art director for major motion pictures. Evans's paintings are characterized by a highly realistic representation of landscape, architecture, and the human figure. He has created more than 100 matte paintings for films such as E.T., Return of the Jedi, Star Trek II, III, and IV, as well as Titanic and The Curious Case of Benjamin Button. Evans was awarded a Primetime Emmy in 1985 for The Ewok Adventure and was nominated for an Academy Award in 1988 for Willow.

Before, during and after his career in film, Evans created many works of fine art and exhibited his work in several solo, group and public exhibitions. His first was in a 1980 group exhibition, "L.A. As Seen by L.A. Artists", at the Municipal Art Gallery in Los Angeles. New York In the Light of Memory, a 360-degree view of Manhattan from the South Tower of the World Trade Center prior to the September 11 attacks, was exhibited at New-York Historical Society. His work can also be found at the Duke University Museum of Art, Neuberger Museum of Art and Los Angeles Theatre Center.

== Early life ==
Christopher Leith Evans was born in 1954 in Bremerton, Washington, to Virginia Joan (née Bartholomew) and Alan Edward Evans. As a child, Evans was encouraged by his parents to express himself through drawing and painting. He grew up in Bay Shore, New York, and attended Bay Shore High School where he joined the staff of his high school newspaper, the Maroon Echo. He drew cartoons and caricatures, wrote and illustrated articles and took photographs for the newspaper. Evans graduated from high school in 1972. Inspired by a teacher, he began to focus his academic career on art, traveling to Europe at 17 years old, and viewing classical art in museums in Belgium, France, Spain, Italy, Germany and England.

While his family members supported his artistic endeavors as a youngster, when Evans applied to college he was encouraged to seek an education that would prepare him for a more practical career. He began classes at University of California, Los Angeles (UCLA) as an art history major, but continued to paint in his free time. When he showed his work to his art history professors, Evans was encouraged by one to change his major area of study to art. He changed majors in sophomore year and graduated summa cum laude and Phi Beta Kappa in 1977 with a Bachelor of Fine Arts in painting, sculpture and graphic arts. In 1979, he received a travel and study grant from the Ford Foundation and continued his studies to receive a Master of Fine Arts from UCLA in 1980. Evans was awarded an honorary doctorate from the Academy of Art College in San Francisco in 2000 and earned a grant from the Pollock-Krasner Foundation in 2006.

== Career ==
After graduate school, Evans pursued a career as a painter; he had a studio in a small garage in Los Angeles. In September 1980, in one of his earliest exhibitions, Evans was among a group of 30 artists featured at an exhibit, "L.A. As Seen by L.A. Artists", curated by Josine Starrels and presented at the Municipal Art Gallery in Los Angeles. The exhibit included two works by Evans; both were photorealistic oil paintings of an identical view of his red tile-roofed white stucco home − one in the morning light and the other in the late afternoon. Christopher Knight wrote for the Los Angeles Herald Examiner that Evans's work showed "acuity of observation" and "a remarkably fluent handling of paint".

Soon after, he watched the film The Empire Strikes Back (1980). Impressed by the film's portrayal of the Cloud City, he submitted samples of his work to George Lucas's company, Industrial Light & Magic (ILM), and was offered a position as an apprentice matte painter. Evans first project at ILM was on the 1981 film Dragonslayer for which he created about 20 background paintings. He not only served as an artist on projects but also as a consultant from the beginning of the project during script writing and advising the director and storyboard artist as production progressed. At ILM, Evans created more than 100 matte paintings for films such as E.T., The Dark Crystal, Star Trek II, Return of the Jedi, Indiana Jones and the Temple of Doom, Starman, The NeverEnding Story, Star Trek III, Enemy Mine, The Ewok Adventure, Ewoks II, Star Trek IV, Cocoon, and The Golden Child. Evans was awarded a Primetime Emmy Award for Outstanding Special Visual Effects in 1985 for his work on The Ewok Adventure and was nominated for an Academy Award for Best Visual Effects in 1988 for his work on Willow. He became the head of the matte painting department and remained at ILM until 1989.

In 1986 and 1987, Evans collaborated with theater director George Coates to create scenic projections for Actual Sho, a theatrical production that opened at Stuttgart, Germany, and was also presented at the Palace of Fine Arts in San Jose, California. Paul Hertelendy of the San Jose Mercury News particularly attributed the visual success of the production to Evans, Charles Rose and Jeff Hunt, who together are credited for the scenic and lighting projection design. The visuals included op art, computer art, trompe-l'œil, film projections, and "giant Rorschach patterns [that] bleed into vaguely biological images [and] produce clusters of petroglyphs".

After leaving ILM, Evans began working as a freelancer for companies such as Walt Disney Studios and National Geographic. He contributed historical recreations of anthropological sites for the National Geographic, including the IMAX film Lewis & Clark: Great Journey West. He worked for Matte World Digital as a digital matte painter and art director, contributing to several films including Titanic, The Green Mile and The Curious Case of Benjamin Button. Evans told Newsday in 2004 that a background painting of the RMS Carpathia he made for Titanic was the last oil painting used as matte for a feature film and a stained-glass window he created for Young Sherlock Holmes was the first computer generated image used as a background.

In 2001, Evans moved back to Bayshore and became interested in painters of the Hudson River School art movement with whom he says he shares "an awe and reverence for nature". His best known fine art work is New York In the Light of Memory, a panoramic representation of the view from the South Tower of the World Trade Center prior to the attacks on September 11, 2001. The New York Times art critic Roberta Smith wrote that, in Evans's panorama, "the progression of shifting perspectives comes to a close with an exhilarating yet painful moment of illusion created by the painter". The hand-painted spherical work which offers a 360-degree view of Manhattan was exhibited in 2002 at New-York Historical Society as part of a presentation of artifacts, photographs and paintings about the September 11 attacks.

In the mid 2000s, Evans began creating the Supply Chain Portraits series in which he explores the places from which the materials he uses in his life and work originate. One of the first paintings in this series is Riches of the Delta. Omoyele Sowore, a Nigerian human rights activist, described the painting as the "'Riches and Pains' of humanity in the Niger Delta area of Nigeria. Sowore writes:

The large canvas includes within it 150 smaller paintings, drawings and text panels arranged in concentric elliptical tracks that follow the flow of petroleum from an offshore drilling platform in Nigeria to a gas station in the U.S. The painting reveals US connections to world events far off over the horizon, and shows that every US citizen is a participant in a flow of technologies, commodities, transactions, and ethical decisions that connect their lives to the lives of others around the planet.

Another painting in this series, Cobalt Blue, focuses on the process by which the color reaches the artist from the mines in the Democratic Republic of the Congo.

Evans had three solo exhibitions at the Fischbach Gallery in New York City: Open Space (2007), Verdant Refuge (2010), and Equilibrium (2014). He has also presented his work in several other solo, group and public exhibitions, including at the New-York Historical Society, Duke University Museum of Art, Neuberger Museum of Art and Los Angeles Theatre Center. According to the painter and art critic John A. Parks, "Evans paints light-filled landscapes that drop away into glorious, hazy distances." He often starts his painting by first creating on-site color studies of the subject to establish the composition and details. In his studio, he creates a small drawing of the composition which he projects onto a large pre-primed linen canvas on which he applies paint wet-on-wet with no underpainting.

== Personal life ==
Evans attended Christian Science Sunday School as a child and began reading the Christian Science Bible Lesson daily as a youth. In a 2002 interview in The Herald of Christian Science, he said that when he was struggling find his way as an artist, "Christian Science helped [him] put aside fear about [his] future, and a feeling of limitation".

Evans is married and has a son. He lives in Sonoma County, California.

== Art exhibitions ==
- 2019 — "River, Ocean, Sky," Luther Burbank Center for the Arts, Santa Rosa, California
- 2017 — "The Place of Understanding," Pepperwood Preserve, Santa Rosa, California
- 2014 — "Supply Chain Portraits," Taylor & Company, San Francisco, California
- 2013 — "Equilibrium," Fischbach Gallery, New York City
- 2012 — "Family Trees," David Brower Center, Berkeley, California
- 2010 — "Verdant Refuge," Fischbach Gallery, New York City
- 2007 — "Open Space," Fischbach Gallery, New York City
- 2004 — "New York: In the Light of Memory", New-York Historical Society, New York City

== Awards and nominations ==
Year	Award	Category	Work	Result	Refs
1985	Primetime Emmy Awards	Outstanding Special Visual Effects	The Ewok Adventure	Won	
1988	Academy Awards	Best Visual Effects	Willow	Nominated	
