= Robert Schmieder =

American scientist and explorer (born 1941)

Robert William Schmieder
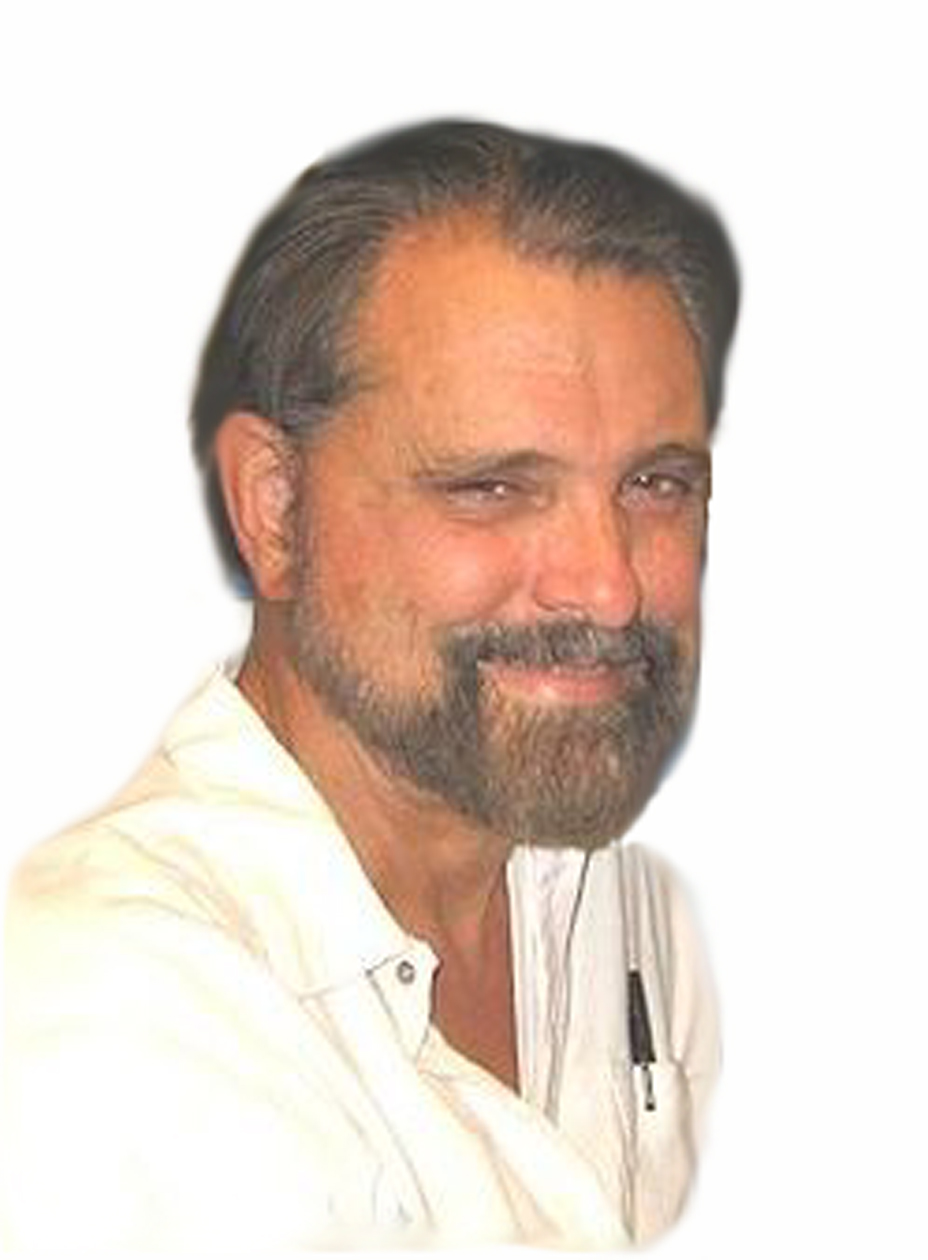
- Born: July 10, 1941 (age 85); Phoenix, Arizona, United States
- Education: Occidental College, Caltech, Columbia
- Known for: NanoLogic, Underwater Islands
- Spouse: Kathleen (Deal) Schmieder
- Awards: Schmieder Bank, 4 named species, NAUI Environmental Award, Amateur Radio Hall of Fame
- Scientific career
- Fields: Physical and Natural Science
- Workplaces: Sandia National Labs, Cordell Expeditions
- Thesis: (1968)

Robert William Schmieder (born July 10, 1941) is an American scientist and explorer. Schmieder has had a multidisciplinary career, broadly divided between physics and related physical sciences, and natural science and exploration. In most of his projects, he created and led teams of both professional scientists and volunteers. His work is documented in about 100 technical publications and 10 books. Among his most significant work was the invention of laser spark spectroscopy (now commercialized), the formulation of nanologic (the use of nanoscale devices in computers), and the concept of underwater islands (which led to designation of the Cordell Bank National Marine Sanctuary).

== Early life and education ==
Schmieder was born and grew up in Phoenix, Arizona, a member of a large family who were descendants of pioneers. His maternal grandmother migrated on horseback from Texas to the mining town of Superior, in the Arizona Territory. His father emigrated from Germany as a watchmaker and was later a businessman. As a child, Robert demonstrated an exceptional curiosity and interest in science, and decided on his career before the age of 12. In high school, he won several science awards, including the Westinghouse Science Talent Search and the Arizona State Science Fair. He was among the first in the United States to develop amateur rocketry, stimulated by events that led to the first Earth satellites in 1957.

=== Formal education ===
B.A. Physics, Occidental College, 1963
B.S. Physics, California Institute of Technology, 1963
M.A. Physics, Columbia University, 1965
Ph.D. Physics, Columbia University, 1968

== Physical science ==
=== Atomic and nuclear physics ===
Schmieder's research career in physical science began while an undergraduate at Caltech, when he wrote his first technical papers. While still an undergraduate, he worked at the CIT synchrotron laboratory, and he participated in the discovery of a new isotope (In^{106}) using the Berkeley 60-inch cyclotron. For his PhD thesis at Columbia University, under the direction of Allen Lurio and William Happer, he made a definitive series of measurements of the hyperfine structure constants and lifetimes of the free alkali atoms. As a post-doc at the Lawrence Berkeley National Laboratory, under the guidance of Richard Marrus, he was the first to produce highly stripped atoms in a high-energy accelerator (the Berkeley HILAC) and to observe relativistic and multipole atomic transitions in those ions. This work led to the new field of "high-energy atomic physics." He also made significant contributions to instrumentation for X-ray spectroscopy, including the Doppler-tuned XRay spectrometer, the electron ring accelerator as a spectroscopic source, laser modulation of electron beams, superconducting switches, and laser/microwave gas breakdown.

=== Spectroscopy and chemical physics ===
In the early 1970s, he accepted a position at Sandia National Laboratories, Livermore. His first work at Sandia was the 1976 invention of laser spark spectroscopy, a technique that is now commercialized [see Supplemental references]. During the early 1980s, he was the first to record the UV fluorescence spectrum of acetylene, the emission spectrum of pure tritium gas, the use of tritium for radiolytic polymerization of hydrocarbons, and the use of carbon-14 to track reaction pathways in carbon formation in flames.

=== Plasma physics and collective dynamics ===
During the Strategic Defense Initiative period (mid-1980s), he led the effort to calculate the effects of clustering of X-ray lasers. Following the SDI, he led a team that built two state-of-the-art electron beam ion sources (EBIS), obtaining highly charged ions up to Xe^{+46} in laboratory experiments and a design capability of U^{+90}. During the early 1990s, he was Principal Investigator of a team that developed an advanced model and simulation code for the plasma color video display, part of a national initiative that produced the current flat-panel display. He also developed a new model of collective dynamics of minimally cognitive populations, and applied it to various dynamical systems, including biological populations and artificial life.

=== NanoLogic ===
During the mid-1990s, Schmieder's interest turned to nanotechnology. In a collaboration with Robert Bastasz, he was the first to observe Coulomb explosion on a solid surface, from which they developed a new process using high charge state ions for fabricating nanoelectronic devices, and recognized the potential of such systems to high-density computing and information technology. Schmieder's key insight following that work was that nanoscale devices are intrinsically hybrid analog/digital, and therefore the optimum architecture and data structures for data processing arrays also should be hybrid A/D. He named this new technology "nanologic." In 1997, he left Sandia to found a startup company NanoLogic, Inc., but after an initial round of funding, the market collapse of 2000 made it impossible to obtain further funding and the company became inactive.

=== Current research ===
Schmieder continues research into nanologic as a new paradigm for machine-assisted problem solving. In particular, he develops the rigorous mathematical basis of applications of nanologic, and performs experiments with systems to demonstrate the principles of the technology. He emphasizes that a nanologic machine is not a computer in the sense of performing computations, but a machine for abstracting the meaning from incomplete or imperfect information and making "intelligent" conclusions or predictions. In this sense, nanologic is closer to human cognition and analysis than to computation.

During his years at Berkeley, Schmieder worked with Albert Ghiorso, the discoverer of 12 transuranic chemical elements who died in 2010. He has written a scientific biography: Element: The Amazing Life and Work of Albert Ghiorso.

== Natural science ==
=== Overview ===
Dr. Schmieder's work in natural science and exploration began in the mid-1970s, when he began to organize and lead a series of scientific expeditions to extremely remote oceanic locations. To formalize the work, he established a nonprofit organization, Cordell Expeditions. Throughout these projects, he coordinated the work of a large number of specialists and volunteers, ensuring the scientific viability of extensive collections of specimens and observational data. The work led to many discoveries in geography, geology and marine biology, including numerous new species named to honor the expeditions and personnel (Armina cordellensis, Codium schmiederi, Erylus schmiederi, Halcelia bozanici, Homalopoma cordellensis, Megalomphalus schmiederi, Ophioderma vansyoci, Paratimea alijosensis, Pharia pyramidata schmiederi, Thor cordelli). Cumulatively, Cordell Expeditions is responsible for the field work leading more than 1000 new species, new genera, first recorded observations, and range/depth extensions.

=== Cordell Bank ===
Schmieder's first, and most extensive, field project was the exploration of Cordell Bank, a rocky bank west of Pt. Reyes, California. Over nearly 10 years (1977–86), he and his group explored and described the bank. As a result of this work, the Cordell Bank National Marine Sanctuary was designated in 1989 by an Act of Congress, signed by Pres. George H. W. Bush. draft environmental impact statement and management plan for the proposed Cordell Bank National Marine Sanctuary, Marine and Estuarine Management Division, Office of Coastal Resource Management, National Ocean Service, NOAA, May, 1987. In the course of this project, Schmieder published papers on the geological structure of the bank, morphology and speciation of a resident gastropod, local history, and the impact of human activities on the biological community. culminating with the definitive case study Ecology of an Underwater Island. A second monograph, Edward Cordell and the Discovery of Cordell Bank, was published in 2019. The Oakland (CA) Museum has a permanent exhibit on Cordell Bank, displaying and honoring the work of Cordell Expeditions.

=== Schmieder Bank ===
During 1986–87, Schmieder's team carried out a series of explorations of an unnamed bank off Pt. Sur, south of Monterey, California, resulting in the discovery of previously unknown topographic features and the largest known colonies of the California hydrocoral. This work resulted in the inclusion of sensitive areas within the proposed Monterey Bay National Marine Sanctuary. Following a recommendation by Dr. Sylvia Earle (National Oceanic and Atmospheric Administration), Dr. Paul Silva (UC Berkeley), and Dr. Melanie Stright (U.S. Minerals Management Service), it was named Schmieder Bank by the U. S. Board of Geographic Names.

=== Other expeditions ===
North Farallon Island: In the late 1980s, his team explored the North Farallon Islands, resulting in the discovery of many new biological records and a previously unknown (natural) submarine tunnel.

Rocas Alijos: In 1990 and again in 1993, Schmieder and a team of thirty carried out the first comprehensive scientific expeditions to Rocas Alijos, Baja California. The monograph Rocas Alijos, published in 1994 by Kluwer Academic Publishers, resulted from these expeditions.

Guadalupe Island: This was a radio expedition done in 1993 in conjunction with the Rocas Alijos project.

Roqueta Island: A radio expedition done in 1994.

Peter I Island: In 1994 he participated in an expedition to Peter I Island, Antarctica, documented in his book 3YØPI.

Easter Island: In 1995 he carried out a complex and ambitious expedition to Easter Island, during which the team examined the unexplored marine areas. This expedition was the first on record to have a real-time interactive website and e-mail direct to the remote site. It is documented in his book DX-Aku: Messages from the Easter Island Expedition.

Heard Island: In 1997 he organized and led the extraordinary expedition to Heard Island, Antarctica, during which his team logged a world-record number of radio contacts (more than 80,000). His book, VKØIR: The Heard Island Expedition, describes the expedition.

San Felix Island: In 2002 he was an organizing member of the expedition to San Felix Island, Chile, the first non-military group to visit the island. This expedition is documented in his book XRØX The 2002 Expedition to San Felix.

Kure Atoll: In 2005 he was the Principal Organizer and Expedition Leader of the expedition to Kure Atoll, NW Hawaiian Islands. For this project, he developed an internet application (DXA), the first website for displaying data from the remote site in real time on a web browser. The website received more than 40 million hits during the expedition.

Clipperton Island: Schmieder organized and led the March, 2013, expedition to Clipperton Island. The team of 29 made the first discovery of foraminifera on Clipperton and set a record for the number of radio contacts from there (113,601). This expedition and the 2005 expedition to Kure (above) are described in his book DXA. The Real-time Online Radio Log Server.

Heard Island: In 2016, Schmieder carried out a second major research expedition to Heard Island. The team made extensive observations of the volcano Big Ben, environmental changes due to climate change, and real-time communications using amateur radio. In 2023 he completed his book Heard Island: Two Centuries of Change, and More Coming. It is published by Springer, 900+ pages, 2023.

Pitcairn Island: In 2018 Schmieder and a colleague carried out an expedition to Pitcairn Island, for the purpose of studying foraminifera, microscopic single-celled organisms of importance in dating fossil sediments.

St. Paul Island: In 2019 Schmieder and a colleague carried out an expedition to St. Paul Island (Pribilofs), for the purpose of studying foraminifera.

Azores Islands: In 2022 Schmieder, his younger son, and two colleagues carried out two expeditions to the Azores, for the purpose of studying the recolonization of ocean floor that had been destroyed by lava flow from the 1956 eruption of the volcano at Caplinhos on Faial Island.

=== The Cordell Explorer ===
In 1986, Schmieder acquired and outfitted a research vessel, the Cordell Explorer, and used it in some of the research expeditions. In recent years, he has used the vessel principally for educational programs, taking more than 300 students each year on 1-day cruises to learn about the marine environment and techniques for monitoring and research.

== Books by Robert William Schmieder ==
- Ecology of an Underwater Island (Cordell Expeditions, 1991)
- 3YØPI Peter I Island 1994 DXpedition (Cordell Expeditions, 1994)
- DX-Aku: Messages from the 1995 Easter Island Expedition (Cordell Expeditions, 1995)
- Rocas Alijos: Scientific Results from the Cordell Expeditions (Kluwer Academic Publishers, 1996)
- VKØIR Heard Island (Cordell Expeditions, 1997, printed by FunkAmateur)
- XRØX: The 2002 Expedition to San Felix (Cordell Expeditions, 2003)
- Great Adventures (Children's stories, private, 2010)
- DXA: The Real-time Online Radio Log Server (Cordell Expeditions, 2013)
- Harry: The Life of Harry Taylor Sherman Cordell Expeditions (2018)
- Edward Cordell and the Discovery of Cordell Bank (Springer, 2019)
- Heard Island: Two Centuries of Change, and More Coming (Springer, 2023)

== Personal ==
Dr. Schmieder was born July 10, 1941, in Phoenix, Arizona. His father (Otto Schmieder) emigrated from Germany in the 1920s, and became a very successful businessman. His mother (Ruby Harkey) was part of a pioneer family in the territory of Arizona.

His brother (Carl Schmieder) was a distinguished businessman and aviator before losing his life at age 60 in a private aircraft accident. He has three grown children (Robyn (Schmieder) Thelin, Russell Schmieder, and Randy Schmieder), and six grandchildren. He is married to Kathleen (Deal) Schmieder, a school teacher for 28 years and currently a businesswoman.

Schmieder has served in numerous professional service roles, including program committee, International Combustion Symposium, 1982, 1984, 1988; editor, Proc. Workshop Electron Beam Ion Sources, Cornell U., 1985; National Academy of Sciences Committee on Ion Storage Rings, 1986; editor, Defense Research Review, 1986–1992; NATO Summer Institute, Highly Ionized Atoms, Cargese, France, 1988; International Ion Source Conf. program committee, Berkeley, 1989. He was a beta tester for Maxis Software 1995. He was active in the Sierra Club, working on the Prop. 20 (Coastline Initiative). In 1986, he was elected a Fellow of the Explorers Club and served for several years as chairman of its Northern California Chapter.

He has traveled to all 7 continents and about 30 countries worldwide, including three Atlantic Ocean crossings by boat. His principal hobby is amateur radio; he holds Amateur Extra Class license KK6EK, and has been honored by Expedition of the Year (four times), Life Membership in the Central Arizona DX Association, and the American Radio Relay League Colvin Award (three times). In 2011, he was inducted into the Amateur Radio Hall of Fame.

== Supplemental references ==
- Radziemski, Leon J.; Cremers, David A. (2006). Handbook of laser-induced breakdown spectroscopy. New York: John Wiley. ISBN 0-470-09299-8.
- Schechter, Israel; Miziolek, Andrzej W.; Vincenzo Palleschi (2006). Laser-induced breakdown spectroscopy. (LIBS): Fundamentals and Applications. Cambridge, UK: Cambridge University Press. ISBN 0-521-85274-9.
- Andrzej W. Miziolek, Vincenzo Palleschi, Israel Schechter (2006). Laser Induced Breakdown Spectroscopy. New York: Cambridge University Press. ISBN 0-521-85274-9.
- Noll, Reinhard (2012). Laser-Induced Breakdown Spectroscopy: Fundamentals and Applications. Berlin: Springer. ISBN 3-642-20667-0.
