= Gulf of the Farallones =

Gulf between the Farallon Islands and the mainland coast of California, United States

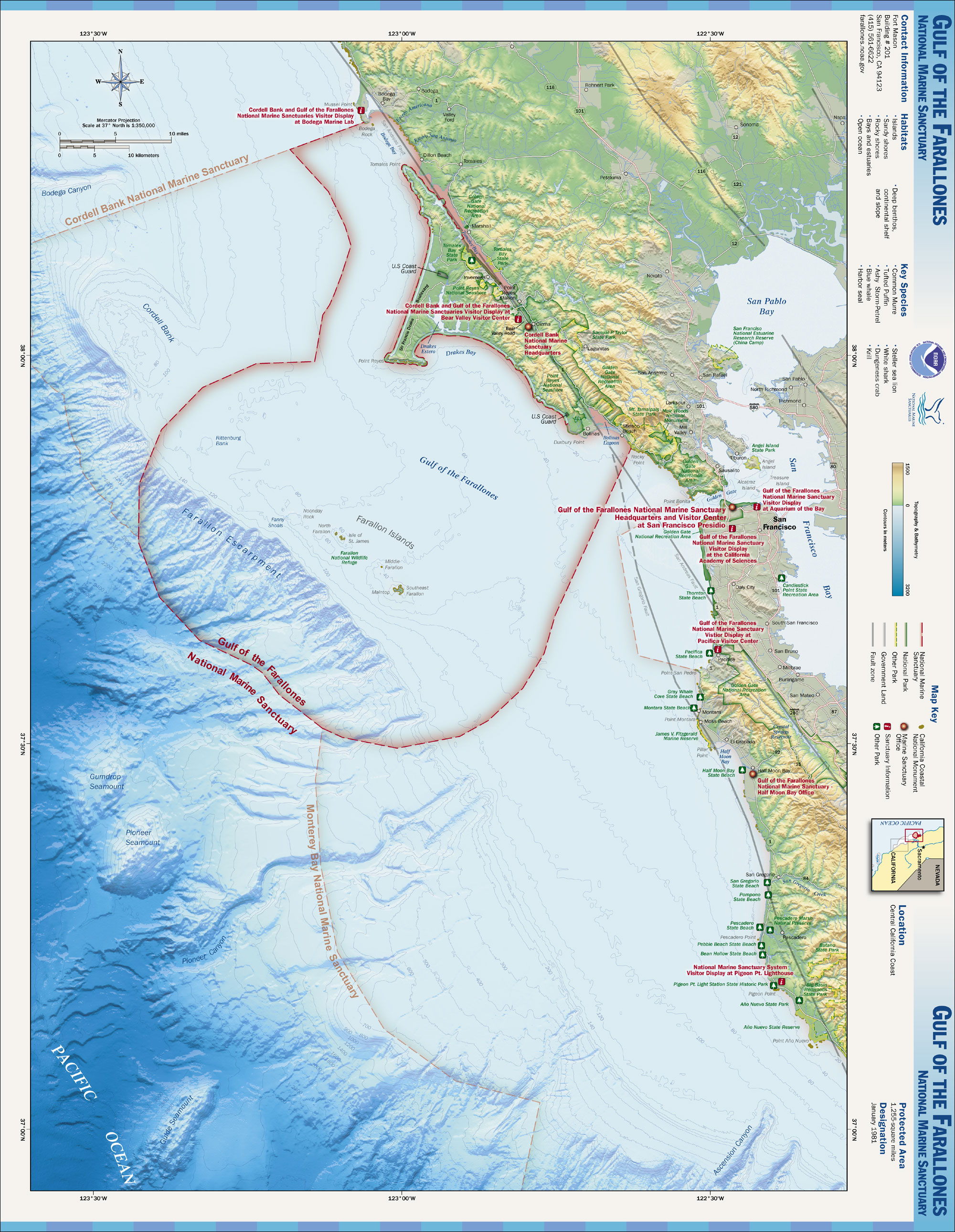
Map of the Gulf of the Farallones National Marine Sanctuary, showing the location of the Gulf itself within

Gulf of the Farallones is a gulf of the Pacific Ocean off the northern California coast. It extends westward from the opening of the San Francisco Bay and Drakes Bay to the Farallon Islands. Most of the gulf lies in Gulf of the Farallones National Marine Sanctuary, which protects about 1,250 square miles (3,200 km^{2}). It is South and West of Cordell Bank National Marine Sanctuary. It is North and East of Monterey Bay National Marine Sanctuary.

"The Gulf of the Farallones refers to the continental shelf area (< 200 m depth) off central California between Point Reyes (38°N) to the north and Point Montara (37.5°N) to the south and extends 80 km offshore (Steger et al., 1998)"

The gulf, via the Golden Gate strait, is home to major shipping lines to the Port of San Francisco, Port of Oakland, and Port of Richmond. The gulf has also historically been used as a dumping ground for various types of waste, including dredging sediment, industrial waste, sunk vessels, and barrels of low-level nuclear waste. Around 47,800 barrels of nuclear waste were dumped between 1946 and 1970; their location was largely unknown until mapping and monitoring efforts in the 1990s.

Farallones comes from the Spanish farallón meaning sea cliff and is a reference to the islands. Historical names for the gulf include Bahia De Puerto De San Francisco, Ensenada De Los Farallones, and La Bahia De Los Pinos.

== See also ==
- Southern California Bight
- California Current
- Cordell Bank National Marine Sanctuary
- Greater Farallones National Marine Sanctuary
- Monterey Bay National Marine Sanctuary
- Chumash Heritage National Marine Sanctuary
- Channel Islands National Marine Sanctuary

== Sources ==
- Beyond the Golden Gate: Oceanography, Oceanography, Geology, Biology, and Environmental Issues in the Gulf of the Farallones. (2000). Edited by Herman A. Karl, John L. Chin, Edward Ueber, Peter H. Stauffer, and James W. Hendley II. U.S. Geological Survey, Circular 1198.
