= Harrison Ellenshaw =

American painter

- Born: Peter Samuel Ellenshaw; July 20, 1945 (age 81); Harrisburg, Pennsylvania
- Occupation: Visual effects
- Years active: 1974–present
- Father: Peter Ellenshaw

Harrison Ellenshaw (born Peter Samuel Ellenshaw, July 20, 1945, in Harrisburg, Pennsylvania) is an American matte painter, following his British father Peter Ellenshaw. He started his career at Walt Disney Studios. He later joined George Lucas's effects studio Industrial Light and Magic (ILM), where he produced many of the matte visual effects backgrounds for the films Star Wars (1977) and The Empire Strikes Back (1980). He then returned to Disney and worked on the 1979 film The Black Hole, for which he and his father were nominated for an Academy Award for their work. He also worked on The Watcher in the Woods (1980), and Tron (1982), for which he was Visual Effects Supervisor, and Dick Tracy (1990). He eventually headed Disney Studio's effects department, Buena Vista Visual Effects (BVVE).

Harrison Ellenshaw is now pursuing his passion for fine art painting. His son Michael Ellenshaw has directed a short film while his sister Lynda Thompson is also a visual effects artist.

== Selected filmography ==
- The Man Who Fell To Earth (1976), special photographic effects - credited as P.S. Ellenshaw
- Star Wars (1977), matte artist
- The Black Hole (1979), matte artist and effects (Academy Award nominee for visual effects)
- The Empire Strikes Back (1980), matte artist
- Tron (1982), visual effects supervisor and associate producer
- Superman IV: The Quest for Peace (1987), visual effects supervisor and second unit director
- Dick Tracy (1990), matte artist
- Prop Culture (2020), himself, Episode: "Tron"
