= Greater Farallones National Marine Sanctuary =

Marine protected area in California, USA

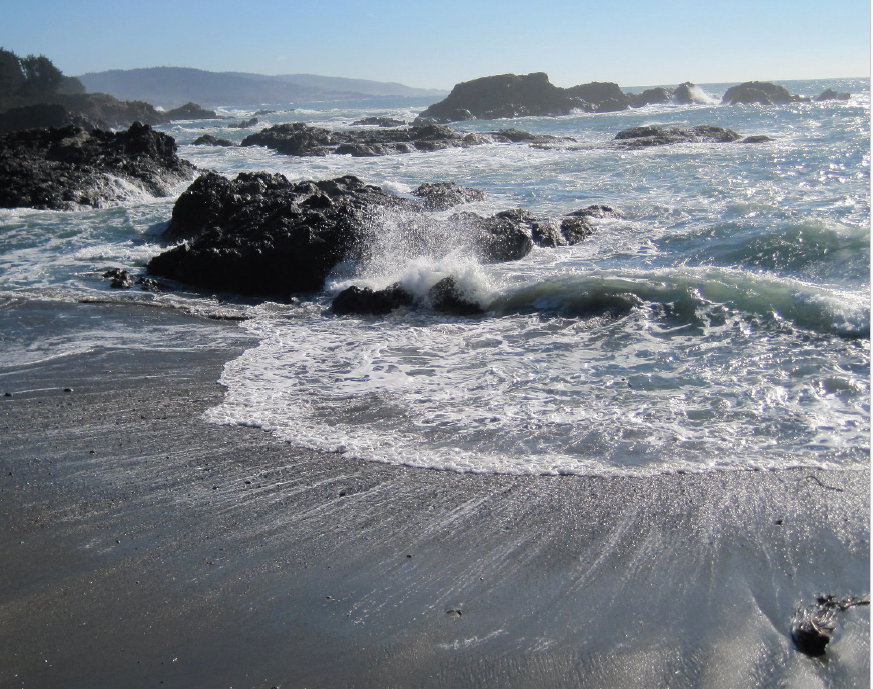
- The shoreline of the Greater Farallones National Marine Sanctuary

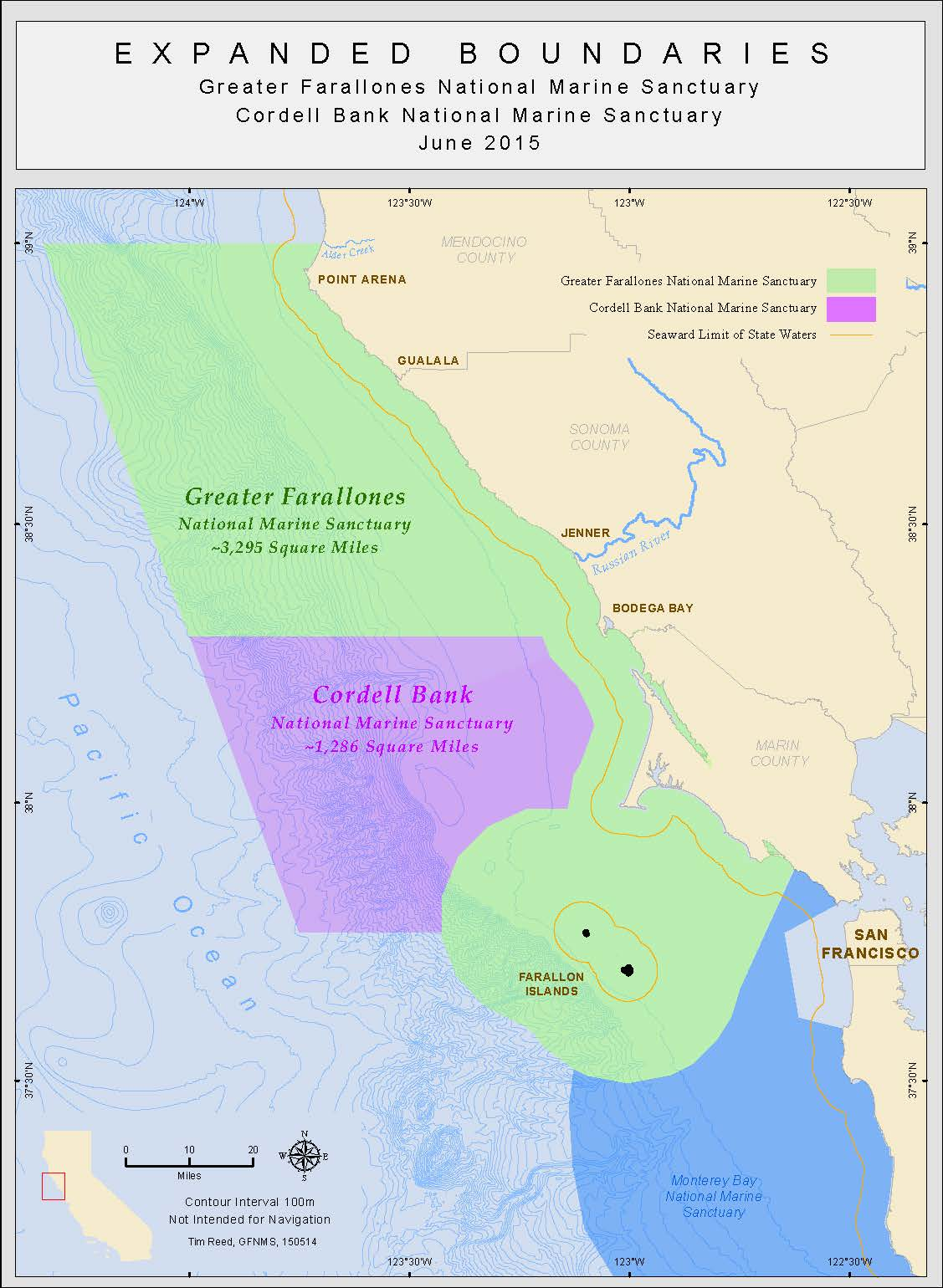
- Map of the Greater Farallones sanctuary
- Interactive map of Greater Farallones National Marine Sanctuary
- Location: Gulf of the Farallones, California, United States
- Coordinates: 37.8°N 123°W
- Area: 3,295 sq mi (8,530 km^{2})
- Established: January 16, 1981; 45 years ago
- Governing body: NOAA National Ocean Service
- Website: farallones.noaa.gov

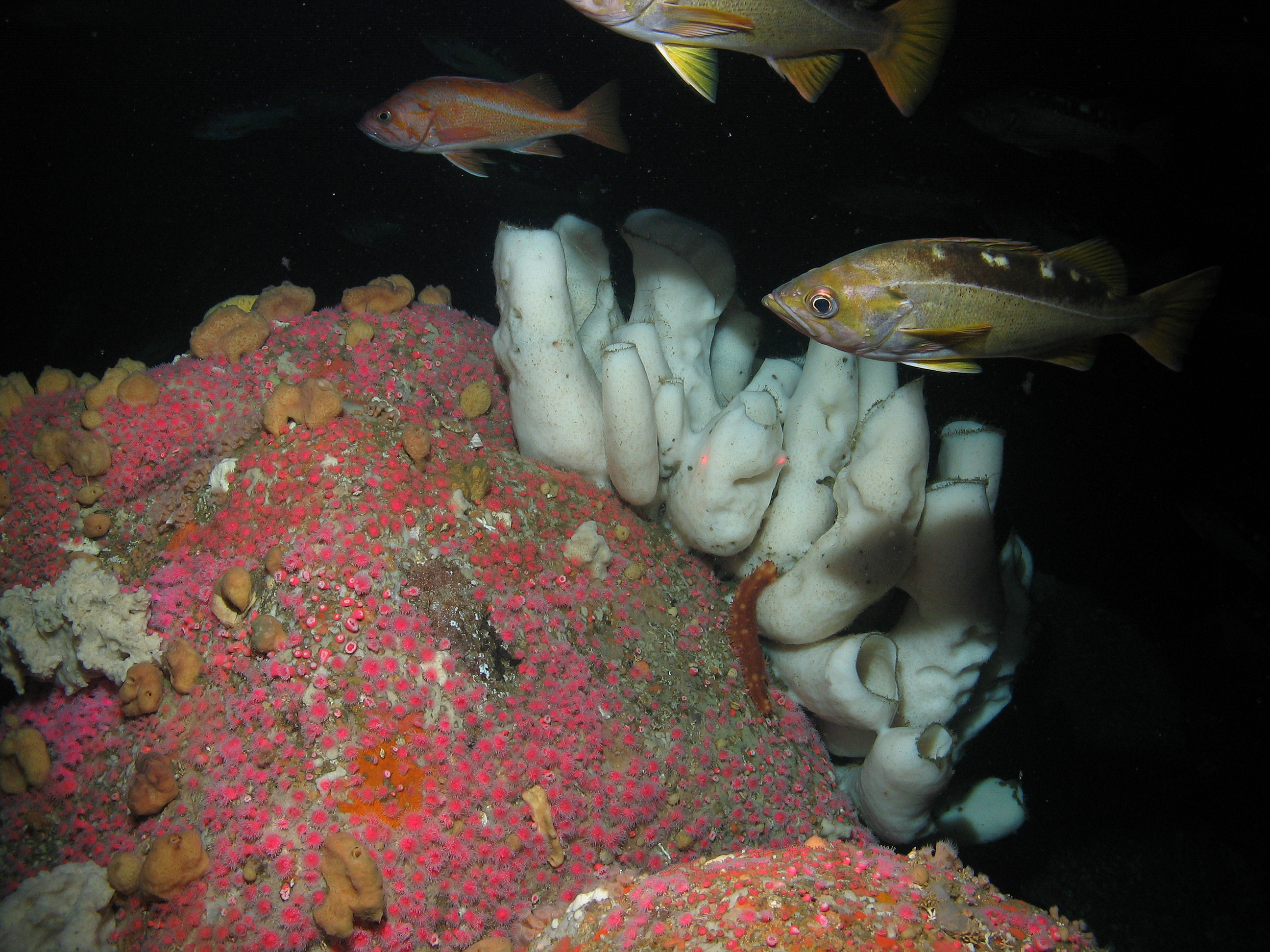
Yellowtail rockfish over boot sponges in the Greater Farallones National Marine Sacntuary.

The Greater Farallones National Marine Sanctuary (formerly Gulf of the Farallones National Marine Sanctuary) protects the wildlife, habitats, and cultural resources of one of the most diverse and bountiful marine environments in the world, an area of 3,295 square miles off the northern and central California coast. The waters within Greater Farallones National Marine Sanctuary are part of a nationally significant marine ecosystem, and support an abundance of life, including many threatened or endangered species.

== About ==
In 1972, in response to a growing awareness of the value of the coastal waters of the United States, the United States Congress passed the National Marine Sanctuaries Act. The Act authorized the designation of National Marine Sanctuaries to protect significant waters and secure habitat for aquatic species, shelter historically significant shipwrecks and other cultural resources, and serve as valuable spots for research, fishing, wildlife viewing, boating, and tourism.

Designated on January 16, 1981, Gulf of the Farallones National Marine Sanctuary (GFNMS) spanned 1,279 square miles (966 square nautical miles) just north and west of San Francisco Bay, and protected open ocean, nearshore tidal flats, rocky intertidal areas, estuarine wetlands, subtidal reefs, and coastal beaches within its boundaries. In 2015, GFNMS expanded north and west of their original boundaries to encompass 3,295 square miles, and changed their name to Greater Farallones National Marine Sanctuary. GFNMS has administrative jurisdiction over the northern portion of the Monterey Bay National Marine Sanctuary, from the San Mateo/Santa Cruz County line northward to the existing boundary between the two sanctuaries. GFNMS maintains an administrative office and public Visitor Center on Crissy Field in the Presidio of San Francisco.

GFNMS is located within the California Current ecosystem, one of four major eastern boundary currents in the world, that stretches along the western coast of North America from southern Canada to northern Mexico. Due to a high degree of wind-driven upwelling, there is a ready supply of nutrients to surface waters and the California Current ecosystem is one of the most biologically productive regions in the world.

GFNMS is a globally significant, extraordinarily diverse, and productive marine ecosystem that supports abundant wildlife and valuable fisheries. It provides breeding and feeding grounds for at least twenty-five endangered or threatened species; thirty-six marine mammal species, including blue, gray, and humpback whales, harbor seals, elephant seals, Pacific white-sided dolphins, and one of the southernmost U.S. populations of threatened Steller sea lions; over a quarter-million breeding seabirds; and one of the most significant white shark populations on the planet.

GFNMS adjoins two other National Marine Sanctuaries, Monterey Bay National Marine Sanctuary and Cordell Bank National Marine Sanctuary. It comprises part of the United Nations' Golden Gate Biosphere Reserve. Within the sanctuary are the Farallon Islands and associated National Wildlife Refuge.

== See also ==
- List of marine protected areas of California
