= Iroise National Nature Reserve =

French Biosphere reserve

Coordinates: 48°22′N 4°56′W

The Iroise National Nature Reserve (Note: English: /ɪˈrwɑːz/) (French: Parc naturel marin d’Iroise) is a French Biosphere reserve located in the northern Iroise Sea, consisting of three inhabited islands (Ushant, Sein and Molène), as well as the Molène archipelago (which consists of around twenty smaller islands), and the waters between the islands. All the major ecosystems of the Atlantic biogeographical region (island, coastal and marine) are represented: the marine environment, beaches, cliffs with Atlantic coastal vegetation, heathlands and grasslands.

== History ==
The park is the first protected marine area in France and it received IUCN Green List status in 2014.

== Ecological characteristics ==
Iles et Mer d'Iroise Biosphere Reserve, located on the coast of Brittany, comprises a marine park and the island of Sein, small rocky marine islands and islets and open marine areas to a depth of -20 meters with strong currents and a high tidal range.

It is of significance from a biodiversity point of view since it encompasses a variety of habitats e.g. for more than 300 species of seaweed, large sea bird colonies and populations of basking shark (Cetorhinus maximus) and grey seal (Halichoerus grypus).

Ushant reaches no higher than 60 meters in altitude and its landscape is one of meadows grazed by sheep and crisscrossed with stone walls and numerous hamlets.

== Socio-economic characteristics ==
Daily tourism is a significant element of the local economy, providing the basis for commercial activities on the islands. However, also fishing activities remain important.

Numerous educational and training activities are carried out in the biosphere reserve, such as guided visits for school classes, exhibits, public information meetings and internships.
