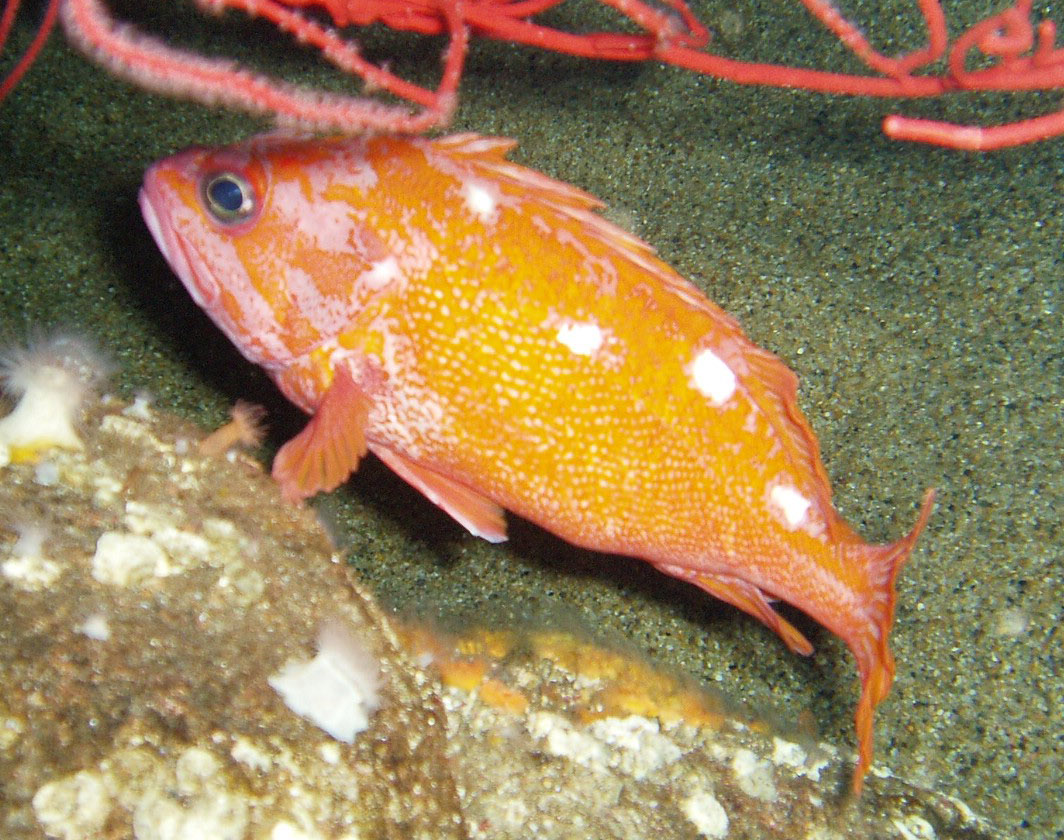

Scientific classification
- Kingdom: Animalia
- Phylum: Chordata
- Class: Actinopterygii
- Order: Perciformes
- Family: Scorpaenidae
- Genus: Sebastes
- Species: S. rosaceus

Binomial name
- Sebastes rosaceus Girard, 1854

Synonyms
- Sebastodes rosaceus (Girard, 1854)

= Sebastes rosaceus =

Species of fish

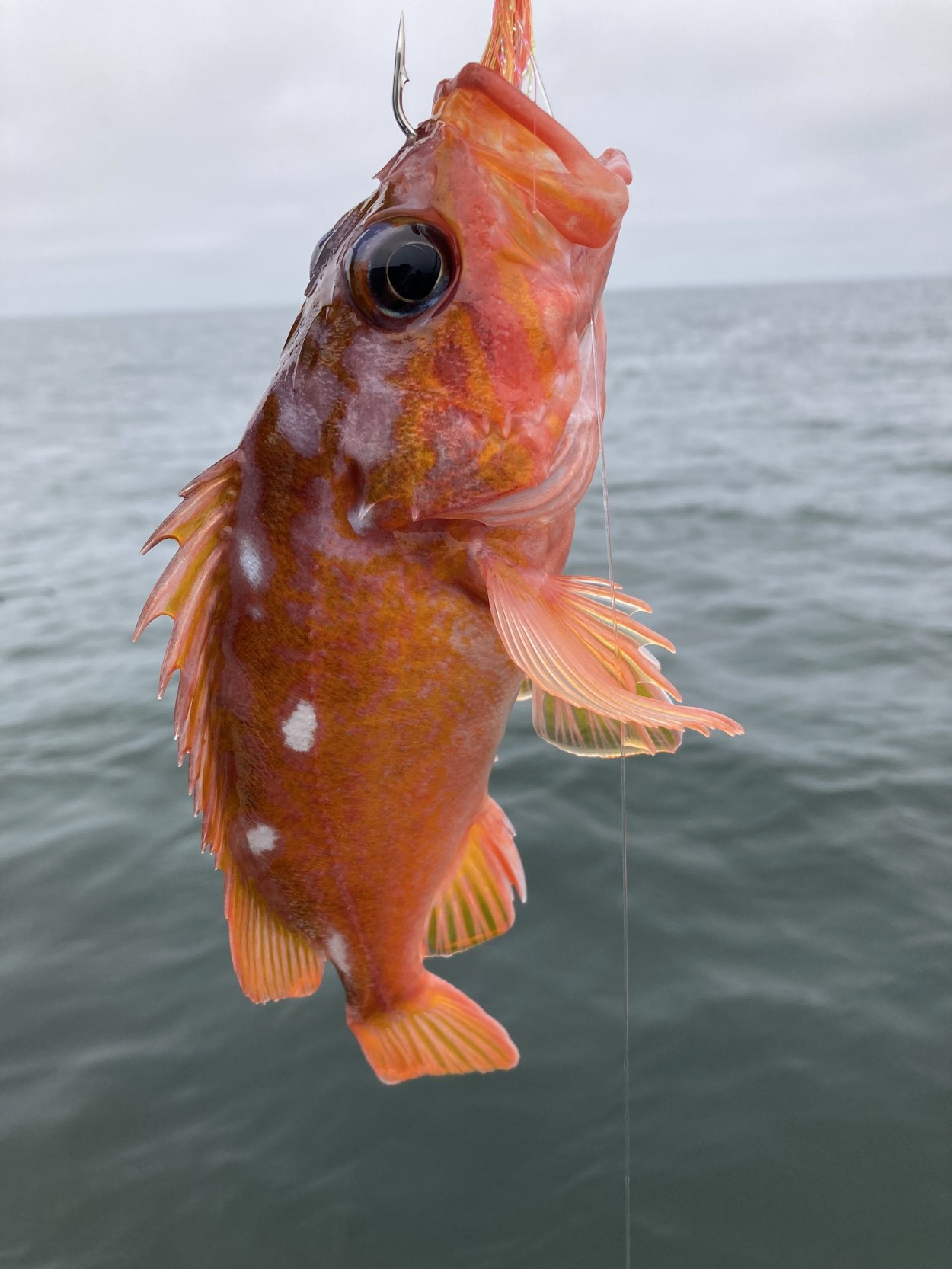
A small rosy rockfish caught on a shrimp fly near Half Moon Bay, California

Sebastes rosaceus, the rosy rockfish, is a species of marine ray-finned fish belonging to the subfamily Sebastinae, the rockfishes, part of the family Scorpaenidae. It is found in the Eastern Pacific.

== Taxonomy ==
Sebestes rosaceus was first formally described in 1854 by the French zoologist Charles Frédéric Girard with the type locality given as San Diego, California. Some authorities place this species in the subgenus Sebastomus, of which it is the type species. The specific name rosaceus means "pink" a reference to the uniform reddish color of this species.

== Description ==
Sebastes rosaceus is a relatively small species of rockfish which has a body depth that is slightly more than a third of its standard length. They have a short, spine covered head with a short snout and a small terminal mouth and large eyes which bulge above the dorsal profile of the head. They have 13 or 14 spines and 11 to 14 rays in their dorsal fin and their anal fin has 3 spines and 5 to 7 soft rays. They have a truncate caudal fin. They attain a maximum total length of 36 cm (14 in). The color varies from yellow to red to light pink with purple stripes on the head and upper body. There are 4 to 6 nearly square-shaped white blotches just underneath the dorsal fin. The membranes of the fins are pink and yellow. After being caught the typically quickly change color to a uniform deep red.

== Distribution and habitat ==
Rosy rockfish may be found as far north as Puget Sound in Washington, but its main distribution is from central California to Guerrero Negro in Baja California Sur. This is a demersal fish which can be found at depths between 15 and 128 m (49 and 420 ft), although more usual between 30 and 46 m (98 and 151 ft). They prefer hard substrates such as reefs or man-made structures like pilings.

== Biology ==
Sebastes rosaceus has venomous spines in its fins. The bright colors this species shows are not visible at the depths it is normally found at where it is actually camouflaged against its rock backdrop. They have a maximum longevity of 14 years. They feed on benthic animals including fishes, crustaceans and cephalopods. This species, like its congeners, is ovoviviparous and larger females may have up to 5 broods of larvae in a year if conditions allow. It can be either solitary or live in small schools.

== Fisheries ==
Sebastes rosaceus is too small to be of interest to commercial fisheries and most are caught by recreational anglers. It is said to have very palatable flesh, although any fillets will be rather small.
