= Peter Ellenshaw =

English painter

- Born: William Samuel Cook Ellenshaw; 24 May 1913; London, England
- Died: 12 February 2007 (aged 93); Santa Barbara, California
- Occupations: matte designer and special effects creator
- Known for: Disney features
- Relatives: Harrison Ellenshaw (son)
- Awards: Academy Award Best Visual Effects, Disney Legends Awards

William Samuel Cook "Peter" Ellenshaw (24 May 1913 – 12 February 2007) was an English matte designer and special effects creator who worked on many Disney features. Born in London, he moved to America in 1953.

== Career & life ==
He first worked in matte painting for producer Alexander Korda on such films as Things to Come (1936), and later on such Powell and Pressburger productions as Black Narcissus (1947) assisting his mentor W. (Walter) Percy Day. A few years later, while still based in Europe, he began to work for Hollywood studios. He worked for MGM on Quo Vadis (1951), but his most extensive association was with Walt Disney Studios beginning with their first completely live action feature film, Treasure Island (1950). He went on to work on 20,000 Leagues Under the Sea (1954) and Mary Poppins (1964), for which he won an Academy Award. He retired after his work on The Black Hole (1979), but contributed matte paintings for Dick Tracy (1990). both of which he collaborated with his son Harrison Ellenshaw, also a renowned matte artist and effects designer.

After Peter Ellenshaw retired from the film business, he dedicated his life to his passion for painting. Numerous works were created, of both Disney and non-Disney themed subjects, which have been highly collected. He was named a Disney Legend in 1993.

== Selected filmography ==
- The Thief of Bagdad (1940), assistant matte artist
- A Matter of Life and Death (1946), assistant matte artist
- Black Narcissus (1947), assistant matte artist
- The Red Shoes (1948), assistant matte artist
- Treasure Island (1950), matte artist
- 20,000 Leagues Under the Sea (1954), matte artist
- Davy Crockett, King of the Wild Frontier (1955), matte artist
- Old Yeller (1957), matte artist
- Johnny Tremain (1957), production designer
- Darby O'Gill and the Little People (1959), special effects
- Pollyanna (1960), matte artist
- Swiss Family Robinson (1960), matte artist
- The Absent-Minded Professor (1961), special effects
- Mary Poppins (1964), special effects (Academy Award winner)
- The Love Bug (1969), special effects
- Bedknobs and Broomsticks (1971), art direction (Academy Award nominee)
- The Island at the Top of the World (1974), special effects and production design (Academy Award nominee for the latter)
- The Black Hole (1979), miniature effects creator (Academy Award nominee for visual effects)
- Dick Tracy (1990), matte artist

== Books ==
- Peter Ellenshaw; Ellenshaw Under Glass - Going to the Matte for Disney
- Mark Cotta Vaz; Craig Barron: The Invisible Art: The Legends of Movie Matte Painting, Chronicle Books, 2002; ISBN 0-8118-3136-1
