= Pepperwood Preserve =

Nature preserve in California

Pepperwood Preserve is a 3,117-acre plot of land owned by the Pepperwood Foundation, located in the Mayacamas Mountains in the coast ranges of California near the towns of Santa Rosa and Healdsburg in Sonoma County. The preserve includes the headwaters of Mark West Creek, Franz Creek, and Brooks Creek all of which feed into the Russian River. The highest point on the preserve is 1,560 feet (480 m).

== Management ==
The California Academy of Sciences sold the preserve in 2005 to Healdsburg residents Herb and Jane Dwight, who sit on the five-member Pepperwood Foundation board of directors and have donated over $20 million for land and facilities at the preserve. Herb Dwight is the former CEO of Optical Coating Laboratory in Santa Rosa. The facilities include a $9 million, 9,400-square-foot, solar-powered center for environmental research and education. The preserve has an agreement with Santa Rosa Junior College and Sonoma State University to use the site for field studies. Lisa Micheli, with a Ph.D. in geomorphology, was hired as executive director in 2009.

Pacific Gas and Electric installed a microgrid at the site to allow it to remove above-ground power lines.

== Climate ==
Pepperwood has a Mediterranean climate that includes cool wet winters (November–April) and hot dry summers (May–October). Streams are intermittent. During the wet winter, standing water can be found in numerous small ponds.

== Geological history ==
Pepperwood's geology is complex with exposures of Glen Ellen sediments, Sonoma volcanics and Franciscan metamorphics. There are several areas with serpentine soils.

== Vegetation ==
Pepperwood includes redwood and Douglas-fir forests on mesic sites and grassland, woodland, and chaparral on xeric sites. Wetlands are composed of riparian forests, springs, marshes, ponds, and vernal pools.
