= Farallon Islands =

Group of islands off the coast of California, United States

Farallon Islands National Wildlife Refuge
- IUCN category Ia (strict nature reserve)
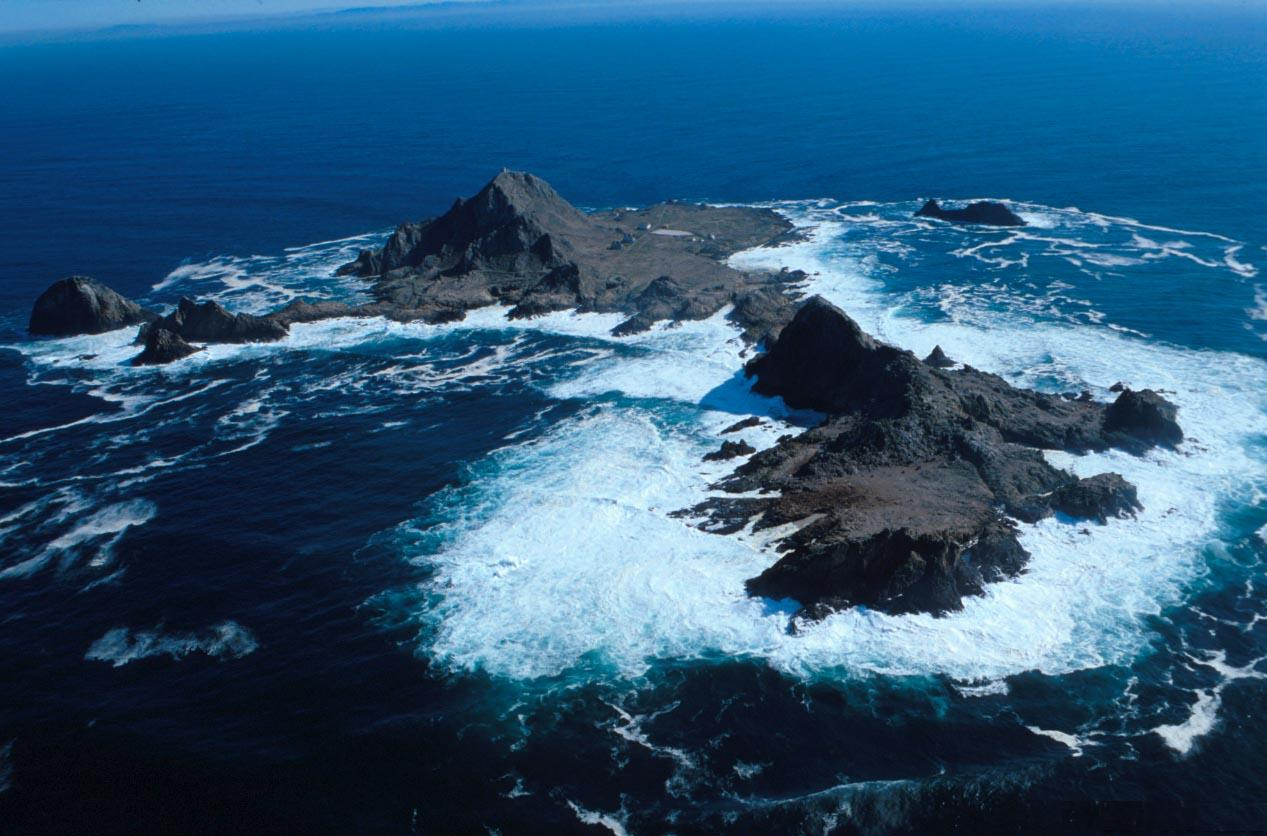
- Southeast Farallon Islands from the west, with Maintop Island in the foreground (right)

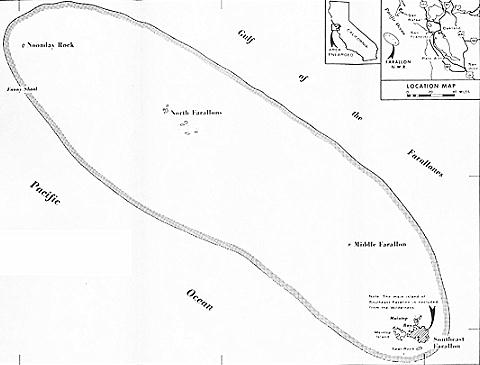
- Location: Pacific Ocean
- Nearest city: San Francisco, California, United States
- Coordinates: 37°43′30″N 123°01′49″W
- Established: 1969
- Governing body: United States Fish and Wildlife Service
- Website: Farallon Islands National Wildlife Refuge
- Farallon Islands
- U.S. National Register of Historic Places
- Area: 211 acres (85.4 ha)
- NRHP reference No.: 77000332
- Added to NRHP: March 8, 1977

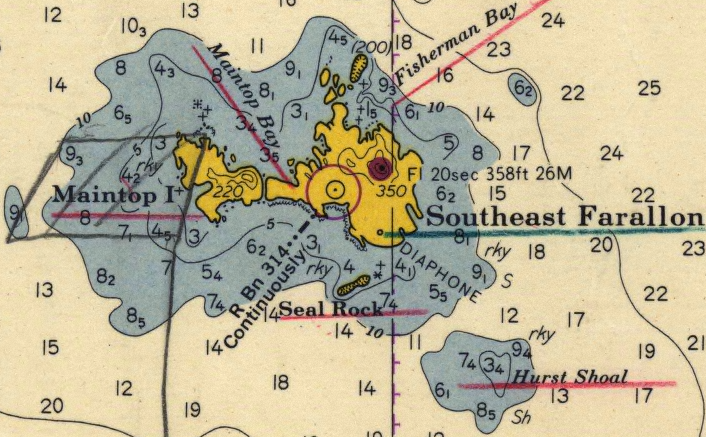
Southeast Farallon Islands (from nautical chart of 1957)

A Fata Morgana mirage of the Farallon Islands, as viewed from San Francisco

The Farallon Islands (/færəlɔːn/ FA-ra-lon), or Farallones (from Spanish farallón 'pillar, sea cliff'), are a group of islands and sea stacks in the Gulf of the Farallones, off the coast of San Francisco, California, United States. The islands are also sometimes referred to by mariners as the Devil's Teeth Islands, in reference to the many treacherous underwater shoals in their vicinity. The islands lie 30 miles (48 km) outside the Golden Gate and 20 miles (32 km) south of Point Reyes, and are visible from the mainland on clear days. The islands are part of the City and County of San Francisco. The only inhabited portion of the islands is on Southeast Farallon Island (SEFI), where researchers from Point Blue Conservation Science and the U.S. Fish and Wildlife Service stay. The islands are closed to the public.

The Farallon Islands National Wildlife Refuge is one of 63 national wildlife refuges that have congressionally designated wilderness status. In 1974, the Farallon Wilderness was established (Public Law 93-550) and includes all islands except the Southeast Island for a total of 141 acres (57 ha). Additionally, waters surrounding the islands are protected as part of the Greater Farallones National Marine Sanctuary.

== History ==
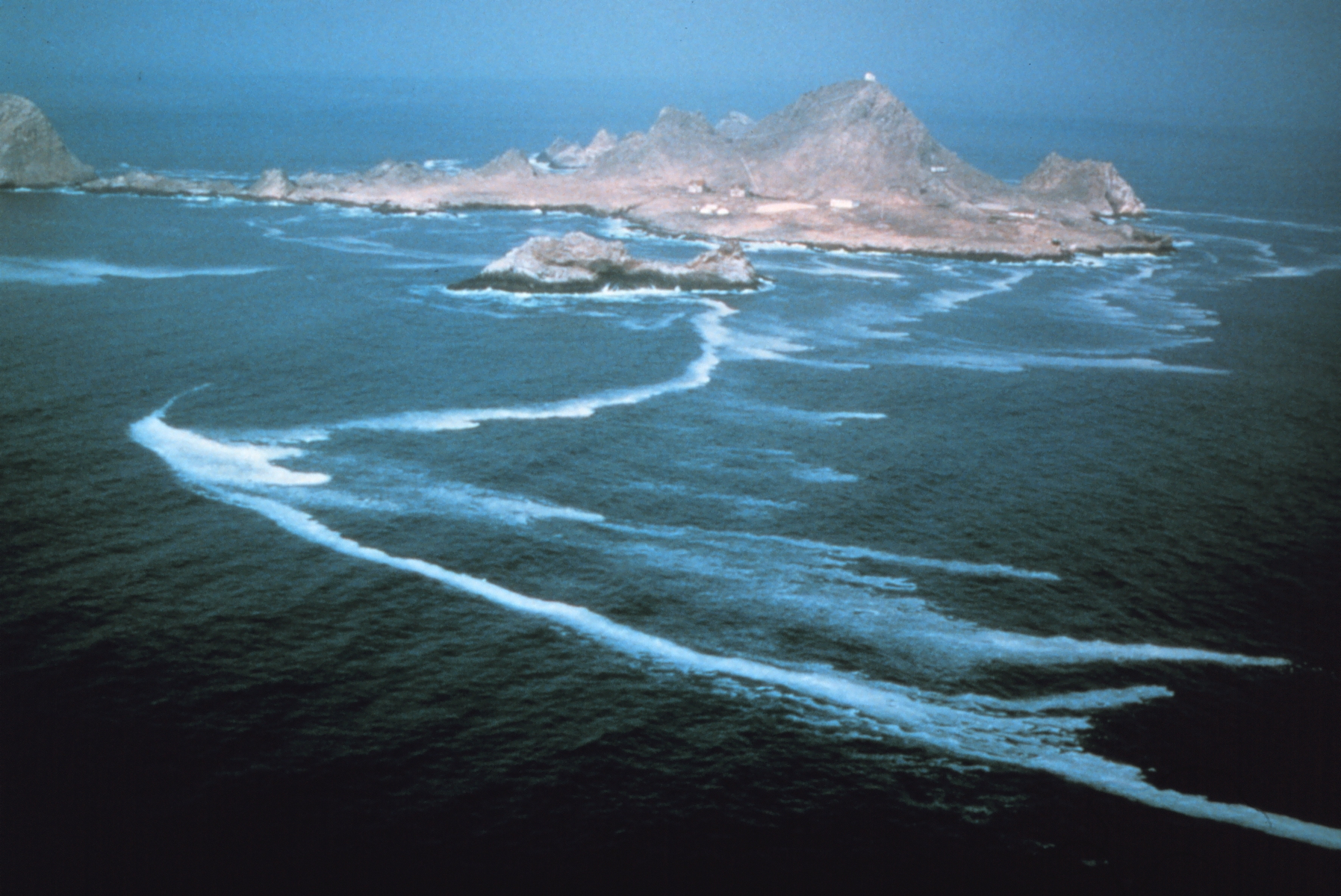
Aerial view of the Southeast Farallon Island from the south

The peaks of the Farallon Islands are visible from coastal areas of San Francisco and Marin County, so the Native Americans who lived in the San Francisco area were aware of them, and believed them to be an abode of the spirits of the dead. They are not believed to have traveled to the islands.

The first Europeans to see these islands were most probably the members of the Juan Cabrillo expedition of 1542, which sailed as far north as Point Reyes, but no source record of the Cabrillo expedition's actual sighting of these islands has survived. The first European to create a record of the islands that has survived was the English privateer and explorer Sir Francis Drake, on July 24, 1579. On that day, Drake landed on the islands to collect seal meat and bird eggs for his ship. He named them the Islands of Saint James because the day after his arrival was the feast day of St James the Great. The name of St James is now applied to only one of the rocky islets of the North Farallons.

The islands were apparently first given their names "Farallones" (literally, "cliffs") by Friar Antonio de la Ascencion, aboard the Spanish explorer Sebastián Vizcaíno's 1603 expedition. De la Ascension wrote in his diary, "Six leagues before reaching Punta de los Reyes (Point Reyes) is a large island, two leagues from land and three leagues northwest of this are . . . seven farallones close together." It is believed that probably for the next two centuries after Drake first recorded their existence, their rather ominous appearance, lying just off the entrance to San Francisco Bay, most likely caused the earlier mariners to prefer to skirt far to the west and offshore from the entrance to the bay, thus leading to the much later discovery of the San Francisco Bay by land over two centuries after the 1542 discovery of the islands. In 1769, the bay inlet was finally discovered soon after an overland sighting of the bay was made from what is now the Pacifica area.

In the years following the discovery of the islands, during the maritime fur trade era, the islands were exploited by seal hunters, first from New England and later from Russia. The Russians maintained a sealing station in the Farallones from 1812 to 1840, taking 1,200 to 1,500 fur seals annually, though American ships had already exploited the islands. The Albatross, captained by Nathan Winship, and the O'Cain, captained by his brother Jonathan Winship, were the first American ships sent from Boston in 1809 to establish a settlement on the Columbia River. In 1810, they met with two other American ships at the Farallon Islands, the Mercury and the Isabella, and at least 30,000 seal skins were taken. By 1818, the seals diminished rapidly until only about 500 could be taken annually and within the next few years, the fur seal was extirpated from the islands. Whether the northern fur seal or the Guadalupe fur seal were the islands' native fur seal is unknown, although the northern fur seal is the species that began to recolonize the islands in 1996.

On July 17, 1827, French sea captain Auguste Duhaut-Cilly sailed by the southernmost Farallon Island and counted the "crude dwellings of about a hundred Kodiaks stationed there by the Russians of Bodega...the Kodiaks, in their light boats, slip into San Francisco Bay by night, moving along the coast opposite the fort, and once inside this great basin, they station themselves temporarily on some of the inner islands, from where they catch the sea otter without hindrance."

After Alta California was ceded by Mexico to the United States in 1848 with the Treaty of Guadalupe Hidalgo, the islands' environment became linked to the growth of the city of San Francisco. Beginning in 1853, a lighthouse was constructed on SEFI. As the city grew, the seabird colonies came under severe threat as eggs were collected in the millions for San Francisco markets. The trade, which in its heyday could yield 500,000 eggs a month, was the source of conflict between the egg-collecting companies and the lighthouse keepers. This conflict turned violent in a confrontation between rival companies in 1863. The clash between two rival companies, known as the Egg War, left two men dead and marked the end of private companies on the islands, although the lighthouse keepers continued egging.

From 1902 to 1913, the former U.S. Weather Bureau maintained a weather station on the southeast island, which was connected with the mainland by cable. The results of the meteorological study were later published in a book on California's climate. Temperatures during those years never exceeded 90 °F (32 °C) or dropped to 32 °F (0 °C). Years later, the National Weather Service provided some weather observations from the lighthouse on its local radio station.

The islands have also been mentioned in connection with the schooner Malahat as one possible site for Rum Row during Prohibition.

A high-frequency direction finding (HFDF) station was established here by the Navy during World War II. These radio intercept sites along the coast could track Japanese warships and merchant marine vessels as far away as the Western Pacific. The other stations in California were at Point Arguello, Point Saint George, and San Diego. Bainbridge Island, Washington also hosted a station. The United States Coast Guard maintained a staffed lighthouse until 1972, when it was automated.

=== Nuclear waste dump ===
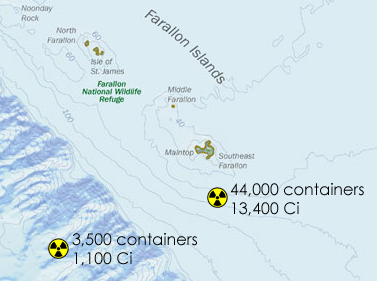
The above map indicates the approximate locations of two major nuclear waste dumping sites, according to a 1980 United States Environmental Protection Agency report.

From 1946 to 1970, the sea around the Farallones was used as a dump site for radioactive waste under the authority of the Atomic Energy Commission at a site known as the Farallon Island Nuclear Waste Dump. Most of the dumping took place before 1960, and all dumping of radioactive wastes by the United States was terminated in 1970. By then, 47,500 containers (55-gallon steel drums) had been dumped in the vicinity, with a total estimated radioactive activity of 14,500 Ci (540 TBq). The materials dumped were mostly laboratory materials containing traces of contamination. By 1980, most of the radiation had decayed.

Waste containers were shipped to Hunters Point Shipyard, then loaded onto barges for transportation to the Farallones. Containers were weighted with concrete. Those that floated were sometimes shot with rifles to sink them. 44,000 containers were dumped at 37°37′N 123°17′W, and another 3,500 at 37°38′N 123°08′W.

In January 1951, the highly radioactive hull of USS Independence, which was used in Operation Crossroads nuclear weapons testing and then loaded with barrels of radioactive waste, was scuttled in the area. Its wreck was rediscovered in 2015.

The exact current location of the containers and the potential hazard the containers pose to the environment are unknown. According to the US Environmental Protection Agency, attempts to remove the barrels would likely produce greater risk than leaving them undisturbed.

=== Shipwrecks ===
The islands are the site of many shipwrecks. The liberty ship SS Henry Bergh, a converted troop carrier, hit West End in 1944 (all hands were saved). The USS Conestoga, a US Navy tugboat that disappeared with its 56 crew members in 1921, was found in 2009 and positively identified in 2016. (The Conestoga had sailed from nearby San Francisco, but the waters of the Farallones were never searched because the vessel was assumed to have traveled far out into the Pacific.)

On the morning of August 5, 1941, a United States Coast Guard Douglas Dolphin, V-126, likely struck a rock pinnacle on the southeast Farallon island, causing the aircraft to burst into flames. All 3 crewmen aboard were killed.

Computer scientist Jim Gray was lost at sea after setting out on a solo sailing trip from San Francisco to the Farallones on January 28, 2007. Despite an unusually thorough search, neither his body nor his boat was ever found.

On April 14, 2012, the sailing yacht Low Speed Chase capsized during a race at Maintop Island, killing 5 of the 8 crew aboard.

=== Swimming records ===
Three people have successfully swum from the Farallones to the Golden Gate, with two more swimming to points north of the gate. The first, Ted Erikson, made the swim in September 1967, with the second, Joseph Locke, swimming to the Golden Gate on July 12, 2014, in 14 hours. The third person, and the first woman to complete the distance, Kimberley Chambers, made it in just over 17 hours on August 7, 2015.

In 2025 Catherine Breed, 32, of Mill Valley, became the seventh person—and the third woman—to complete the swim, setting a new record of 13 hours, 54 minutes and 10 seconds.

On May 11, 2024, Amy Appelhans Gubser became the first and only person to have swum in the outbound direction, from the Golden Gate to SE Farralone, in just over 17 hours.

In August 1967, Luciano "Blackie" Forner of the Point Richmond Water ski club, is the only person known to have water-skied from Pt. Richmond to the Farallon Islands.

== Protected area ==
The collecting of eggs, along with the threat of oil spills from San Francisco's shipping lanes, prompted President Theodore Roosevelt to sign Executive Order No. 1043 in 1909, creating the Farallon Reservation to protect the chain's northern islands. This was expanded to the other islands in 1969 when it became a national wildlife refuge. In 1981, Congress designated the Gulf of the Farallones National Marine Sanctuary, which spanned 1,279 square miles (3,313 square kilometers; 966 square nautical miles) of water surrounding the islands. This sanctuary protected open ocean, nearshore tidal flats, rocky intertidal areas, estuarine wetlands, subtidal reefs, and coastal beaches within its boundaries. In 2015, the sanctuary was enlarged north and west of the original boundary, partially surrounding Cordell Bank National Marine Sanctuary, to encompass 3,295 square miles (8,534 square kilometers; 2,488 square nautical miles), and the name was changed to Greater Farallones National Marine Sanctuary. The sanctuary is contiguous with both the Cordell Bank sanctuary and another sanctuary to the south, Monterey Bay National Marine Sanctuary. The islands are managed by the United States Fish and Wildlife Service, in conjunction with the Marin-based Point Blue Conservation Science (formerly Point Reyes Bird Observatory). The islands are currently the subject of long term ecological research. The Farallones are closed to the public, although birders and wildlife enthusiasts can approach them on whale watching boats, shark and marine policy education with the non profit Shark Stewards and the sail-training vessel Seaward out of Sausalito.

== Geology ==
The Farallon Islands are outcroppings of the Salinian Block, a vast geologic province of granitic continental crust sharing its origins with the core of the Sierra Nevada. The block was rifted off far to the south of its present position and moved north with the Pacific Plate on which the islands rest. Other nearby examples of the Salinian Block include the Point Reyes Peninsula and Bodega Head. The San Andreas Fault, marking a boundary zone between the Pacific and North American Plates, passes a few miles east of the islands.

The ancient Farallon Plate is named after the islands.

== Geography ==
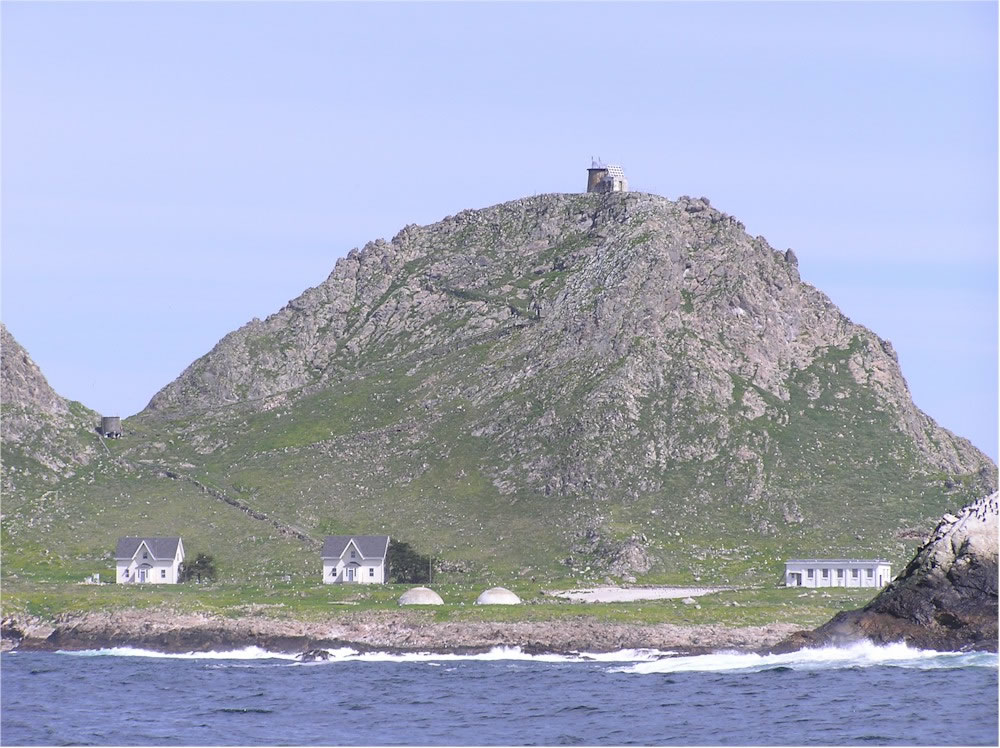
View of research station at Marine Terrace, with Farallon Island Light above

=== Overview ===
The islands string northwestward from Southeast Farallon Island for 5 miles (8.0 km). Their total land area is 0.16 square miles (0.41 km^{2}). The islands were initially exploited for bird eggs and fur seal skins, then used as a lighthouse station and a radio station. They have been protected in the Farallon Islands National Wildlife Refuge, first established in 1909 with the Southeast Farallons added in 1969, and contain the largest seabird colony in the U.S. outside of Alaska and Hawaii. The islands are part of the City and County of San Francisco, in Supervisorial District 4, mainly covering the Sunset District. They were formerly part of District 1 (The Richmond District).

Block Nr. (Note: of Block group 2, Census tract 604, San Francisco County, California)	Island(s) or Bank	Area (m^{2})	Height (m)	Coordinates
2000	South Farallon Islands	387,688	109	37°41′49″N 123°00′07″W
2001	Middle Farallon Island	3,362	6	37°43′37″N 123°01′52″W
2002	North Farallon Islands	28,270	47	37°45′37″N 123°05′49″W
–	Fanny Shoal	–	−4	37°46′40″N 123°10′19″W
2999 (Note: Block Number of Territorial Waters, with an area of 95½ sq. mi. (247,530,823 m^{2}))	Farallon Islands	419,320	109	

=== South Farallon Islands ===
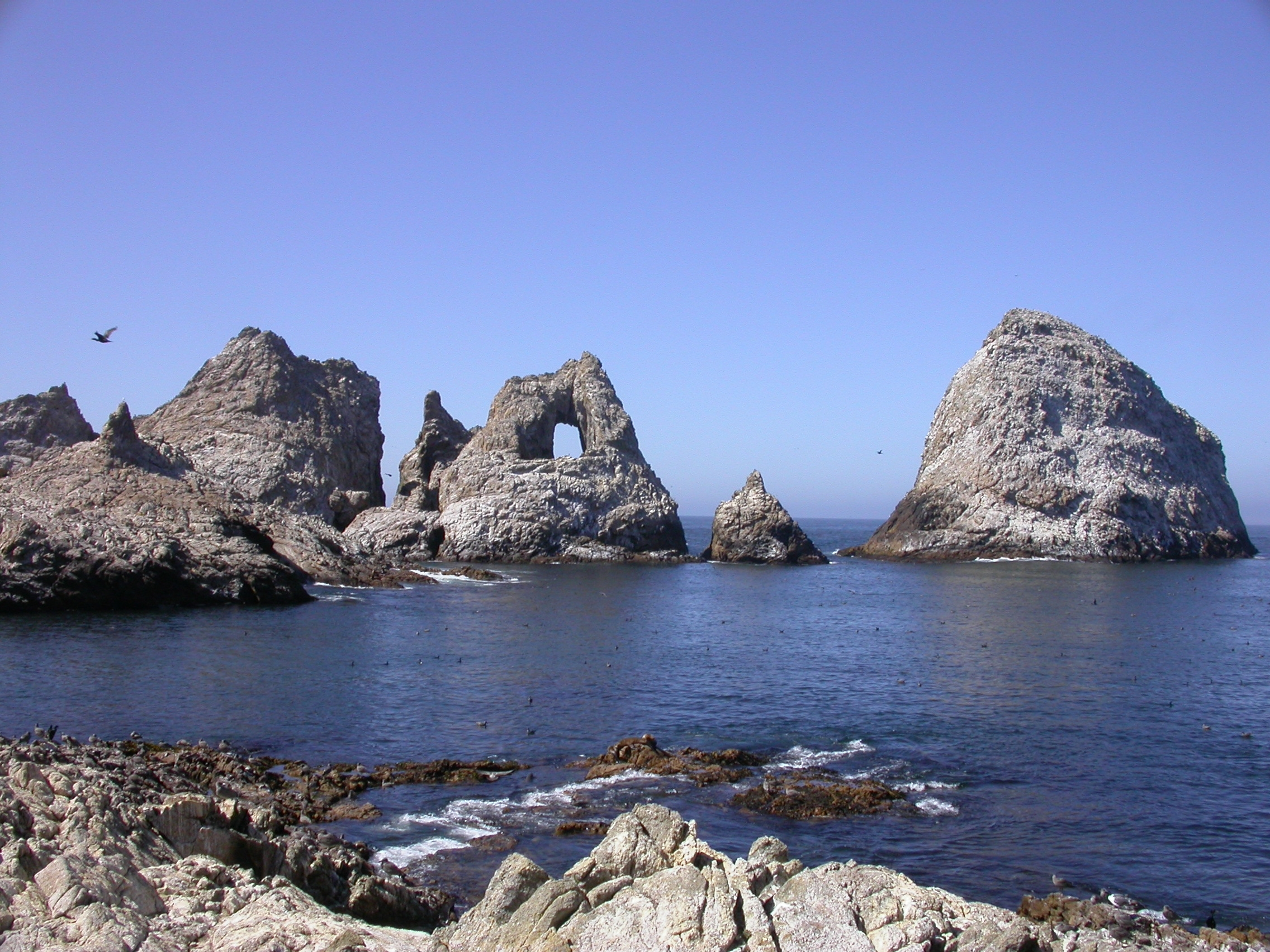
Aulon Island of Aulon Arch, Great Arch Rock and Sugarloaf, as seen from SEFI

- Southeast Farallon Island (SEFI) is the largest island, with an area of 95.79 acres or 0.14970 square miles (0.3877 km^{2}), and is the only inhabited one. The island is pyramidal in shape and 357 feet (109 m) high. The peak, Tower Hill (actually a double peak consisting of Lighthouse Hill and Little Lighthouse Hill), is the location of a lighthouse, the Farallon Island Light. The large flat area in the southeast of the island is called Marine Terrace. Immediately south of it is Mussel Flat, about 100 feet (30 m) by 400 feet (120 m), which is cut off from the main island only during high tide.
- Seal Rock (Saddle Rock), about 800 feet (240 m) south of SEFI, is about 350 feet (110 m) by 800 feet (240 m) in size and 80 feet (24 m) high.
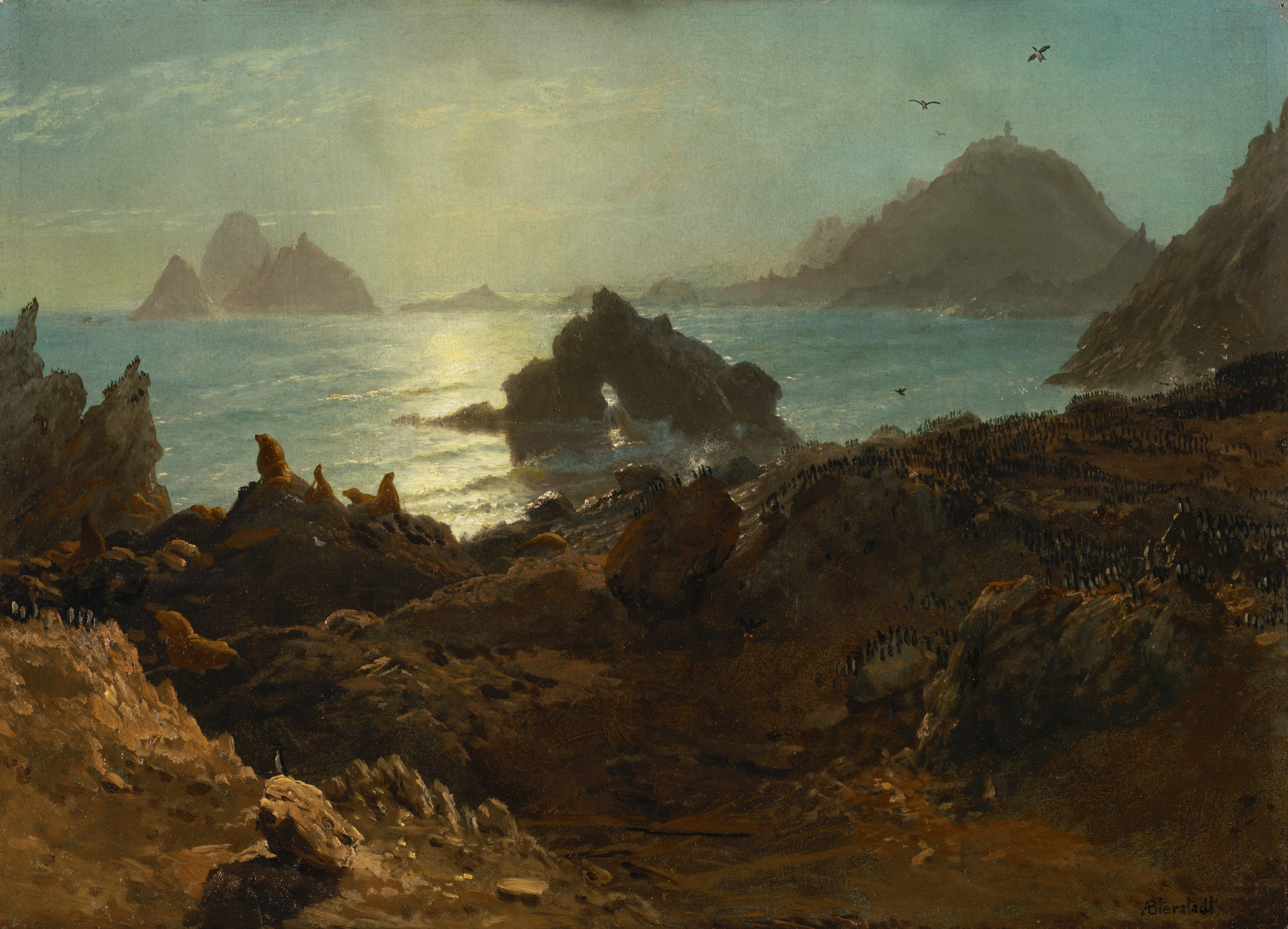
- Albert Bierstadt, Farallon Islands, 1872
  Maintop Island (West End) is immediately to the west of SEFI, separated by a narrow impassable gorge, The Jordan (Jordan Channel), which connects Mirounga Bay in the south to Maintop Bay in the north. It is the second largest island, and 220 feet (67 m) high at Main Top hill in its eastern part. The Great West Arch, or Aulon Arch, is a rock formation in the west of the island, and Indian Head is in the south.
- The Drunk Uncle Islets are a group of small rocks just northwest of Maintop Island.
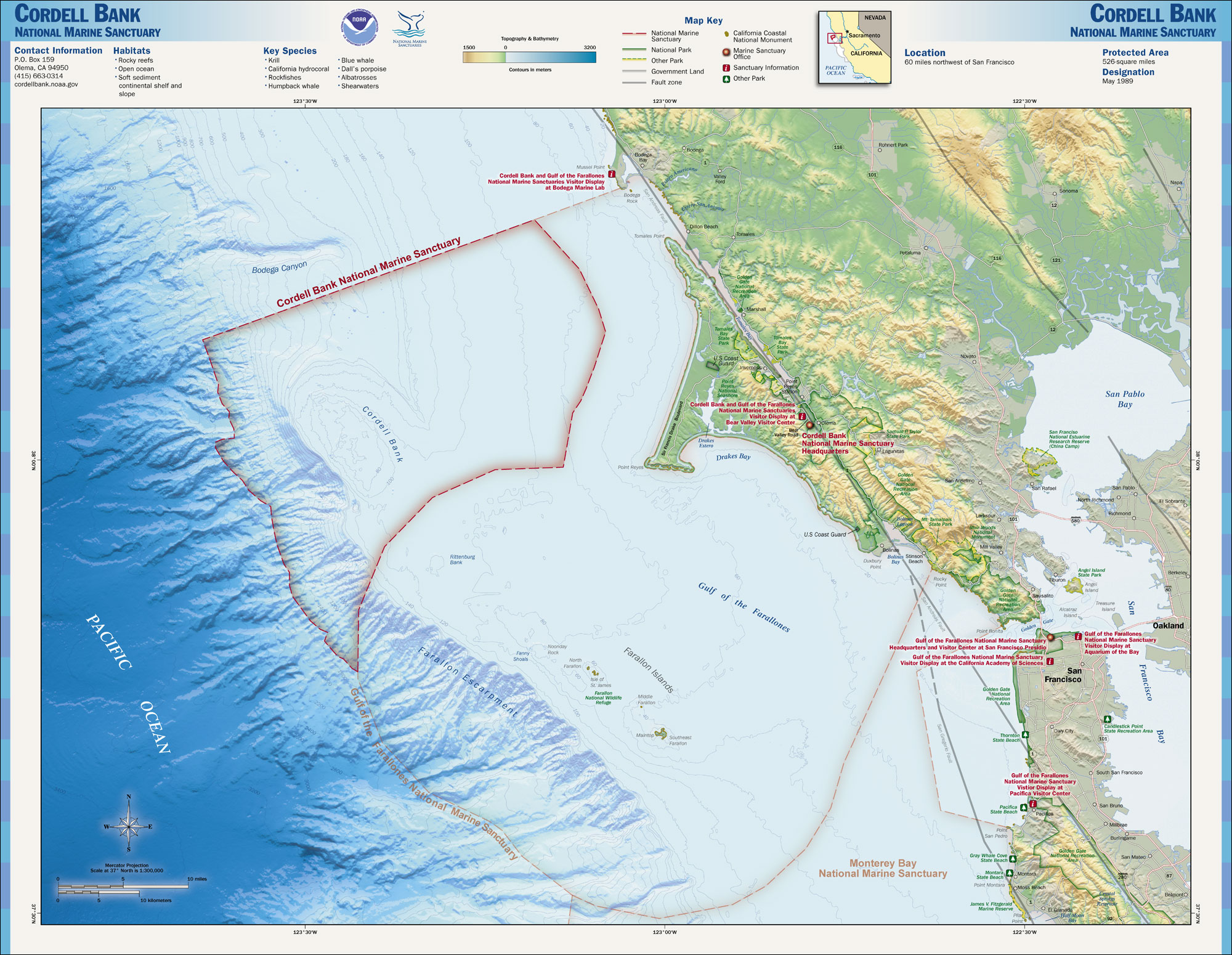
- Farallon Islands and banks further northwest
  Aulon Island and smaller Great Arch Rock (Arch Rock) are immediately north of the northern tip of SEFI, and together about 200 feet (61 m) by 350 feet (110 m) in size. They are barely separated by a narrow gorge. Great Arch Rock is not to be confused with Great West Arch, a rock formation in the west of Maintop Island.
- Sugarloaf Island (usually just referred to as Sugarloaf) is northeast of Great Arch Rock, and just slightly larger in size, with a height of 80 feet (24 m). Southwest of Aulon Island, Great Arch Rock and Sugarloaf Island, and in the northeast of SEFI, is protected Fisherman Bay.
- Sea Lion Rock is just northwest of Aulon Island, diameter approximately 130 feet (40 m).
- Hurst Shoal is located about 1000 yards (one kilometer) southeast of the southeastern corner of SEFI. It has a least depth of 20 feet (6.1 m).

=== Middle Farallon Island ===
Middle Farallon Island, 2 miles (3.2 km) northwest of SEFI, is a 20-foot (6.1 m) high guano-covered black rock about 210' (65 meters) in diameter, with an area of ¾ acre (3,362 m^{2}). This island is informally known as "the pimple."

=== North Farallon Islands ===
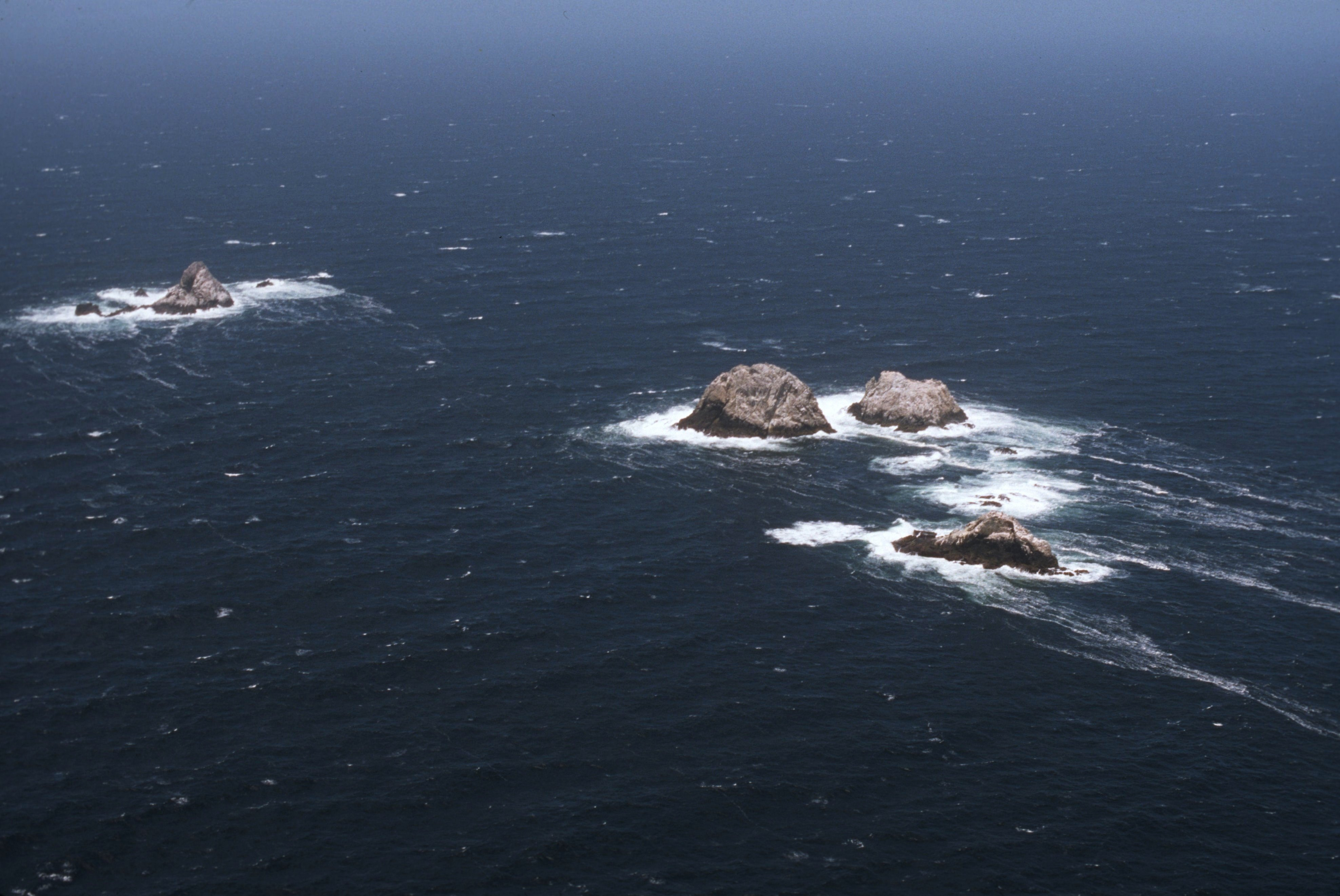
North Farallon Islands seen from south

North Farallon Islands, about 5 miles (7 km) further northwest, consist of two clusters of bare precipitous islets and rocks 100' to 280' (31 to 85 meters) high, with an aggregate area of 7 acres (28,270 m^{2})

- North Farallon Island, 102' (31 meters) high, about 500' (150 meters) long north–south, 2¼ acres (9,260 m^{2})37.771699°N 123.107119°W
- Island of St. James, 150' (47 meters) high, about 410' (125 meters) in diameter, 3 acres (12,380 m^{2})37.767215°N 123.100275°W
- unnamed rock, about 280' (85 meters) in diameter, and 1½ acres (5,640 m^{2}) in area37.767688°N 123.099161°W
- four smaller unnamed rocks, diameter 70' (20 meters) and less

Some of those unnamed rocks, however, have Spanish names, such as Piedra Guadalupe, Peñasco Quebrado and Farallón Vizcaíno.

=== Fanny Shoal ===
3 miles (5 km) WNW of the North Farallones is Fanny Shoal, a bank 2 miles (3 km) in extent, with depth less than 180' (55 meters), marking the northernmost and westernmost feature of the group, albeit entirely submerged. Noonday Rock, which rises abruptly from a depth of 120' (37 meters), with a least depth of 4 meters (13 feet) over it at low tide, is the shallowest point of Fanny Shoal. There is a lighted bell buoy about 1000 yards (1 km) west of Noonday Rock. Noonday Rock, formerly known as Fanny Rock, derives its name from that of the clipper ship that struck it on January 1, 1863, and sank within one hour.

=== Banks northwest of Fanny Shoal ===
The banks northwest of Fanny Shoal are not considered part of the Farallon Islands anymore, and they are outside of U.S. territorial waters. About 15 miles (25 km) northwest of Fanny Shoal is Cordell Bank, a significant marine habitat (38°01′N 123°25′W). About halfway between Fanny Shoal and Cordell Bank is Rittenburg Bank, with depths of less than 260' (80 meters) (37°53′N 123°18′W).

=== Climate ===
Although the Farallon Islands do not have an official weather station, satellite measurements indicate a very mild mediterranean climate due to its offshore position in the midst of the very cold California Current. The cold waters also make it rather chilly during most of the year for a piece of land on the 37°N latitude. During San Francisco's and Oakland's above 100 °F (38 °C) record heat wave of 1 September 2017, the aggregate weather around the Farallon Islands remained below 68 °F (20 °C). The islands are also subject to occasional, heavy, offshore winds in winter. Due to the absence of a warming nearby landmass and the cold water, winters remain mild but often cooler than San Francisco also during that time of year. Winter lows below 50 °F (10 °C) are very rare in the area. Summer highs seldom rise far above 60 °F (16 °C).

== Flora and fauna ==
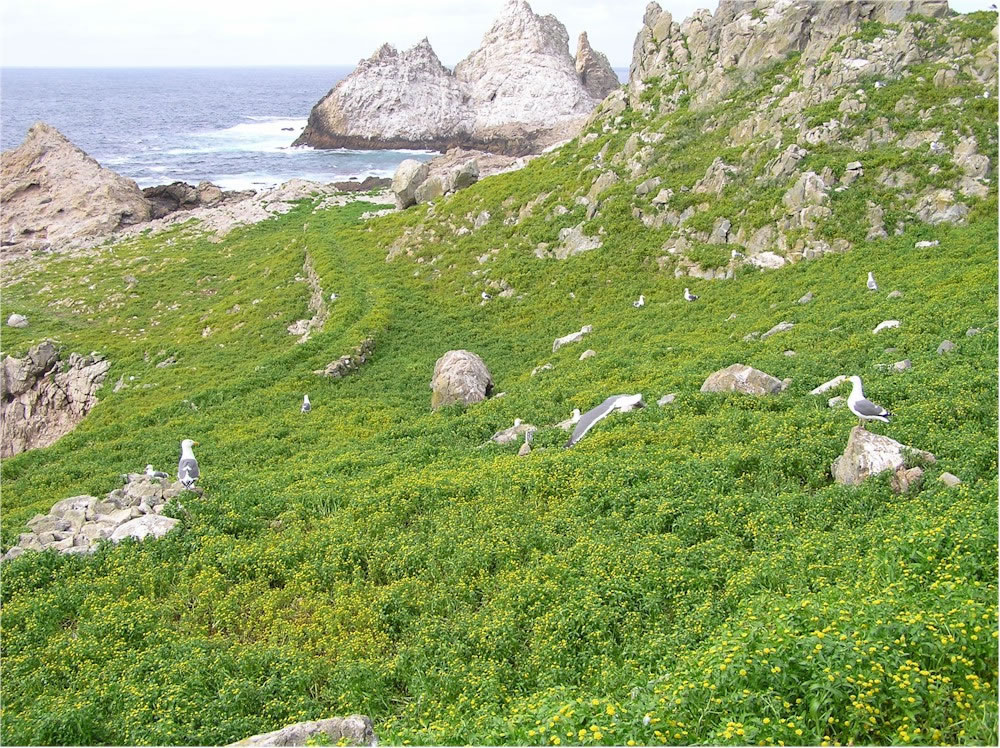
A hillside covered in Farallon weed

=== Plants ===
The first recorded survey of the plants on the Farallon Islands was on July 3–6, 1892 by Joseph William Blankinship. He found 11 native plants and 17 introduced plants as the island had already been greatly changed by human activity. Further surveys were by Robert Ornduff in May 1960 and Malcolm Coulter from 1968–1971. One of the most common is the native maritime goldfields (Lasthenia maritima), known locally as Farallon weed. In 1978 Coulter published additions observations, bringing the total number of species to 50, of these 18 are native and 32 are introduced. Only South Farallon has been surveyed for plants, but scientists think that the flora on the other islands and rocks will be similar to the plants found on the cliffs.

Native plants:

- Amsinckia spectabilis – First reported by Ornduff, it grows in scattered areas in the southern and southeastern parts of South Farallon and near the old tram tracks.
- Bromus maritimus – Not found until 1975 by Coulter, it grows in a few patches south of the lighthouse.
- Calandrinia ciliata – First reported by Coulter in 1971, small numbers grow along the tram tracks.
- Claytonia perfoliata – Reported by Blankinship and Ornduff, found along the tram tracks by Coulter
- Crassula connata var. connata (as Crassula erecta) – Reported by Blankinship, Ornduff, and Coulter, found in the eastern part of South Farallon where the soils are fine and gravelly. Also found around the living quarters on the island.
- Erigeron glaucus – Reported by Blankinship, Ornduff, and Coulter, grows sparsely on the rocky cliffs of South Farallon.
- Heliotropium curassavicum var. oculatum – First recorded by Coulter growing in a small area near the carpentry shop.
- Juncus bufonius – Reported by Blankinship and Ornduff, viable seeds found in 1975
- Lasthenia maritima (as Lasthenia minor subsp. maritima) – The most widespread plant on South Farallon, only occasionally amoung the rocks, but thickly on both northern and southern areas of the island.
- Montia fontana subsp. fontana (as Montia hallii) – First observed in 1972, it is found along the path going to the top of Lighthouse Hill.
- Phyllospadix torreyi – A saltwater adapted plant recorded by Blankinship, but only Robert Setzer found a specimen on the island that was reported by Coulter in 1971.
- Plagiobothrys scouleri var. scouleri (as Plagiobothrys reticulatus var. rossianorum) – Reported by Blankinship and Ornduff, found with Crassula connata in areas where the soils are fine and gravelly.
- Psilocarphus tenellus – Reported by Blankinship and Ornduff, rediscovered in the southeast of the island after being missed in 1968
- Sagina decumbens subsp. occidentalis – Reported by Blankinship and Ornduff, rediscovered in the southeast of the island after being missed in 1968
- Spergularia macrotheca – Found by Blankinship, Ornduff, and Coulter, it commonly grows amoung the rocks and on thin soils. In can be found the north on Lighthouse Hill and in the southwest and southeast.
- Spergularia marina – Reported by Blankinship and possibly mistaken for another plant by Ornduff, also on thin soils but in southern and southeastern areas.
- Trifolium fucatum – First recorded by Coulter in 1971, it was then found in two patches between the power house and living quarters.
- Trifolium variegatum – Also first recorded by Coulter in 1971, one population was located near the living quareters and other on the path to the power house.

=== Seabirds ===
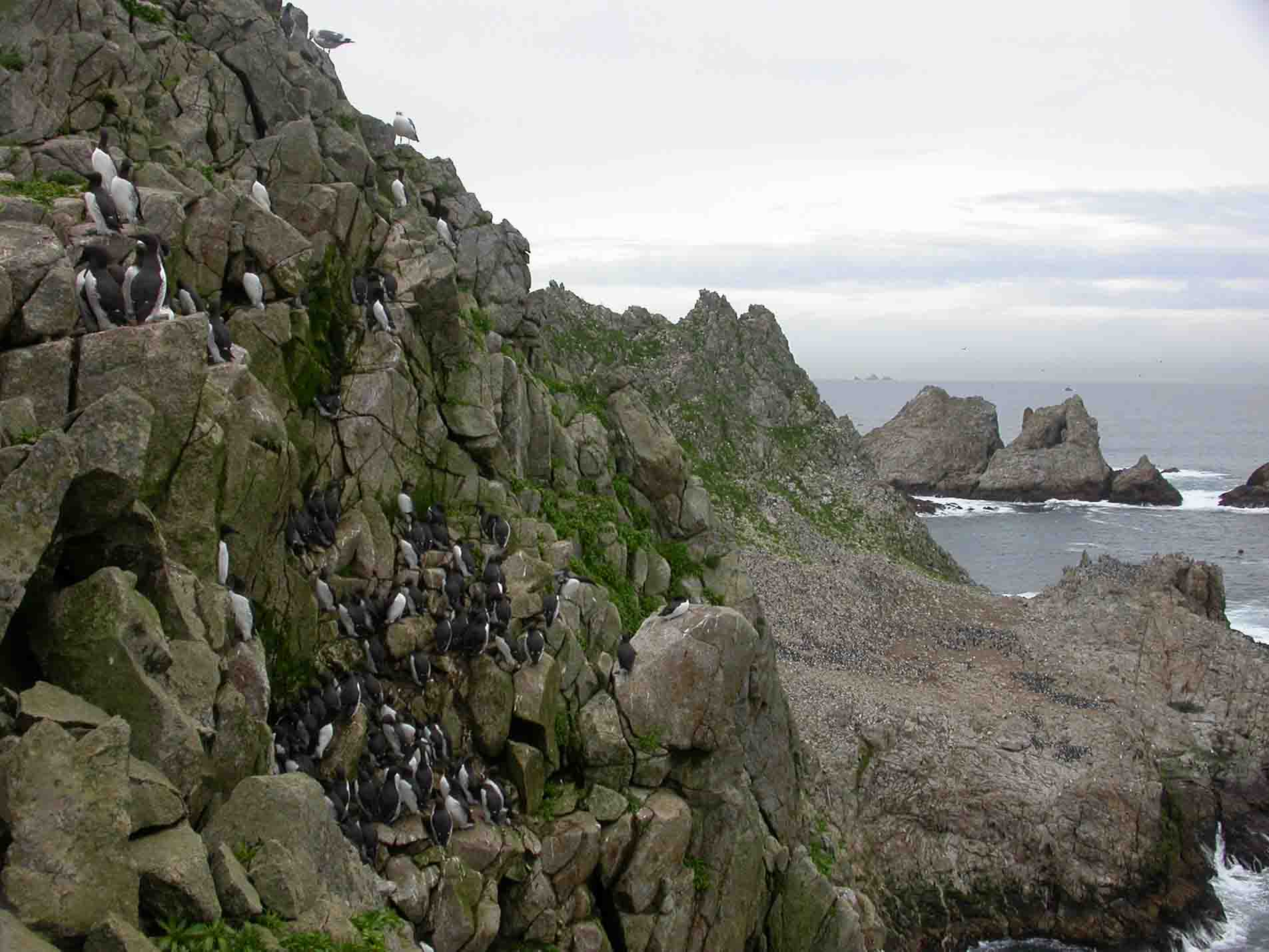
Common murre colony on the Farallones

The Farallon Islands are an important reserve protecting a huge seabird colony. The islands' position in the highly productive California Current and eastern Pacific upwelling region, as well as the absence of other large islands that would provide suitable nesting grounds, result in a seabird population of over 250,000. Twelve species of seabird and shorebird nest on the islands; western gull, Brandt's cormorant, pelagic cormorant, double-crested cormorant, pigeon guillemot, common murre, Cassin's auklet, tufted puffin, black oystercatcher, rhinoceros auklet, ashy storm-petrel, and Leach's storm-petrel. Since the islands were protected, common murres, which once numbered nearly 500,000 pairs but suffered from the egg collecting, oil spills and other disturbances that had greatly reduced their numbers, recovered and climbed from 6,000 birds to 160,000. Additionally, since protection, the locally extinct rhinoceros auklet has begun to breed on the islands again. The island has the world's largest colonies of western gulls and ashy storm petrels, the latter species being considered endangered and a conservation priority. The island also is the wintering ground of several species of migrants, and regularly attracts vagrant birds (about 430 species of bird have been recorded on or around the island).

=== Seals ===
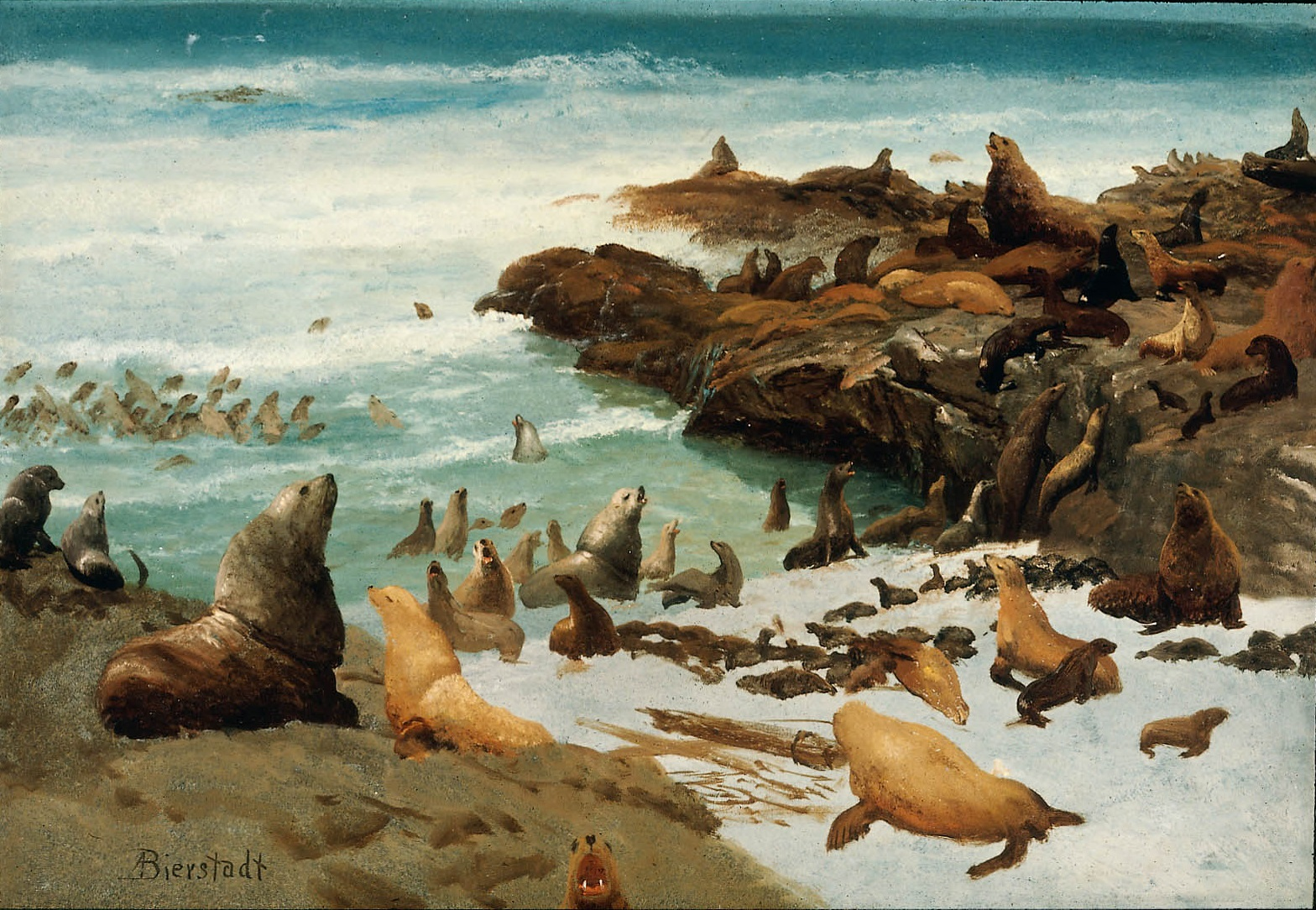
Seal Rocks, Farallons, oil painting by Albert Bierstadt (1872)

Five species of pinniped come to shore on the islands, and in some cases breed. These are the northern elephant seal, harbor seal, Steller's sea lion, California sea lion, and the northern fur seal (the last of which, like the rhinoceros auklet, began to return to the island again after protection).

Sealers took 150,000 northern fur seals (Callorhinus ursinus) from the Farallons between 1810 and 1813, followed by Russian fur hunters who lived on the Farallons and extirpated the pinnipeds from the islands. In 1996 West End Island became the fourth American northern fur seal rookery when a pup was born. The recolonizers bore tags from San Miguel Island in the Channel Islands, which had been itself recolonized in 1968. By 2006, nearly 100 pups were born. The fur seals are aggressive and have displaced larger sea lions from their territory. The high count for 2011 was 476 individuals, a 69 percent increase from the year before. By 2016, the pup count alone was 1,126, reflecting a 21% average (but highly variable) annual increase in new pups over the 21 years since recolonization. If the South Farallon Islands population reaches its estimated historical size of 100,000 individuals, it could account for approximately one-fifth of the world's northern fur seal population.

Northern elephant seals (Mirounga angustirostris) recolonized the refuge in 1959 with a confirmed pup in 1972. The elephant seal rookery on Southeast Farallon has probably reached carrying capacity.

=== Whales ===
Several species of cetaceans are found near the Farallon Islands, most frequently gray whales, blue whales, and humpback whales. Blue whales and humpback whales are most frequently found near the islands in the summer and fall, when strong upwelling may support a rich pelagic food web. Killer whales are also found around the islands. Gray whales are reliably found near the Farallones during their spring migration north and the fall and winter migration south. Some gray whales may also be found during the summer, when a few whales skip the trip north to Alaska and spend the summer months off the coast of Canada and the continental United States.

In December 2005, one humpback was rescued from netting entanglement east of the Farallones by staff of The Marine Mammal Center. The last sighting of another humpback, Humphrey, was near the Farallones in 1991. The islands are in the Gulf of the Farallones National Marine Sanctuary, which protects the feeding grounds of the wildlife of the refuge.

=== Sharks ===
The elephant seal population attracts a population of great white sharks to the islands. In 1970, Farallon biologists witnessed their first shark attack, on a Steller's sea lion. During the next fifteen years, more than one hundred attacks on seals and sea lions were observed at close range. By the year 2000, biologists were logging almost eighty attacks in a single season.

While the males return annually, the females return only every other year, often with fresh, deep bites around their heads. The seasonal shark population at the Farallones is unclear, with estimates from thirty to one hundred. The Farallones are unique in the size of the great whites that are attracted. The average length of a full-grown great white shark is 4 to 4.8 metres (13 to 16 ft), with a weight of 680 to 1,100 kg (1,500 to 2,430 lb), females generally being larger than males. Farallon great whites range between the "smaller" males at 13 ft (4.0 m) to the females, which generally range between 17 and 19 ft (5.2 and 5.8 m). (For comparison, the largest accurately measured great white shark was a female caught in August 1988 at Prince Edward Island off the North Atlantic coast and measured 20.3 ft (6.2 m).) A killer whale was recorded killing a great white near the Farallones in 1997. Over the decades of study, many of the individual white sharks visiting the Farallones have been nicknamed, often based on their scars and appearances, such as Gouge, The Hunchback, The Jester, and Stumpy. Stumpy, an 18-foot female great white, in particular was well known for her appearance in the BBC documentary "Great White Shark" narrated by David Attenborough and stock footage of her attacks on decoys is often utilized in more recent documentaries, and another example, Tom Johnson, a 16-foot male white shark that was featured in an episode of the 2012 season of Shark Week called "Great White Highway", is believed to be the oldest living white shark so far documented returning to the Farallones, estimated at 25–30 years old.

Some individual sharks have been tagged and found to roam the Pacific as far as Hawaii and Guadalupe Island off Baja California, returning regularly to the Farallones every year in the autumn. Satellite tracking has revealed the majority of great white sharks from the Farallones (and from other parts of California, Hawaii and the west coast of Mexico) migrate to an area of ocean dubbed the White Shark Café, 1,500 miles (2,400 km) west of Ensenada, Baja California. The peak of activity at this location is from mid-April to Mid-July, but some sharks spend up to eight months of the year there. This island has many migratory sharks return to its waters every year.

=== Rodents ===
The islands have tens of thousands of invasive house mice that are wreaking havoc on the native ecosystem. An average of 500 Eurasian house mice occupy each of its 120 acres (49 ha), with an approximate total population of 60,000.

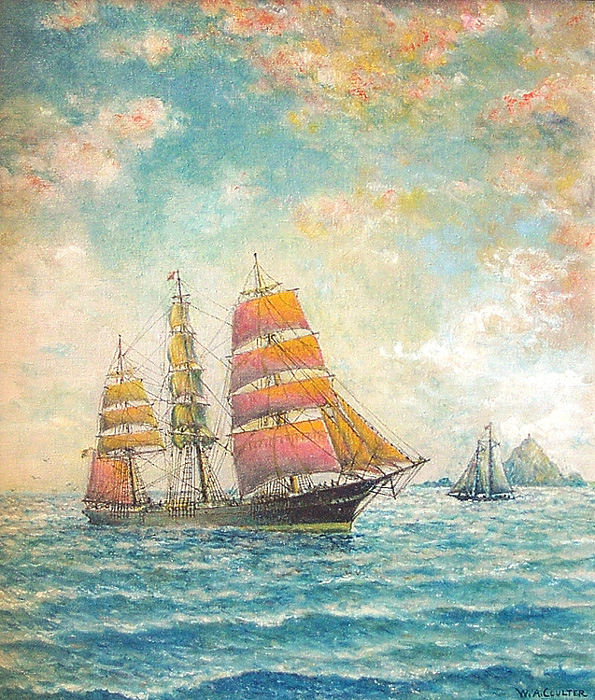
Waiting for the Pilot (Off The Farralon Islands), 1905 painting

== In literature and the arts ==
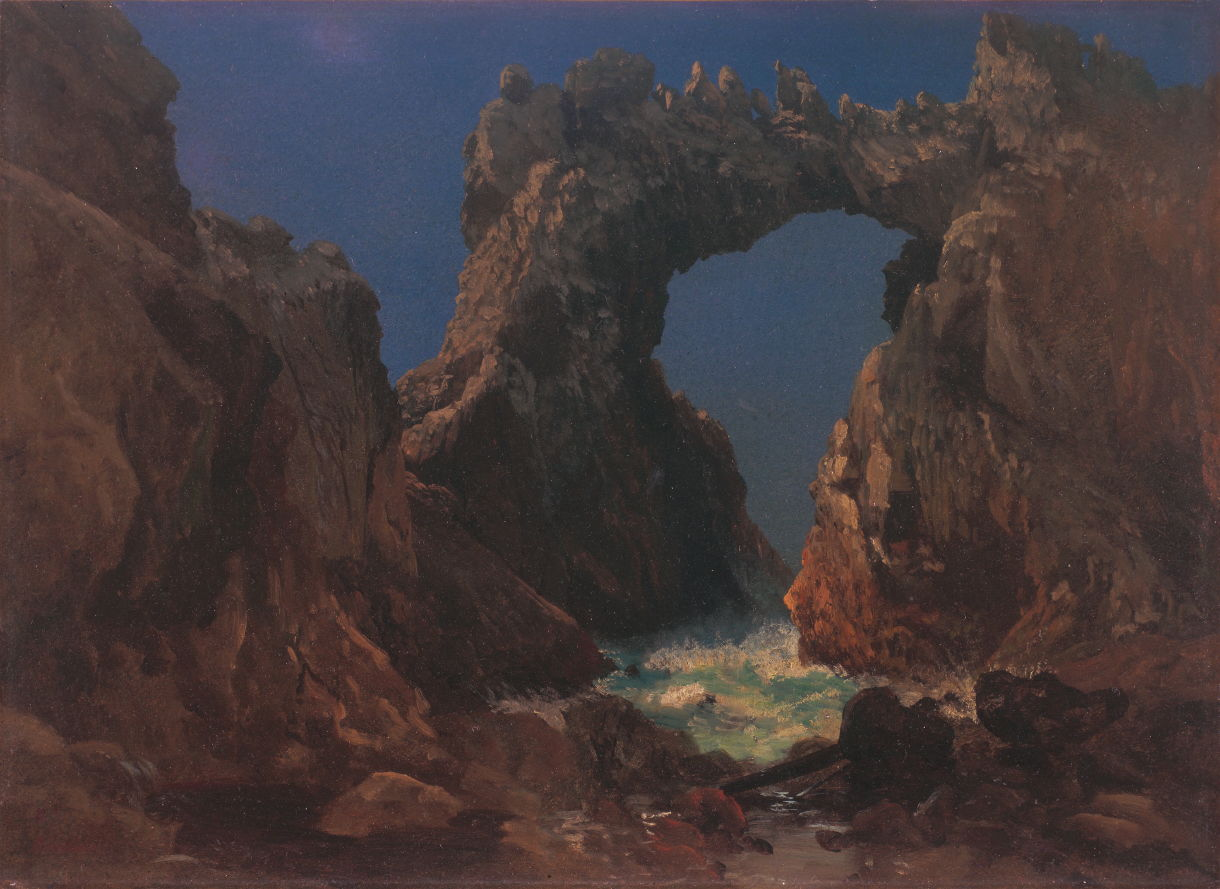
Albert Bierstadt, Farallon Islands, California, 1872

The Farallones are briefly mentioned in Chapter 2 of Jack London's 1904 novel The Sea-Wolf as the location of the schooner Ghost. Mr. Johnson gives this position of the ship to Humphrey Van Weyden.

In 2005, Susan Casey, a Canadian journalist, published a nonfiction book about the Farallon Islands called The Devil's Teeth: A True Story of Obsession and Survival Among America's Great White Sharks. After becoming interested in the sharks and island in a documentary, she joins the scientists working and living at the Farallon Islands during shark season. She returns later for an 8 week stint despite regulations and legal hoops. The book also details the history of the island including the Farallon Egg War and other motivations that have brought people to the Farallon Islands over the years.

Abby Geni's 2016 novel The Lightkeepers is set on the Farallon Islands.

The Farallon Islands and their role in the Egg War of the Gold Rush era are documented in the 2017 The Kitchen Sisters Present podcast episode "Egg Wars", in the 2019 episode "The Egg Wars" on the comedy podcast The Dollop, and in the 2020 Behind the Bastards podcast episode "The War of the Eggs".

== See also ==
- Channel Islands of California

== Sources ==
- Casey, Susan (June 7, 2005). The Devil's Teeth: A True Story of Obsession and Survival Among America's Great White Sharks. Henry Holt and Company. ISBN 978-0-8050-7581-6. WP article
- White, Peter (1995). The Farallon Islands: Sentinels of the Golden Gate. San Francisco, California: Scottwall Associates. ISBN 978-0-942087-10-9.
- Ainley, David G. (1990). Seabirds of the Farallon Islands: Ecology, Dynamics, and Structure of an Upwelling-system Community. Stanford University Press. ISBN 978-0-8047-1530-0.
