= Malahat =

Malahat is the name of a Coast Salish group on southern Vancouver Island, British Columbia, Canada. Their name today may refer to:

== Government ==
- Malahat First Nation, the First Nations band government of the Malahat located on southeastern Vancouver Island

== Places ==
- Malahat, British Columbia, an unincorporated area of Vancouver Island, Canada
- Malahat railway station, in Malahat, British Columbia, Canada
- Malahat-Juan de Fuca, a former electoral district Legislative Assembly of British Columbia

== Transportation ==
- Malahat (highway), a portion of British Columbia Highway 1 linking Greater Victoria to the rest of Vancouver Island
- Malahat (schooner), a five-masted ship also known as "The Queen of Rum Row"
- Malahat (train), now known as the Victoria–Courtenay train, a passenger service on Vancouver Island operated by Via Rail

== Military ==
- HMCS Malahat, a recruitment and training center for sailors of the Canadian Naval Reserve in Victoria, BC
