= Sour clover =

Sour clover is a common name for several plants and may refer to:

- Melilotus indicus, native to Europe and Africa and widely naturalized
- Oxalis stricta, native to eastern North America and Asia, widely naturalized
- Trifolium fucatum, native to western North America

== See also ==
- Oxalis
