= Farallon Island Light =

Lighthouse in California, United States

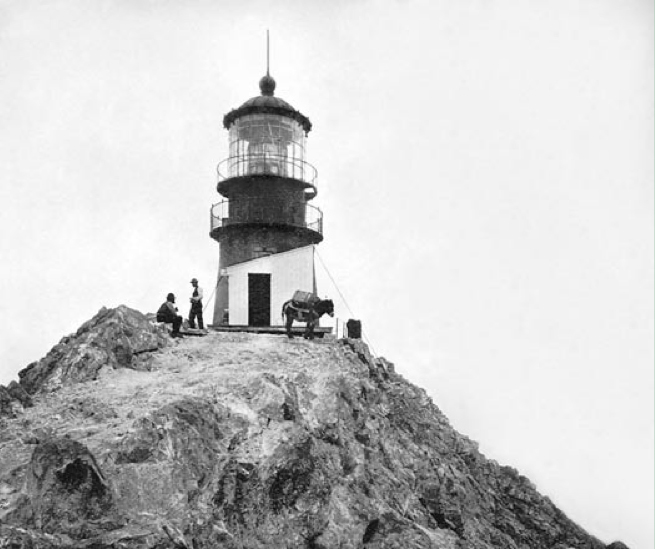
- Historic photo of Farallon Island Light, with mule (USCG)
- Location: Farallon Island; California; United States
- Coordinates: 37.698966°N 123.001651°W

Tower
- Constructed: 1855
- Foundation: brick basement
- Construction: brick tower
- Automated: 1972
- Height: 41 feet (12 m)
- Shape: tapered cylindrical tower with balcony and lantern removed
- Markings: white tower
- Operator: Farallon National Wildlife Refuge

Light
- Focal height: 358 feet (109 m)
- Lens: First order Fresnel lens (original), Vega VRB aerobeacon (current)
- Range: 14 nmi (26 km; 16 mi)
- Characteristic: Fl W 15s.

Farallon Island Light is a lighthouse on Southeast Farallon Island, California. One of the highest lights in California, it was constructed in 1855 to warn ships approaching San Francisco from the west away from the rocky islands. In later years it was shorn of its lantern, but it remains in use.

== History ==
Farallon Island Light was constructed on Southeast Farallon Island. After the tower was complete, it proved too small to house a first-order Fresnel lens, and the tower had to be torn down and rebuilt. The lighthouse was lit for the first time in December 1855. In 1939, the United States Coast Guard took over the lighthouse when the United States Lighthouse Service merged with it. The Coast Guard maintained a presence until 1972. By that time, the lantern room and the Fresnel lens had been removed, and an automated aero beacon was placed on the tower. The lens is on display in the San Francisco Maritime National Historic Park visitor center on Hyde Street, while the lantern room itself was scrapped after removal.

From the Coast Guard web site:

This lighthouse is situated on the highest peak of the southeast Farallon. It was built in 1855 in the busy days which followed the gold rush when clipper ships and other sailing vessels were sailing in to San Francisco in large numbers. That there was need for a light on these dangerous rocks is evident when clippers like the Golden City which sailed from New York in 1852 reported that she was detained 5 days off the Farallons in fog. Stone for the construction of the lighthouse was quarried on the island and inside this masonry was a lining of brick. The extremely sharp slopes of the island and the jagged nature of the rock were serious obstacles to construction work. The bricks used in the tower were carried up the rock in bundles of four and five on the backs of men. After the completion of the tower a mule was kept on the island for years to carry supplies between the various parts of the station. At one time this mule was the oldest inhabitant. A number of years ago the gathering of birds’ eggs, which were sold on the San Francisco market, was carried on here extensively and seals were also hunted commercially. These practices were finally terminated by the Federal Government. The Farallon Light Station was equipped with a radiobeacon as well as with a powerful light and fog signal.

== Gallery ==
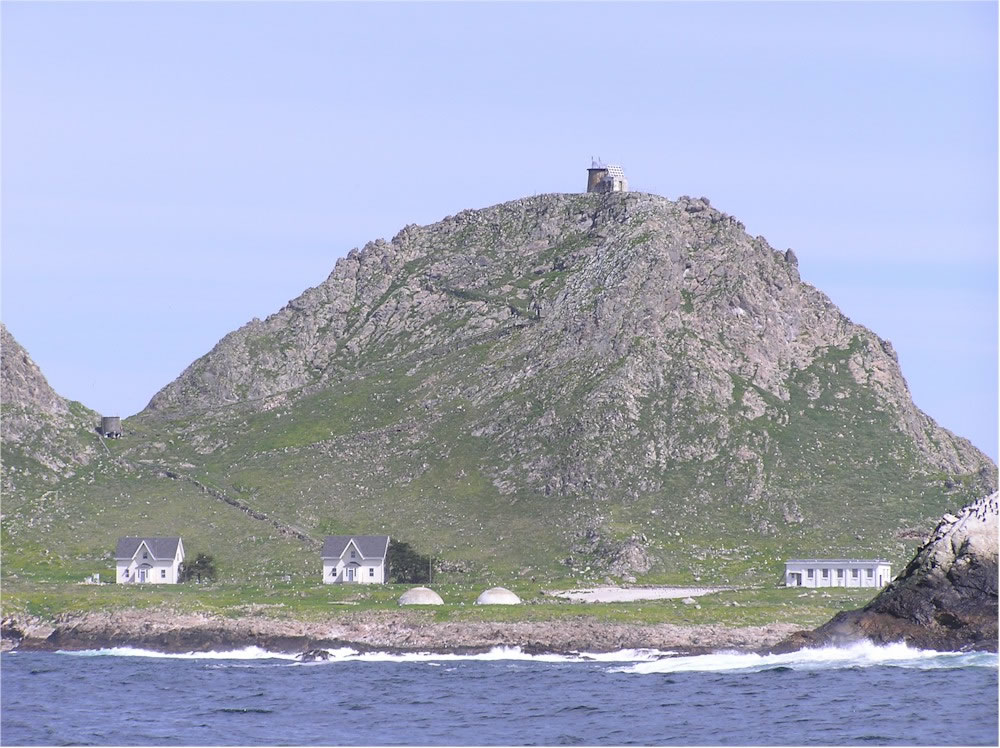
View of Farallon Island Light, with research station below

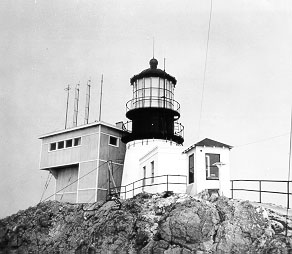
Farallon Light Tower with Lantern Room – U.S. Coast Guard Archive

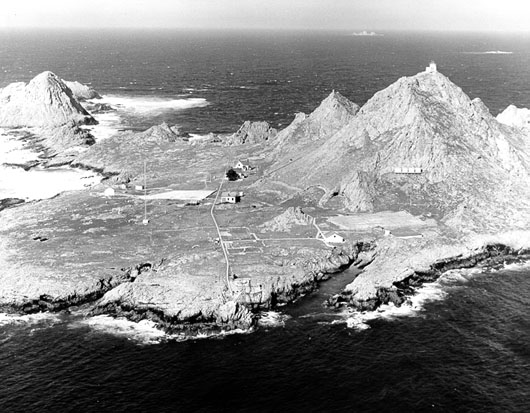
Farallon Light Tower without Lantern Room – U.S. Coast Guard Archive

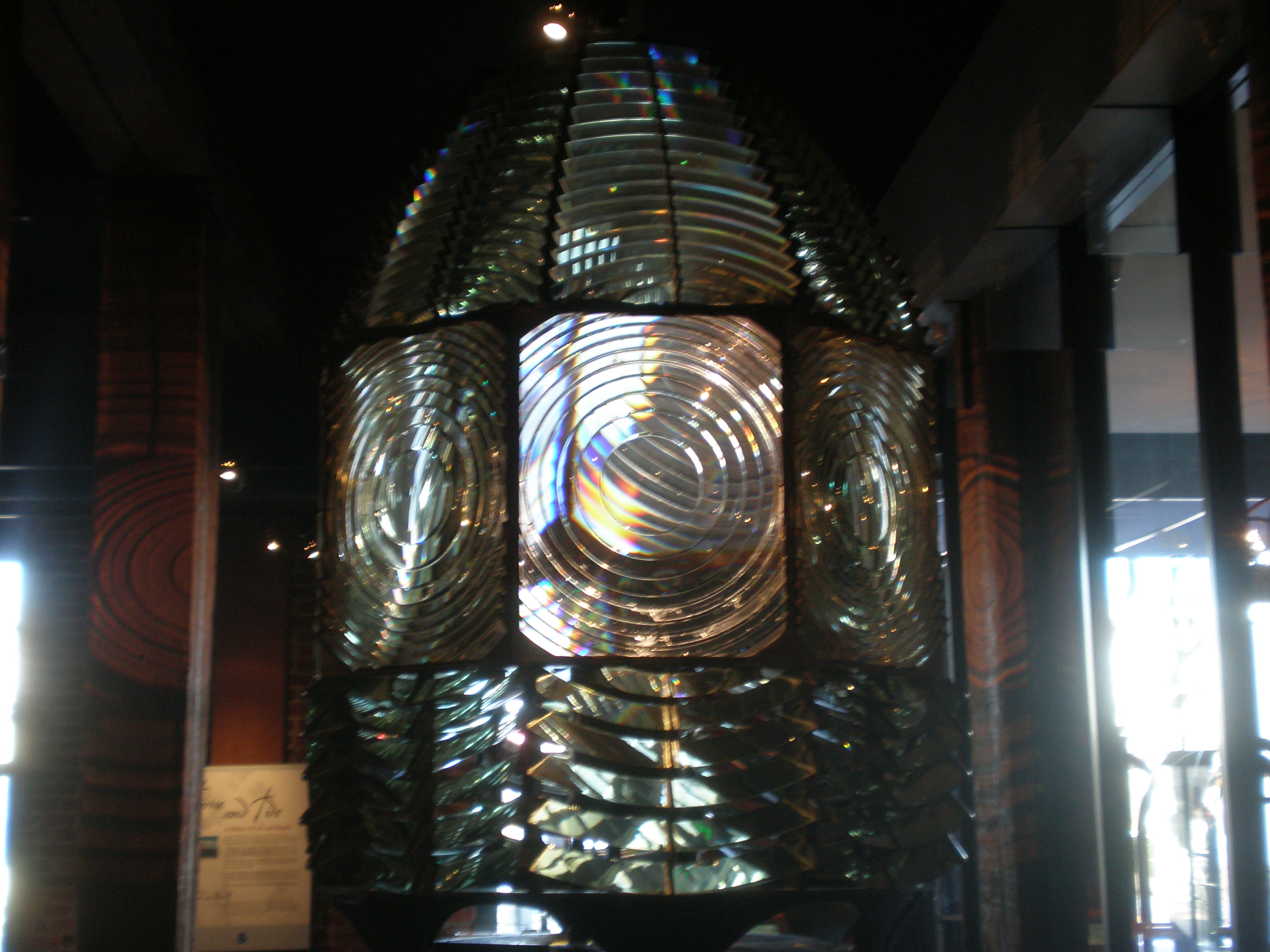
The Farallon Island lens, on display in San Francisco

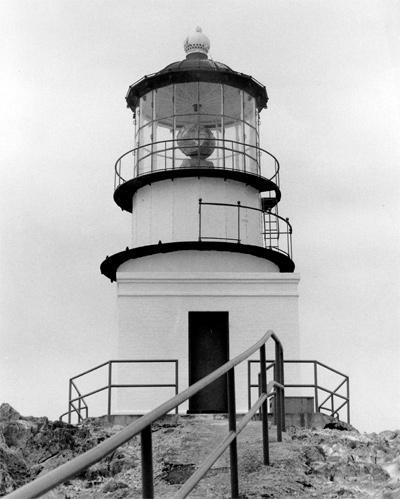
The Farallon Island Light, after lens removal, but before lens room removal

== See also ==
- List of lighthouses in the United States
- Farallon Islands
