= Gertrude Lythgoe =

American rum-runner

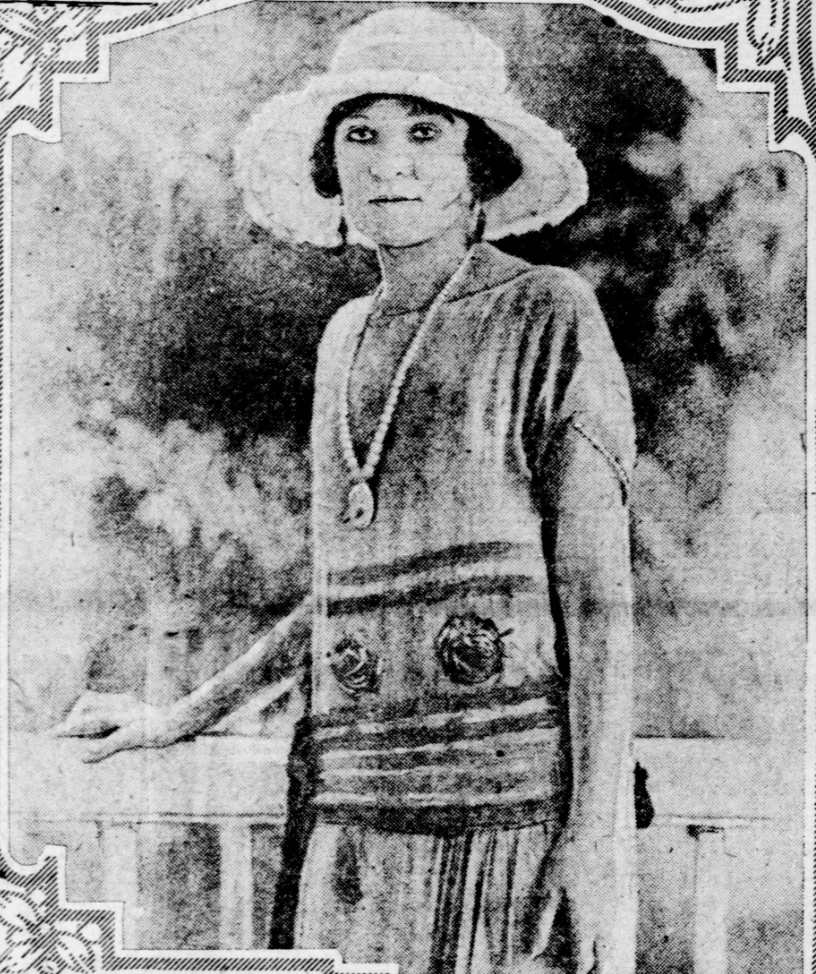
- This photo of Gertrude Lythgoe appears in the St. Louis Post-Dispatch in 1925.
- Born: March 1, 1888; Bowling Green, Ohio, USA
- Died: June 24, 1974 (aged 86); California, USA
- Known for: Involvement in the rum trade
- Notable work: The Bahama Queen: The Autobiography of Gertrude "Cleo" Lythgoe
- Parent(s): Charles Lythgoe and Catherine Lappin

Gertrude Lythgoe (March 1, 1888 - June 24, 1974) was one of the most prominent female rum-runners, or bootleggers, in the 1920s. She had various jobs before working for A. L. William Co in London where she began her involvement in the rum trade. Working out of the city of Nassau in the Bahamas she legally sold imported alcohol to bootleggers during the 1920s.

Little recording and research into the role of women selling alcohol during the 1920s has been conducted. However, most women worked domestically, while few were entrepreneurs in the bootlegging business, and no others on such a scale as Gertrude Lythgoe.

== Early life ==
Lythgoe was born on March 1, 1888, in Bowling Green, Ohio, to Charles Lythgoe, a glass manufacturer, and Catherine Lappin. She was the youngest of 10 children, and her mother died when she was very young. Her siblings and herself were essentially orphaned during this time, as their father was unable to care for them.

As a young adult Lythgoe worked as a stenographer in California and New York, which introduced her business men from many companies. This introduction led to Lythgoe accepting a job at the A. L. William Co in London, a position that was based in London, but had an office in New York.

== Rum running career ==
After the 18th Amendment was established in 1917, the manufacture, sale, and transportation of alcohol was banned in the United States. As a result, the alcohol trade became a lucrative business. Lythgoe proposed the idea of entering the rum trade to her company A. L. William Co, which granted her representative of their dealings in that area, giving her full control over their involvement in the rum trade. She moved to Nassau, the capital of the Bahamas and the rum trade, in 1922.

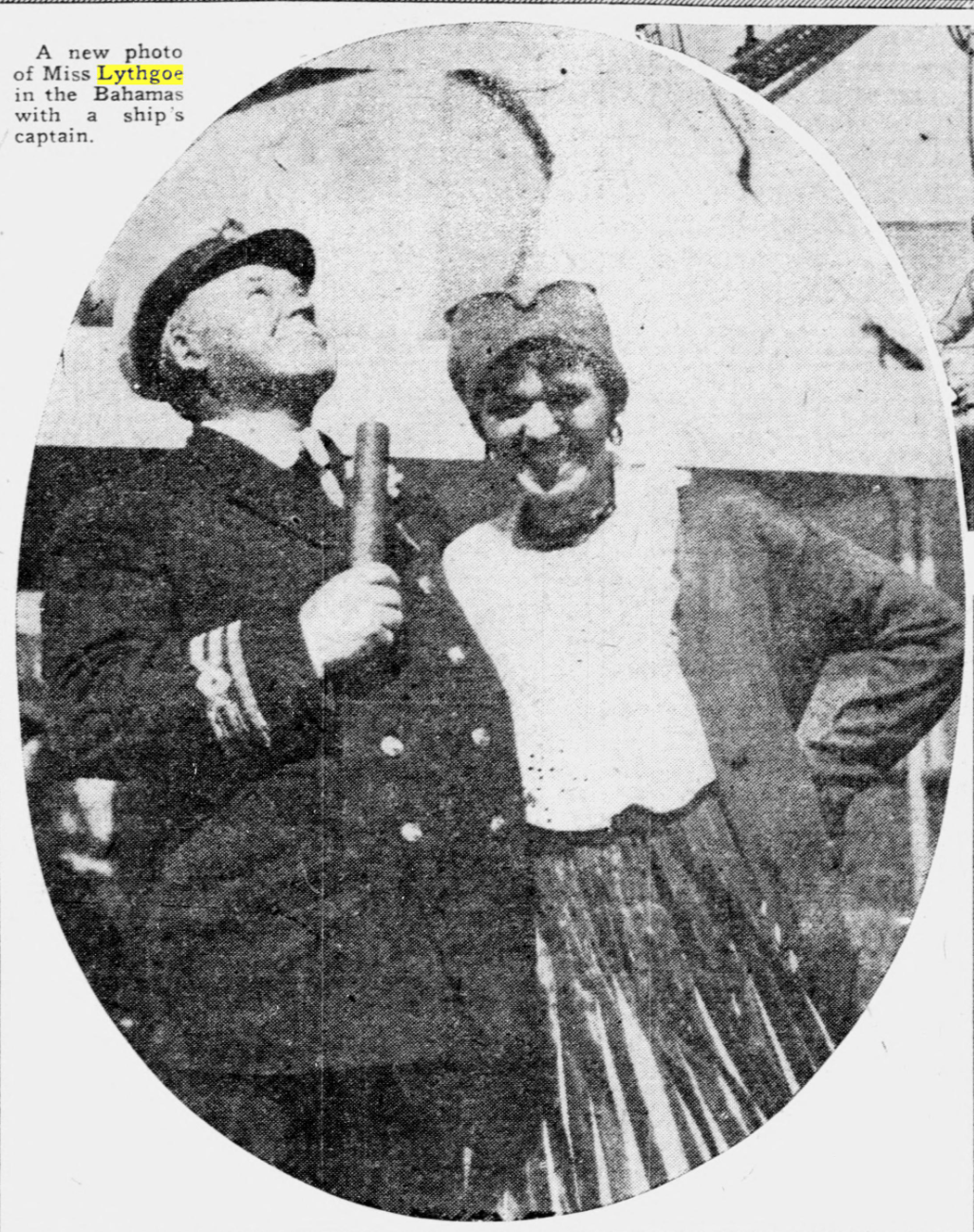
A photo of Gertrude Lythgoe with the captain of a ship.

Lythgoe prided herself on the quality of her product as she sold alcohol from the British Scotch Whiskey wholesaler, Haig and MacTavish. This pride in good quality also established her partnership with Captain Bill McCoy as she later sailed with him to the rum row, off the coast of the USA, to witness the selling of the goods.

Notably, Lythgoe claimed that all her dealings in the rum trade were legal. She sold the alcohol to people in the Bahamas, which was legal under their law, but had no contract to sell or move the alcohol to the U.S. This movement was all done by the bootleggers she primarily sold to, but had no part in after the sale.

Many people were skeptical of Lythgoe because of her gender, some thinking she was a U.S. spy, but she did not tolerate any sort of questioning of her position. On one occasion, the story goes that a man was found criticising Lythgoe and her quality of alcohol by Lythgoe herself. She later stated "I told him I’d put a bullet through him as sure as he sat there. He went away mighty quick.”

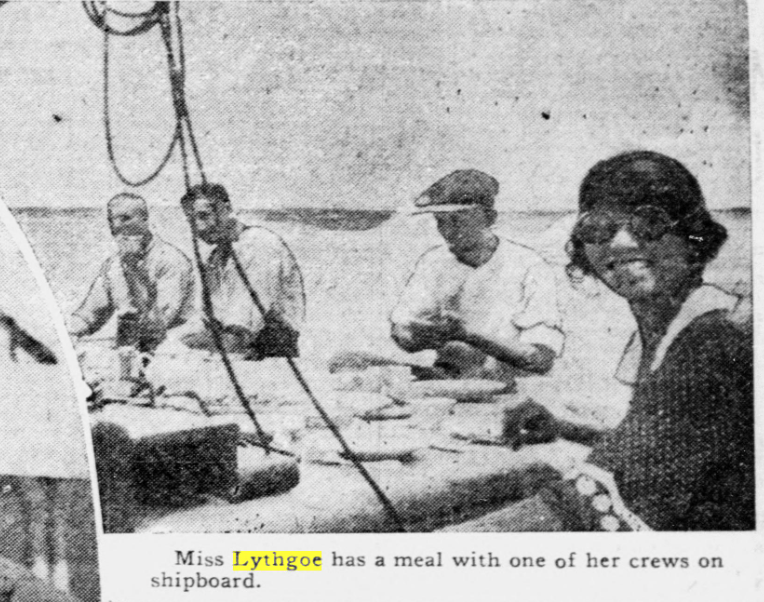
A photo of Gertrude Lythgoe with the crew of a ship.

Her time in the Bahamas also granted her the nickname Cleo due to her resemblance to Cleopatra. She was tall with dark hair and was commonly assumed to be an array of ethnicities. Her style contributed to this as she commonly wore dangling earrings, snake accessories, rings, bracelets, hats or turbans that were often purple, and a cigarette.

The year after prohibition was established, alcohol sales increased to four hundred times what they had been prior. As a result, Lythgoe became extremely wealthy and resided in the Lucerne Hotel with other bootlegger companions. Lythgoe became famous in the United States during the mid 1920s as a result of her skill in the bootlegging industry. She became known as "The Bahama Queen" and her nickname Cleo became a part of her bootlegging identity.

== Life after bootlegging ==
Lythgoe quit the rum business in 1926. Some report it to be because she feared she had been jinxed. This fear began in 1925 when her ship went down in the harbour of a British Island and as she was soon after arrested in Miami for illegally selling whiskey, but was cleared and witnesses against. Others report that Lythgoe left the trade as the business through Nassau decreased due to the cheaper cost of sailing straight from England to the Rum Row.

After she left Nassau and the rum business she moved to Detroit, Michigan. There she stayed for over 20 years as the owner of a rent-a-car business. In the 1950s she sold this business to move to California and start a new business selling car locks. After retiring, Lythgoe published her autobiography "The Bahama Queen: The Autobiography of Gertrude "Cleo" Lythgoe" in 1964. In 1966 she returned to live in Miami and work on her second book, although she died in 1974 before it was finished.

== Legacy ==
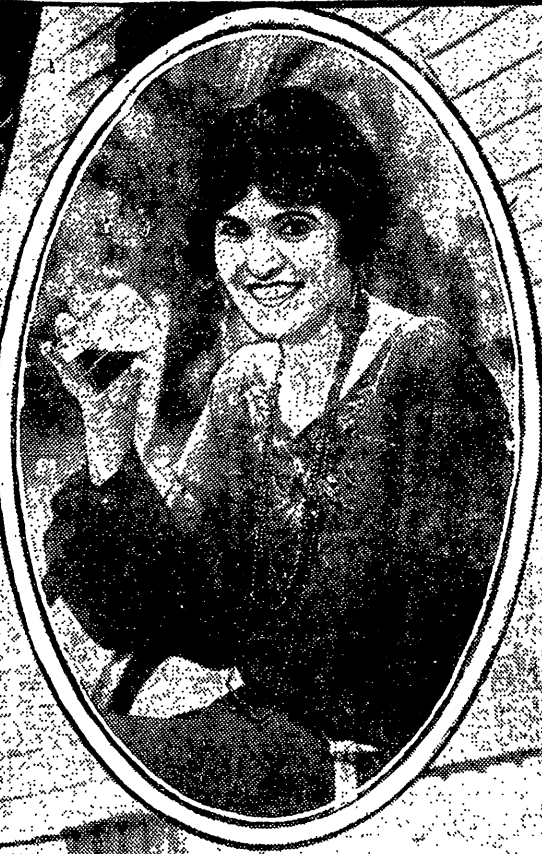
A photo of Gertrude Lythgoe in the Baltimore Sun newspaper.

Most women who were involved with alcohol during the time of prohibition worked domestically, making alcohol at home. Often, these women claimed to be making alcohol in order to provide for their children, especially widows. Others believed it was their duty to support their husbands who were bootleggers. Some women were entrepreneurs in the rum business, but this often meant selling alcohol illegally at small stores or stands. Gertrude Lythgoe was one of the most prominent women in the rum trade and this received attention in multiple newspapers as one of the only female figures in the business, which resulted in her being called "The Bahama Queen".

== Publications ==
Gertrude Lythgoe wrote the autobiography "The Bahama Queen: The Autobiography of Gertrude "Cleo" Lythgoe" which details stories from her life up to 1926 when she left Nassau. It was published in 1964 by the Exposition press Inc. She reportedly began work on a second book, her life after leaving Nassau, but died before it was completed.
