= Egg War =

1863 commercial dispute in California, US

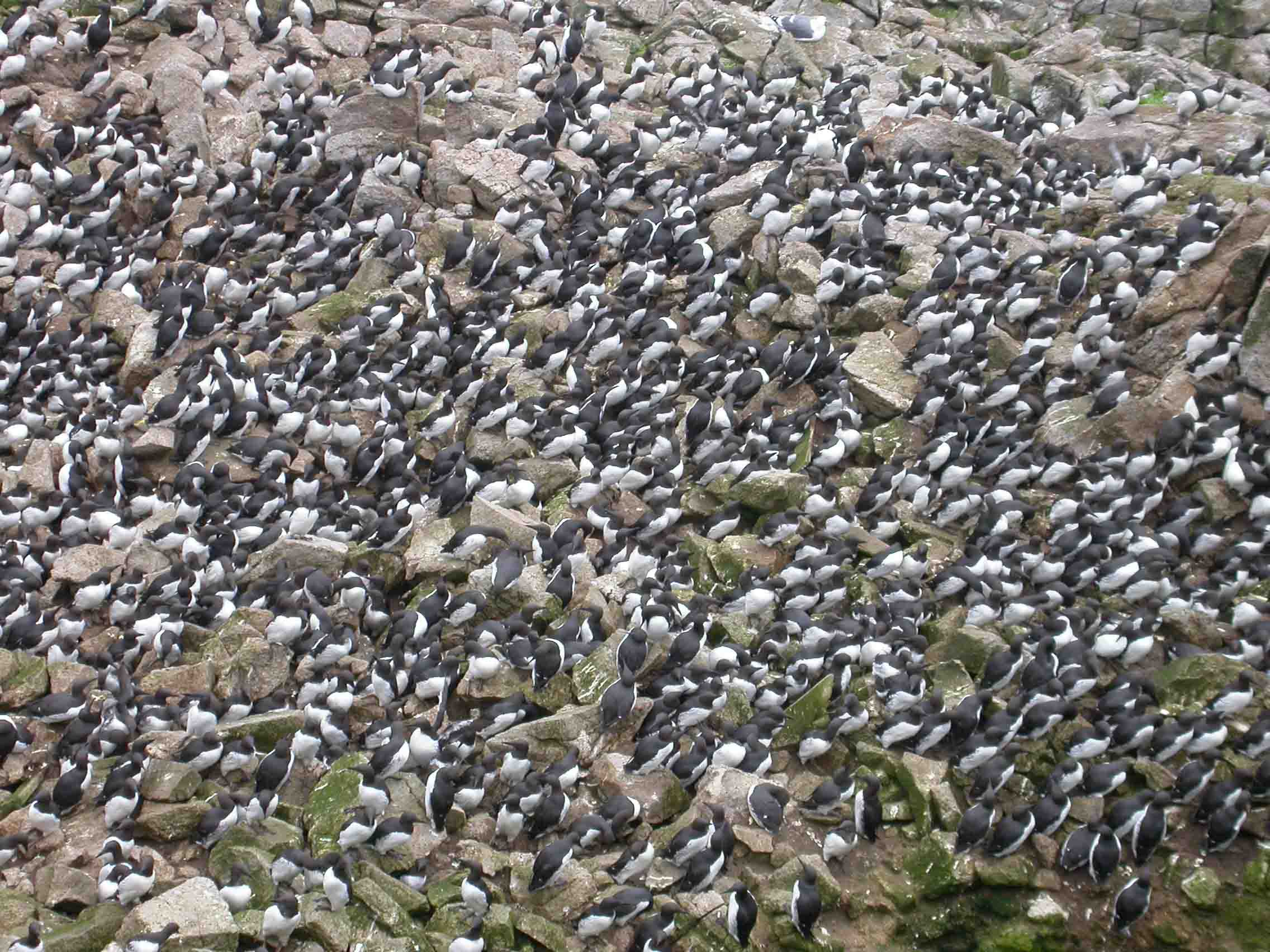
Common murres, Farallon Islands

The Egg War was an 1863 conflict between rival egging companies on the Farallon Islands, 25 miles off San Francisco. It was the culmination of several years of tension between the Pacific Egg Company (also known as the Farallon Egg Company), which claimed the right to collect the eggs on the islands, and rival firms. The resulting violence claimed two lives, but left the Egg Company in sole control of the islands' eggs. Its victory was short-lived; the company sold the rights to use the islands in the late-1870s and the federal government removed all egging companies from the islands in 1881.

== Egging on the Farallones ==
The Farallon Islands are the site of the largest seabird colony in the United States outside of Alaska and Hawaii, as well as an important sea lion rookery. This abundance of fresh meat and eggs attracted ships to replenish supplies and Russian sealers, who were the first to collect the abundant common murre eggs. When control of California passed from Mexico to the United States, it was not long before the economic potential of the islands became apparent. In 1849 a recent immigrant to San Francisco, "Dr. Robinson", sailed to the islands to collect the eggs, and despite losing half of his cargo, was able to make enough money to found a pharmacy and to form the Pacific Egg Company (the name changed over its history and is usually referred to as the Egg Company). The Egg Company strove to assert its claim to South East Farallon (SEFI) and the adjoining West End (or Maintop Island). It surveyed the islands, obtained a school warrant, and constructed buildings, paths, and landing facilities.

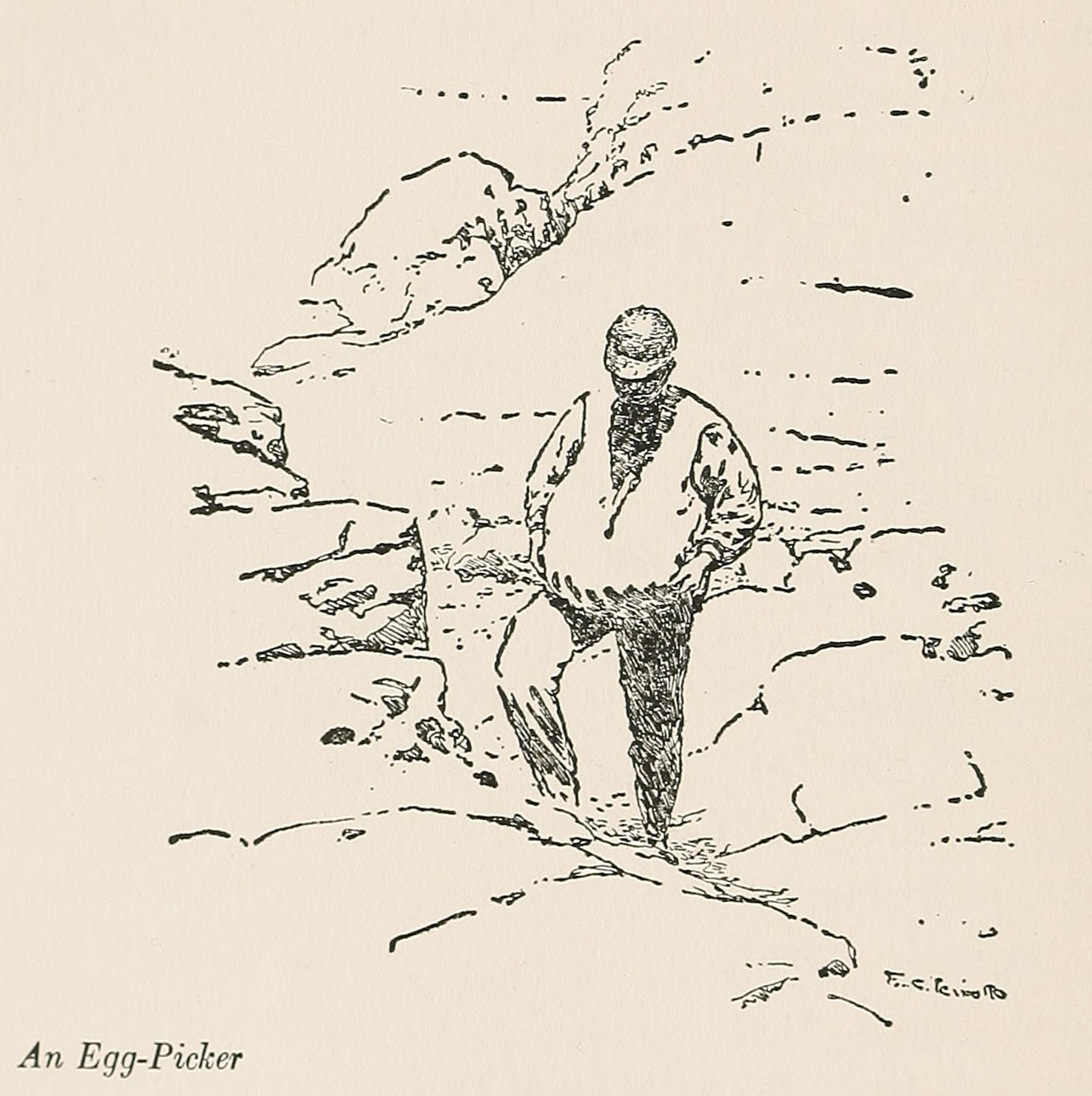
Egg picker, Farallon Islands

Egg collection was a seasonal occupation, from mid-May until July. The eggs of murres were preferred over those of other species, their eggs being the largest and most common ones available. Western gull eggs were also occasionally taken, having a comparable flavor, but they were smaller than murre eggs and more fragile (an important factor given the choppy seas between the Farallon Islands and San Francisco). Individual eggers collected from certain areas. Prior to collecting the workers would progress through a colony destroying every egg they could find, thus, returning to the site on subsequent days, they could be certain the eggs they collected were fresh. Eggers had to work quickly as the murres would flush and immediately the gulls would move in to snatch the unguarded eggs.

== The Egg War ==
The Egg Company attracted rivals, due to the amount of money to be made from the trade. Many fishermen collected eggs on the smaller and more treacherous North Farallones (which were not claimed by the Egg Company), but others attempted to egg on the main islands. The company's claims to exclusive ownership of the island were dealt a further blow by an executive order issued by President James Buchanan in 1859 which claimed the islands for the federal government in order to build a lighthouse (which had already been built in 1855). The then lighthouse superintendent of the area, Ira Rankin, did not attempt to push the Egg Company off the island and instead asserted their right to collect over that of the other companies. In 1863, when a company of men, led by a David Batchelder sailed to the islands, Rankin sent a boat of armed men to remove them from the island, seizing several weapons. Batchelder returned a few weeks later and, reinforced, tried again to remove the Egg Company. Rankin again sent forces to evict him and his men from the island.

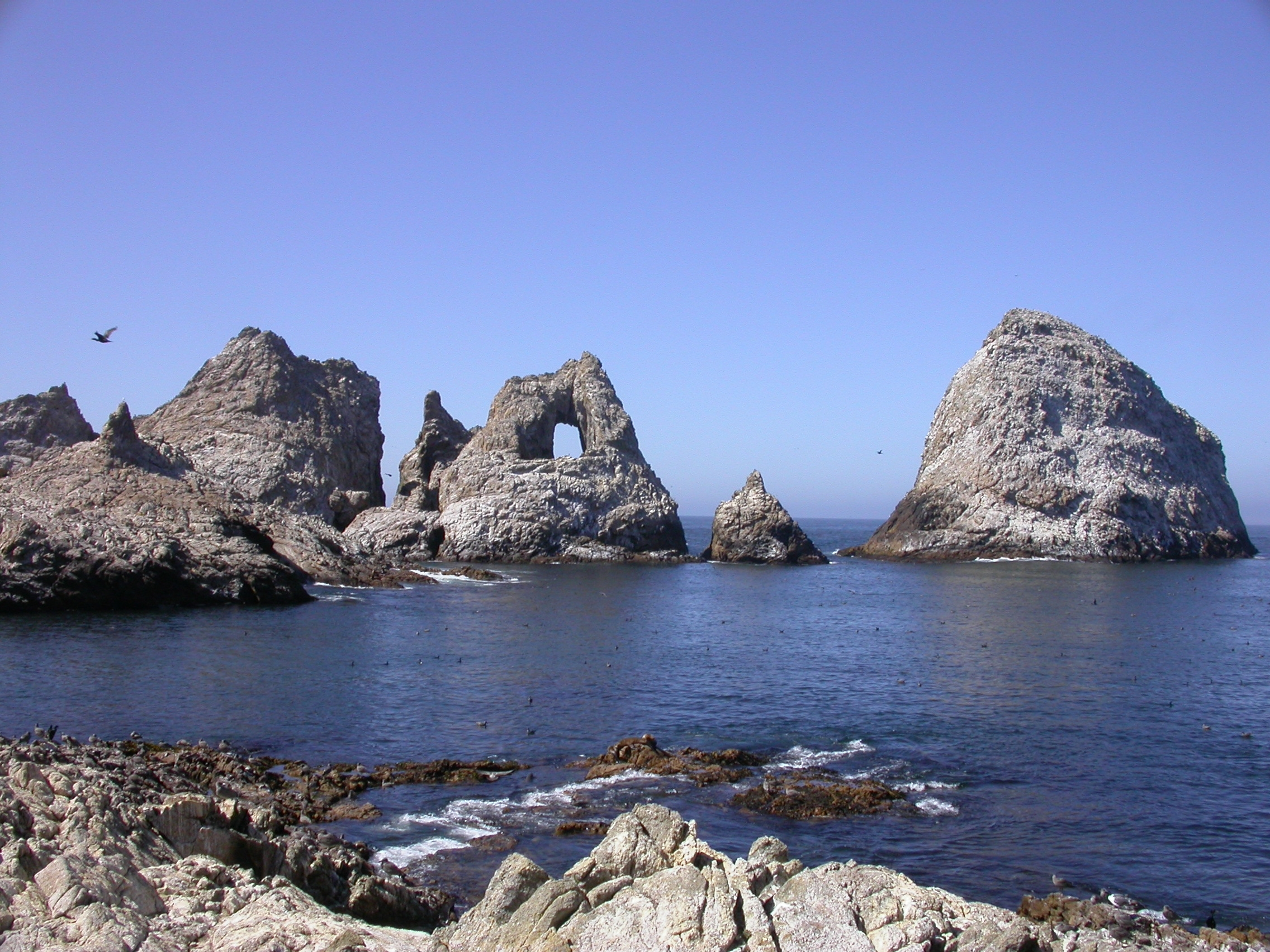
Fisherman's Bay, where Batchelder's men attempted to land.

Batchelder returned once more to the Farallones, on June 2, 1863. Rankin's forces again encountered them moored off North Landing, but Batchelder convinced them that he was intending to egg the North Farallones, not SEFI. Rankin's men left for San Francisco. With the government cutter gone, three rowboats with twenty-seven armed men attempted a landing on the morning of June 4. As Batchelder's men landed, they were fired upon by men from the Egg Company. Batchelder's men returned fire. The defenders had the advantage, having been able to pick their positions ahead of time, and after twenty minutes Batchelder's men retreated. One man was killed on each side, and four of Batchelder's men were wounded.

The aftermath of the conflict left the Egg Company in sole control of the islands. David Batchelder was initially convicted of manslaughter, but after an appeal ordered a retrial the charges were dropped. The presence of the eggers on the island was tolerated for another twenty years, but they were finally evicted in 1881. The commercial egging industry had a major impact on the Farallones' seabird populations. At the height of the trade, an estimated 500,000 eggs were collected each month, and approximately 14 million eggs were collected from the islands between 1850 and 1896.
