= Amy Appelhans Gubser =

American swimmer

Amy Appelhans Gubser (also referred as Amy Gubser) is an American swimmer from the state of California.

== Swimming career ==
Gubser co-founded Surf Camp Pacifica with her husband Greg Gubser, where she worked as an instructor. She started swimming at the age of ten, he at the age of five. Both have worked as professional lifeguards. She has completed over a dozen marathon swims in two years.

In 2016, she joined a relay team of six people in a swim from the Golden Gate Bridge to the Farallon Islands, and then back to the Golden Gate Bridge. The route was 59.4-mile-long and took 34 hours and 54 minutes to complete. In September 2018, she became the fourth person to complete a 25-mile swim across the Monterey Bay, starting from the Santa Cruz Harbor and finishing at the San Carlos Beach. The route took 17 hours and 49 minutes.

At the age of fifty-five, she swam through a 29.7-mile-long shark-infested route from the Golden Gate Bridge to the Farallon Islands. The swim, which took place in 2024, took 17 hours to complete. She was the first person to complete this route.

== Personal life ==
Gubser has lived in Pacifica for seventeen years. She has two children, as well as grandchildren. She works as a pediatric nurse.
