= Rum row =

Ships smuggling liquor to the US, 1920–1933

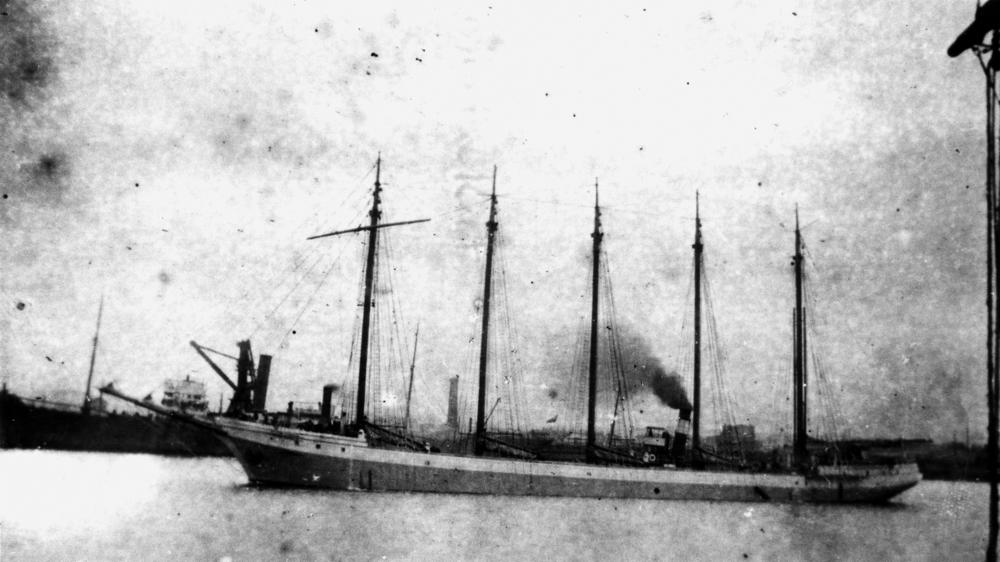
Pacific coast offshore rum-runner Malahat

A rum row was a Prohibition-era term (1920–1933) referring to a line of ships loaded with liquor anchored beyond the maritime limit of the United States. These ships evaded the Eighteenth Amendment’s prohibition on the sale and consumption of alcoholic beverages. Although rum prevailed along Caribbean shores, other beverages were popular elsewhere.

== Rum-running ==
The maritime limit was three miles prior to April 21, 1924, and 12 miles thereafter. These lines became established near major U.S. ports so that rum runners could load cargoes of alcoholic beverages from these freight ships and sneak them into port. The cargoes were sourced from the Caribbean and Canada, which repealed their respective prohibition policies at the moment the United States started its own. The bulk of the ships flew the British flag but were actually registered in Canada and owned by Canadians who had ties with American syndicates.

The cities with rum rows were often in Florida at first and the product was rum from the Caribbean. As the importation of whiskey from Canada increased, rum rows became established in locations along all the coastlines of the U.S. Notable rum-row locations included the New Jersey coast (by far the largest), San Francisco, Virginia, Galveston, and New Orleans. Twenty U.S. Navy destroyers were turned over to the Coast Guard to fight rum runners.

The lucrative but dangerous business was often punctuated by murder, hijackings and other violent crimes. There are accounts of a Greek merchant turned rum runner who was tied to an anchor and thrown overboard by his crew who wanted the rum for themselves. A woman named Gertrude Lythgoe also became known in the New York rum row. She was employed by the British firm Haig and MacTavish Scotch Whisky and notoriously sold her liquor at the rum row after she was expelled by male competitors from Nassau.

== See also ==
- American Whiskey Trail
- Free State of Galveston
- Malahat (schooner)
- Rocky Springs Segment of the Whoop-Up Trail
