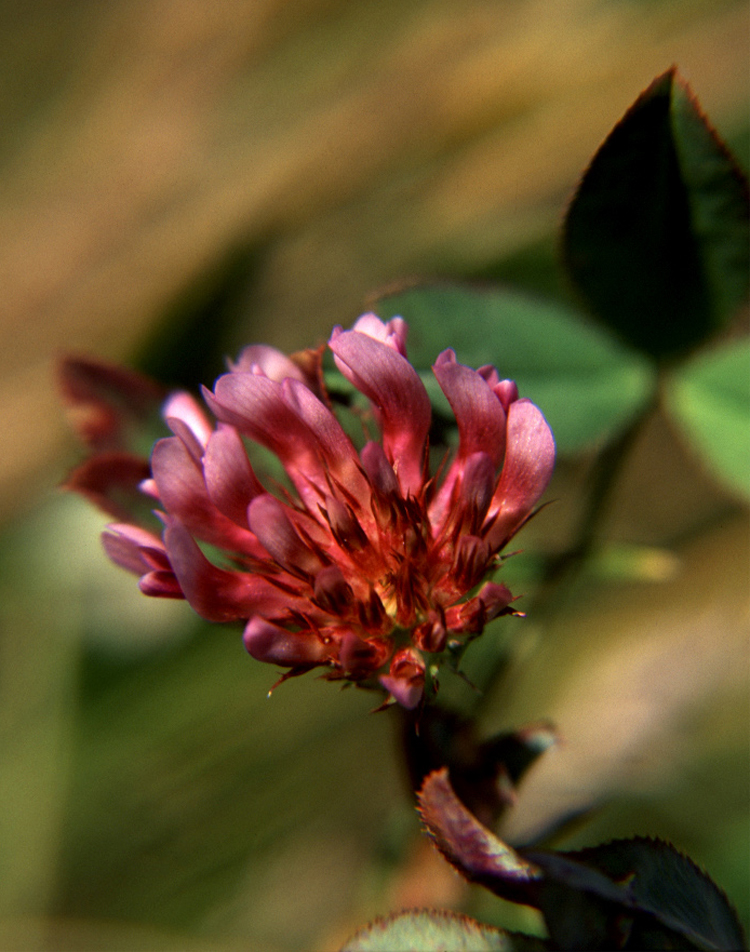
- Trifolium variegatum at Humboldt Bay National Wildlife Refuge Complex, California, USA

Scientific classification
- Kingdom: Plantae
- Clade: Tracheophytes
- Clade: Angiosperms
- Clade: Eudicots
- Clade: Rosids
- Order: Fabales
- Family: Fabaceae
- Subfamily: Faboideae
- Genus: Trifolium
- Species: T. variegatum

Binomial name
- Trifolium variegatum Nutt.

Synonyms
- Trifolium appendiculatum Trifolium geminiflorum Trifolium melananthum Trifolium polyodon Trifolium trilobatum

= Trifolium variegatum =

Species of legume

Trifolium variegatum is a species of clover known by the common name whitetip clover. It is native to western North America from southern Alaska and British Columbia to Baja California, where it occurs in many types of habitat.

== Description ==
Trifolium variegatum is a variable plant, taking many forms. It is an annual or possibly sometimes perennial herb growing prostrate to upright in form, thin to fleshy and usually hairless in texture. The leaves are made up of usually three variously shaped leaflets with serrated edges.

The inflorescence is a headlike cluster containing a single flower or many flowers in a cluster over 2 centimeters wide. At its base is a fused involucre of bracts. Each flower has a calyx of sepals narrowing to bristle-like tips. The flower corolla is generally purplish in color and usually has a white tip. It grows in habitats with dry, sandy soil to moist meadows.
