= Malahat (schooner) =

Schooner from Vancouver, Canada, known for rum-running during Prohibition

Coordinates: 49.859297°N 124.547962°W

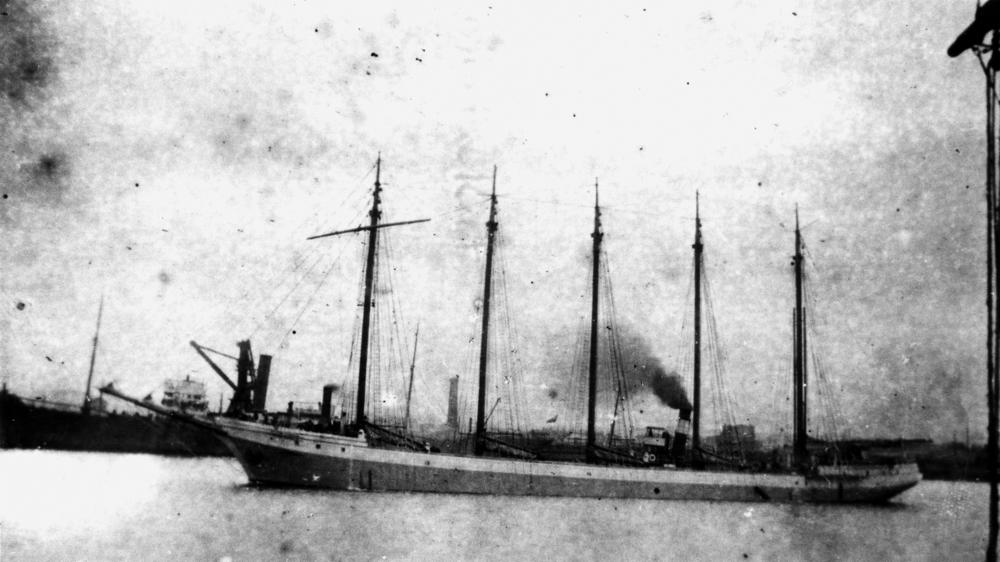
- Malahat in port

History

Canada
- Name: Malahat
- Owner: Archibald McGillis, Vancouver, 1923; General Navigation Co., Vancouver, 1929; Gordon Gibson, Sr., 1934; Canada West Coast Navigation Company
- Builder: Cameron Genoa Mills Shipbuilders Ltd., Victoria, BC
- Cost: $750,000 Canadian
- Completed: August 1917
- Fate: Wrecked 23 March 1944

General characteristics
- Class & type: Mabel Brown class
- Tonnage: 1,544 grt, 1199 net
- Length: 246 ft (75 m)
- Beam: 43 ft 9 in (13.34 m)
- Depth: 21 ft (6.4 m)
- Propulsion: Twin Bolinder semi-diesels, 320 bhp; coal-fired steam boiler
- Sail plan: Five-masted schooner
- Complement: Minimum of 15 crew members
- Notes: Hull of Douglas fir. Top speed (est.) 5 knots. Infamous rum-runner that eluded US Coast Guard for 13 yrs.

Malahat, a large 5-masted lumber schooner from Vancouver, BC, was known as "the Queen of Rum Row" in her day. She became famous (or infamous) for rum-running on the US Pacific Coast between 1920 and 1933. The Vancouver Maritime Museum says that Malahat delivered "more contraband liquor than any other ship."

== Construction ==
Malahat was built in 1917 in Victoria, British Columbia, by Cameron Genoa Mills Shipbuilders. Her owner was the Canadian Steamships Company of Montreal. As a result of the "ship emergency" during World War I, Malahat was pressed into service even before her engines were installed. She "performed reasonably well under sail" during her first voyage.

Malahat was comfortably equipped for long voyages as of 1934, with "a coal-burning fireplace in the owner's quarters and two full-size bathtubs."

Active until 1944, the Mabel Brown class Malahat was the longest-lived of all the 12 five-masted auxiliary schooners built in Victoria and North Vancouver in 1917–1918.

== Lumber schooner ==
Malahat began her career as a working lumber schooner, sailing between Canada and Australia, transporting a cargo of 1,300,000 board feet in 1917.

Malahat became a lumber schooner once again after Prohibition ended. In 1934, Gordon Gibson, Sr. and his brother were so excited to discover Malahat up for sale for only $2,500 that they bought her on the spot. She was used as a self-propelled log barge, carrying Sitka spruce from the Queen Charlotte Islands to the booming ground at the Powell River in Teakerne Arm in Desolation Sound. Because the Malahat required a crew of fifteen, one of the challenges for a local lumbering operation was assembling a crew with experience in seamanship as well as logging.

Her engines were removed during World War II, "when engines were in short supply."

== Career as a rum-runner ==
The Malahat was owned by the Riefel family of Vancouver, a family involved in the local brewing industry. The Malahat sailed out to "Rum Row", located somewhere between the Pacific Coast and Hawaii (possibly the Farallon Islands), where she served as a floating warehouse while smaller, faster vessels picked up the contraband liquor and ran it ashore. The bottles were offloaded in cases or in burlap bags holding 12 bottles apiece. Some of the fast "mosquito boats" were equipped with Liberty engines, and could reach speeds of 25 knots. Estimates of the top speed of these smaller vessels range as high as 35–40 knots. The Malahat was not very fast; one source claims that she could do "about five knots!"

Jim Stone, son of Malahat's Captain Stuart Stone, interviewed family and acquaintances to learn more about his father's activities during the Prohibition Era (1920–1933). In his book, My Dad, The Rum Runner, Stone determined that the Malahat could carry up to 100,000 bottles of illegal liquor, of which 40,000 were stowed on deck. Another source cites a figure of "84,000 cases in the hold plus approximately 16,000 on deck when the Ryuo II loaded from her, summer 1933." One cargo, consisting of "32,000 cases of whiskey and 15 barrels of beer," required "almost nine months to discharge" due to the foggy weather in 1925 along the California coast. Gibbs estimates that the ship delivered 120,000 cases annually, "even when the trade was slow," making one or two trips per year.

Surprisingly, Malahat managed to smuggle rum for 13 years despite the efforts of the U.S. Coast Guard. Apparently this was possible in part because Captain Stone's sister-in-law, who lived near Jericho Beach, Vancouver, received information from "sympathetic coastal vessels" and transmitted coded radio messages to the ship regarding the Coast Guard's whereabouts. Evasive tactics included dropping burlap bags of sand over the side as a decoy, and marking the site as a cache of liquor, in order to distract the Coast Guard's attention while the ship sailed off to another location.

One practical commentary on the Malahat's career says:

JG: The Malahat looks like it would have cost a lot of money to keep in operation as a rum-runner.

TH: Most of its rum-running was pretty sedate in that it steamed up from San Francisco and threw out the anchor and sat there off the international limits.

Sure it was an expensive boat to maintain but don't forget: A) it wasn't using up a lot of fuel, and B) rum-running was hugely profitable. Just incredible amounts of money.

Although it's a small chapter in B.C. history it is important in that it kept a lot of seamen and shipyards busy when the economy was truly bust.

Two other captains served aboard Malahat during the rum-running era in addition to Capt. Stuart Stone: Archie McGillis and Captain John D. Vosper. The Malahat's illegal liquor could be found as far south as San Diego, California, allegedly transported from Malahat's anchorage 140 miles south, at Punta Colonet, Baja California.

== Shipwreck ==
She foundered in Barkley Sound in 1944, and was towed to Powell River, British Columbia, where her wreck remains.

The Malahat was the subject of the 2002 The Sea Hunters: True Adventures With Famous Shipwrecks documentary, The Malahat: Queen of the Rum Runners, narrated by Clive Cussler.

== Legacy ==
The career of the Malahat has been cited as recently as October 2011, on the floor of the House of Commons of Canada, by MP Randall Garrison, as an example of potential negative consequences that could result from passing a new law to prohibit transport of wine between provinces for personal use.

Malahat Spirits Co., a San Diego, CA distillery specializing in rum, is named after the Malahat.
