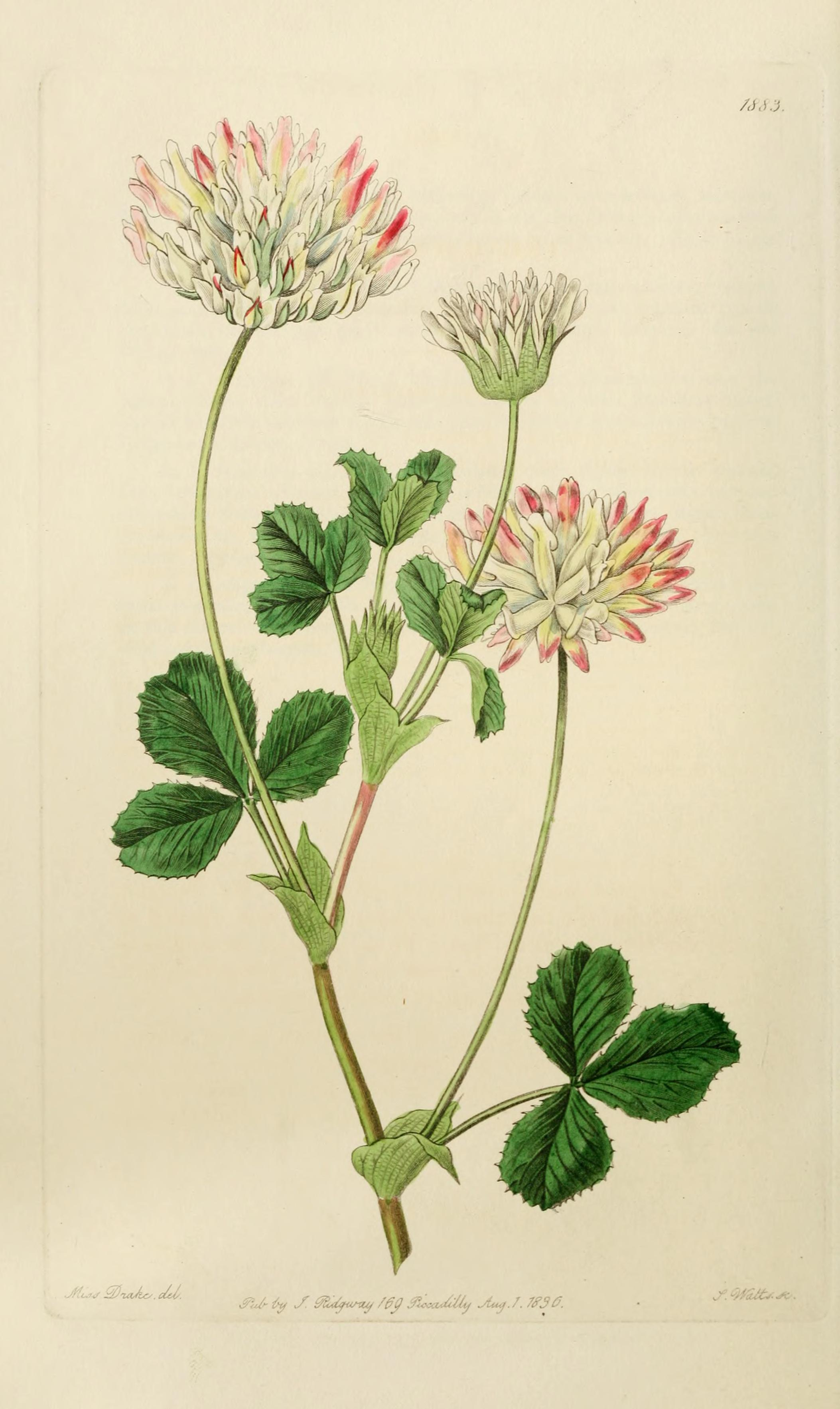

Scientific classification
- Kingdom: Plantae
- Clade: Embryophytes
- Clade: Tracheophytes
- Clade: Spermatophytes
- Clade: Angiosperms
- Clade: Eudicots
- Clade: Rosids
- Order: Fabales
- Family: Fabaceae
- Subfamily: Faboideae
- Genus: Trifolium
- Species: T. fucatum

Binomial name
- Trifolium fucatum Lindl.

= Trifolium fucatum =

Species of flowering plant

Trifolium fucatum is a species of clover known by the common names bull clover and sour clover. The species is native to the western United States and is edible with proper preparation.

== Description ==
Trifolium fucatum is an annual herb growing decumbent to erect in form. The stem is often thick-walled and hollow. The leaf blades are made up of oval or rounded leaflets with smooth or toothed edges, and the leaves have large stipules.

The inflorescence is a head of flowers with a base of wide bracts. Each flower corolla is 1 to 2 centimeters (1/2 to 3/4 in) long and white or yellowish with purple tips. The flower becomes inflated as the fruit develops.

== Distribution and habitat ==
It is native to the western United States (California and Oregon), where it grows in many types of habitat, becoming common to abundant in some areas.

== Planting ==
When planting, bull clover seeds should be scattered in places that are free of weedy grasses. It should not be planted along with non-native clover species because they will be competition for native clovers.

The clover is susceptible to attacks from non-native slugs and snails, so measures may need to be taken to repel them.

== Uses ==
The leaves, flowers, young seedpods, and seeds are edible. Bull clover can be eaten before and during flowering. It can be eaten raw, baked, or steamed. Care should be taken to remove a few leaves from each plant rather than destroying an entire plant when harvesting leaves for consumption. Bull clover has a better taste when grown in moist soils. Indigenous peoples were recorded as consuming the clovers from February to April, prior to the plants blooming.

It is recommended that the plant be dipped or boiled in salt water prior to consumption in order to prevent digestive upset. A small amount should be eaten in order to see how the body responds. In most cases, consuming moderate amounts of bull clover occurs without issue.
