= Special effects of Batman Returns =

The special effects of the 1992 American superhero film Batman Returns were a blend of practical and digital techniques, ranging from matte paintings and miniatures to puppetry, pyrotechnics, and early computer-generated imagery (CGI). Overseen by visual effects supervisor Michael Fink, the film's effects workload grew from an initial 90 shots to 115 by the end of a hectic post-production period, with multiple visual effects houses and subcontractors contributing to its completion. New shots were devised just weeks before release, including a miniature-based title sequence and a re-worked final shot revealing Catwoman's fate.

== Overview ==
Batman production designer Anton Furst was replaced by Bo Welch, who understood Burton's visual intentions after previous collaborations on Beetlejuice (1988) and Edward Scissorhands (1990). Furst, already occupied on another project, committed suicide in November 1991. Warner Bros. maintained a high level of security for Batman Returns, requiring the art department to keep their window blinds closed. Cast and crew had to wear ID badges with the film's working title, Dictel, a word coined by Welch and Burton meaning "dictatorial"; they were unhappy with the studio's "ridiculous gestapo" measures. Welch designed the Batboat vehicle, a programmable batarang, and the Penguin's weaponized umbrellas. He added features to the Batmobile, such as detaching much of its exterior to fit through tighter spaces; this version was called the "Batmissile".

The production of Batman Returns was marked by a frenetic post-production period, with new visual effects shots being conceived just weeks before the film's June 19, 1992, release date in the United States and Canada. Initially planned to feature approximately ninety effects shots, the number was quickly reduced to about seventy-eight within the first month of filming due to budgetary and scheduling constraints. However, following the end of principal photography in late February, the visual effects workload expanded considerably, ultimately encompassing around 115 shots by the time of completion.

Overseen by visual effects supervisor Michael Fink, the film's ambitious scope demanded a broad toolkit—including matte paintings, miniatures, CGI, makeup effects, puppets, and pyrotechnics. Some of the late additions included a newly devised miniature effect for the title sequence and a final shot crafted to clarify Catwoman's fate following her apparent death. Digital wire removals were also employed to conceal the work of physical effects supervisor Chuck Gaspar. Due to the scale and complexity of the project, the effects work was divided among six major effects houses (including Stan Winston Studio, Boss Film Studios, and Matte World Digital), their subcontractors, and the production offices at Dictel.

=== Crew ===
The visual effects crew for Batman Returns included:

==== Supervising Visual Effects ====
- Dennis Skotak – Supervising Visual Effects Photographer

==== Visual Effects Supervisors ====
- Michael L. Fink – Visual Effects Supervisor
- Don Baker – The Chandler Group Supervisor
- Craig Barron – Matte World Supervisor
- John Bruno – Boss Film Studios Supervisor
- John Scheele – The Chandler Group Supervisor
- Robert Skotak – 4-Ward Productions Supervisor
- Mark Stetson – Stetson Visual Services Supervisor
- Jim Rygiel – Digital Effects Supervisor

==== Visual Effects Coordinators and Producers ====
- Erik Henry – Visual Effects Coordinator
- Jennifer Bell – 4-Ward Line Producer
- Holly Borradaile – 4-Ward Associate Producer
- Robin D'Arcy – 4-Ward Line Producer
- Krystyna Demkowicz – Matte World Executive in Charge of Production
- Jenny Fulle – 4-Ward Line Producer
- Christine Sellin – Boss Film Studios Line Producer
- Ellen Somers – Boss Film Studios Production Supervisor
- Martin Matzinger – Matte World Production Coordinator

==== Visual Effects Artists / Specialists ====
- Steve Burg – Conceptual Artist
- Brent Boates – Boss Film Studios Co-supervisor and Art Director
- Michael Pangrazio – Matte World Effects Supervisor
- Brian Flora – Matte Artist
- Bill Mather – Matte Artist
- Michele Moen – Matte Department Supervisor
- Christopher Leith Evans – Matte Artist
- Alan Harding – Matte Photography
- Annick Therrien – Rotoscope Supervisor
- Nina Salerno – Rotoscope Artist
- Colin Olson – Digital Effects Animator
- Andy White – Digital Effects Animator
- Andrea Losch – Digital Effects Animator
- Rhonda C. Gunner – Digital Bats/Batmobile Shields (Video Image)
- Richard E. Hollander – Digital Bats/Batmobile Shields (Video Image)
- Gregory L. McMurry – Digital Bats/Batmobile Shields (Video Image)
- John C. Wash – Digital Bats/Batmobile Shields (Video Image)

==== Miniatures and Model Work ====
- Scott Alexander – Modelmaker
- Stephen Brien – Model/Miniature Set Supervisor
- Patrick Denver – Miniature Set Fabrication/Operation
- Ian Hunter – Stetson Visual Services Chief Modelmaker
- David Jones – Boss Film Studios Model Shop Supervisor
- Mike Joyce – Lead Modelmaker
- John Merritt – Modelmaker
- Doug Moore – Miniature Set Fabrication/Operation
- Gerard "Pete" Bryson – Modelmaker
- Gary Rhodaback – Modelmaker
- Ricc Ruskuski – Miniature Set Fabrication/Operation
- Monty Shook – Modelmaker
- Joel Steiner – Miniature Set Fabrication/Operation
- Jim Towler – Model/Miniature Set Supervisor
- Garry Waller – Miniatures Photography
- Ron Gress – Lead Model Painter

==== Camera & Motion Control ====
- James Belkin – Visual Effects Photography
- Tim Angulo – Visual Effects Photography (Old Zoo)
- George Dodge – Visual Effects Photography
- Neil Krepela – Plate Photography
- Joel Hladecek – Motion Control Cameraman
- Drummond Stone – Camera Assistant
- Bret Harding – Assistant Cameraman
- Josh Cushner – Motion Control Operator (The Chandler Group)

==== Special & Mechanical Effects ====
- Chuck Gaspar – Special Effects Supervisor
- Michael Reedy – Mechanical Effects Supervisor
- Mike Edmonson – Special Effects Foreman
- Bill Klinger – Special Effects Foreman (Boss Film Studios)
- Jan Aaris – Special Effects
- Karl Nygren – Special Effects
- Elmer Hui – Special Effects
- Scott Forbes – Special Effects
- Bruce Robles – Special Effects
- Mike Weaver – Special Effects
- Andy Evans – Special Effects
- Ken Clark – Special Effects
- Dan Gaspar – Special Effects
- Joe Viskocil – Stetson Visual Services Pyrotechnic Supervisor

==== Costume & Technical Effects ====
- Bob Ringwood – Costume Design
- Mary E. Vogt – Costume Design
- Vin Burnham – Visual/Technical Costume Effects Supervisor
- Paul Barrett-Brown – Costume Effects
- Michael Bastings – Costume Effects
- Dorothy Bulac – Costume Effects
- Alli Eynon – Costume Effects
- Paul James – Costume Effects
- Mary Mason – Costume Effects
- Day Murch – Costume Effects
- Ray Tricker – Costume Effects

==== Vehicles & Props ====
- Jay Ohrberg – Batboat, Batmissile, Duck Car
- Star Cars – Batboat, Batmissile, Duck Car

== Costume design ==
=== Batman ===
Batman's Batsuit was redesigned to create the illusion of mechanical parts built into the torso, intending Batman to resemble Darth Vader. Forty-eight foam-rubber Batsuits were made for Batman Returns. They had a mechanical system of bolts and spikes beneath the breast plate to secure the cowl and cape because "otherwise, if [Keaton] turned around quickly the cape would stay where it was", due to its weight. Costumer Paul Barrett-Brown said that the suit had a "generous codpiece" for comfort, and initially included a zippered fly to allow Keaton to use the bathroom; the actor declined, however, because it could be seen by the camera from some angles. As with the Batman costume, Keaton could not turn his head; he compensated by making bolder, more powerful movements with his lower body.

=== Catwoman ===
The Catwoman outfit was made from latex because it was designed to be "black and sexy and tight and shiny". The material was chosen because of its association with "erotic and sexual" situations, reflecting the character's transition from a repressed secretary to an extroverted, erotic female. Padding was added because Pfeiffer was less physically endowed than Bening; this worked to Pfeiffer's advantage, however, since Barrett-Brown said that if it was too tight it "would reveal the genital area so thoroughly that you'd get an X certificate." Ringwood and Vogt thought that if the latex material tore it would not be difficult to repair; forty to seventy backup Catwoman suits were made by Western Costume, the Warner Bros. costume department, and Los Angeles-based clothing manufacturer Syren at a cost of $1,000 each. Other versions, made for Pfeiffer from a cast of her body, were so tight that she had to be covered in baby powder to wear them. Barrett-Brown said that because of the material, it was possible to get into the suit when dry; they could not re-use them, however, because of sweat and body oils exuded by the person wearing them. Vin Burnham constructed Catwoman's headpiece and mask.

Burton was influenced to add stitching by calico cats, but the stitching came apart. Ringwood and Vogt struggled with adding stitching to latex. They tried to sculpt stitching and glue it on, but did not like the look and went over the suit with liquid silicon while it was worn (which added a shine to everything). Pfeiffer said that the suit was like a second skin, but when worn for long periods it was uncomfortable; there was no way to use the restroom and it would stick to her skin, occasionally causing a rash. She found the mask similarly confining, describing it as choking her or "smashing my face", and she found that the claws would catch on nearby objects.

=== Penguin ===
To transform into the Penguin, Danny DeVito wore a combination of prosthetics and makeup that covered much of his face.

Burton's interpretation of the Penguin in Batman Returns diverged from the character's original comic book portrayal. The Penguin, created by Bob Kane and Bill Finger in 1941, was initially envisioned as a refined, dandy-like villain, complete with tuxedo, monocle, and a penchant for trick umbrellas and bird-themed crimes. Their inspiration for the character stemmed from the image of a cartoon penguin used in Kool cigarette advertisements, rather than any deep psychological exploration. Burton reimagined the Penguin as a grotesque, physically deformed outcast, featuring a hunched posture, webbed hands, and avian facial features. Burton explained that he had never connected with the comic book version of the character, finding it lacking in psychological depth compared to other villains such as the Joker or Catwoman. He emphasized the need to ground even fantastical characters in some form of psychological reality.

To bring this vision to life, Burton enlisted Stan Winston Studio, which had previously collaborated with him on Edward Scissorhands. The studio's task was to create a fully realized character whose appearance would reflect the Penguin's disturbed psyche. Makeup artist Ve Neill initially crafted a realistic design, but the final look was adjusted to better align with Burton's exaggerated, stylized aesthetic. According to Winston, the first test included stark, cartoonish features such as dark-rimmed eyes and pale skin, which ultimately better suited the tone of the film.

The character's facial design was developed by makeup artists Shane Mahan and John Rosengrant, with contributions from illustrator Mark "Crash" McCreery. Using Burton's concept sketches, McCreery produced a series of designs that exaggerated traditional Penguin traits—jowls, a beak-like nose, and a monocle—superimposed over portrait renderings of actor Danny DeVito. The team used lifecasts of DeVito to experiment with various prosthetic pieces, including multiple nose shapes, which were tested against the evolving costume design. Stan Winston Studio aimed to create an "over-the-top Burtonesque" look that maintained DeVito's recognizability. Using a lifecast of the actor's face, Legacy Effects (then part of Winston Studio) built a variety of prosthetic nose appliances based on the concept art. Winston was dissatisfied with early pointed-nose designs, which he felt resembled a witch, and returned to clay sculpting himself. He drew inspiration from his previous work on The Wiz (1978), where he had created large-beaked bird creatures using appliances that incorporated the forehead and brow. The final makeup included a T-shaped appliance which went over DeVito's nose, lip, and brow as well as crooked teeth, whitened skin, and dark circles under his eyes. Ve Neill applied the makeup.

Another element of the character's look was his dental prosthetics. DeVito wore various sets of artificial teeth, all designed to appear both threatening and decayed, emphasizing the character's life spent underground and outside of conventional society. The final dental design included upper and lower prosthetics that were long, uneven, and stained, enhancing the overall grotesque appearance. DeVito helped create the Penguin's black saliva with the makeup and effects teams, using a mild mouthwash and food coloring that he squirted into his mouth before filming. He later commented that the taste was acceptable.

Throughout the design process, the team aimed to enhance DeVito's features without entirely obscuring them. Mahan emphasized that the prosthetics needed to retain the actor's essence. After finalizing the facial pieces—nose, brow, and upper lip—they were combined with skin tone blending and cosmetic detailing to complete the transformation. Neill applied the makeup daily during production, ensuring consistency and integration with the actor's performance. The several pounds of facial prosthetics, body padding, and prosthetic hands initially took four-and-a-half hours to apply to DeVito, though the process was eventually reduced to around three hours by the end of filming. An air bladder was added to the costume to help reduce its weight.

The Penguin's final look, with its pale complexion and dark eye circles, reflected Burton's affinity for German Expressionist visuals, a recurring theme in his work, seen in films such as Beetlejuice and Edward Scissorhands.

The rest of the Penguin's costume, along with Batman's and Catwoman's suits, was designed by Ringwood and Vogt and constructed under the supervision of Vin Burnham. Once the full makeup and costume were in place, DeVito fully immersed himself in the role. According to Burton, the actor's performance was so convincing that crew members found him unsettling between takes. Burton remarked that DeVito's commitment to the role resulted in a complete transformation into a misanthropic, socially isolated character. Burton described DeVito as completely in-character in costume, and he "scared everybody". While re-dubbing some of his dialogue, DeVito struggled to get into character without the makeup and had it applied to improve his performance. Because of the secrecy surrounding his character's appearance before marketing, DeVito was not allowed to discuss it with others (including his family). A photo of DeVito in costume leaked to the press, and Warner Bros. employed a firm of private investigators in a failed attempt to track down the source.

== Opening scene at Cobblepot mansion ==
The prologue of Batman Returns, which depicts the birth of Oswald Cobblepot and his banishment by his parents, involved a combination of in-camera miniatures and matte painting effects. These were created by Matte World, a company founded by alumni of the Industrial Light & Magic (ILM) matte department. The decision to use in-camera effects was deliberate, as it eliminated concerns related to compositing and matte line clean-up. Matte World visual effects co-supervisor Craig Barron noted that this method provided a more seamless integration of visual elements.

The Cobblepot mansion was constructed as a miniature model and filmed with the camera floating through wintry fog and sleet toward a wrought iron gate, in a shot that paid homage to Citizen Kane's opening tracking shot of Xanadu. The effect was created by combining separate models for the gate and mansion, incorporating photographic effects for atmospheric depth, and a rear-projected silhouette of a figure in the mansion window. Matte World cameraman Wade Childress's teenage daughter served as a photo double for Oswald's father, portrayed elsewhere by Paul Reubens.

=== Miniatures and set design ===
To build both the Cobblepot mansion and Wayne Manor miniatures, Matte World enlisted John Goodson and Howie Weed of Renegade Effects. The Cobblepot mansion was constructed as a three-sided, 1:12 scale model using high-density construction board to simulate a weathered stone appearance. Vacuformed bricks and roof textures were applied to the surface, and architectural details were sculpted in clay, which was molded and cast for reuse. The wrought-iron gate featured cherubs, which were sourced from a garden department store, modified for scale, and textured with acrylic to appear carved from stone. The gate itself was photo-etched from a design drawn by Goodson's brother, David, and etched into brass sheets by Insight Designs.

Both gate and mansion models were mounted on separate motion control tracks, placed on their sides to simulate a floating camera pass. This allowed the gate to move more quickly toward the lens than the mansion, enhancing the illusion of depth. Motion control camera operator Cameron Noble noted that aligning the foreground gate with the mansion in this way was one of the trickier aspects of the shot.

Falling snow was captured in-camera using a three-pass process exposed on a single piece of film. Each pass simulated snow at different depths in the frame: foreground snow (out of focus), midground (in focus), and background (falling through the sky). A process projector behind the camera was used to project snow onto a foamcore screen placed between the mansion and gate. The screen was repositioned for each pass to maintain parallax and focus. Once the camera passed through the "snow zone", the screen was removed for a clean continuation of the move. Additional haze and aerial perspective were added to enhance depth, particularly at the start of the move.

=== Matte paintings ===
For the scene in which the Cobblepots abandon their child at the gates of the Gotham Zoo, a large matte painting, spanning two 4-by-8-foot Masonite panels, was created by artist Bill Mather. The painting incorporated a rear-projection window that matched the silhouetted tree branches and skyline from the live-action footage. The background cityscape was designed to evoke a stylized New York City, with skyscrapers piercing the clouds, creating the "Gotham City" look as a gothic exaggeration of Manhattan.

The layout of the zoo was carefully coordinated with miniature flyover shots that appear later in the film. Mather indicated that the arrangement of pavilions, entrances, and skyline elements was designed to accommodate the film's visual continuity and storytelling needs. A tilt-down camera move and use of a Vaseline-smeared filter helped to selectively blur parts of the painting, simulating atmospheric depth. Noble also introduced subtle, deliberate imperfections into the motion control system to emulate the organic feel of handheld camera work.

=== Gotham sewers sequence ===
The title sequence, featuring the infant Penguin floating in a buoyant wicker basket, from a baby carriage, through Gotham's sewers, was developed by 4-Ward Productions, most known at the time for their work on Terminator 2: Judgment Day (1991). The sequence was conceived as a visual descent into the underworld, a dark parallel to the biblical story of Moses. Visual effects supervisor Robert Skotak explained that the production intended to portray a sinister baptism, with the basket journeying deeper into the catacombs beneath Gotham.

Rather than reeds, the sewer environment featured protruding, rusted rebar, further adding to the unsettling tone. The final live-action scene picks up as the basket arrives at the ruins of the old zoo's Arctic World attraction.

Originally just a single shot of the basket entering the tunnel, the sequence expanded significantly during post-production. Much of it was planned through video storyboards, tested before being presented to director Tim Burton. To create the sewer journey, the production reused miniature tunnel sets originally built for the later Batskiboat chase sequence. These tunnels, scaled at 8 feet wide and just under 8 feet high, represented real-world tunnels about 32 feet in diameter. Only two-thirds of the full circular tunnel was built, with the floor flooded with water.

Tunnel walls were dressed with vacuformed brick sheets, moss, and miniature ladders crafted by modelers Jen Howard, Pat Denver, Doug Moore, and Ricc Ruskuski. Construction involved square steel stock, bendboard undersurfaces, spray foam to seal joints, and full waterproofing. Rick Rische handled most of the painting of the tunnels and dressings for the Batskiboat tunnels, which were then repainted by others for the title sequence. Lighting played a key role in the scene. Reflectorized halogen lights were positioned to highlight the black basket in water, providing specular glints that helped separate it from the background. As the basket floated away, the camera craned down to silhouette it against a lit background. To accommodate the compositing of a background plate featuring computer-generated bats flying across the film's logo, this sewer sequence was shot in VistaVision.

=== Baptism shot and shadow effects ===
One of the key shots in the sequence, referred to as the "baptism" shot, involved the carriage's basket passing through a waterfall. For this close-up, a full-scale basket was used, alternately mounted on a track or sled, depending on the scene. Water was poured from above onto sheet metal to achieve a sheeting effect, and the shot was captured at 48 frames per second to enhance the water effect.

Another complex shot involved the basket casting a fleeting shadow that briefly resembled a penguin. The transition was achieved through a rotating sculpture designed by modeler Jim Towler, with one side shaped like the basket and the other like a penguin. As it rotated, the shadow gradually morphed, distorted by the textured tunnel walls. The final effect was kept subliminal, visible only as a momentary impression.

The entire sewer sequence was conceived less as a showcase of high-end visual effects and more as a moody, atmospheric montage. Skotak noted that the emphasis was on texture, pacing, and tone, designed to match what was expected to be a deeply evocative musical score.

== Sets ==
The sets for Batman Returns were redesigned in Bo Welch's style, including a new Batcave and Wayne Manor. Filming took place entirely on sets, spread across seven soundstages at Warner Bros. (the largest of which had 70-foot ceilings) and included the largest set owned by Universal Pictures. While most scenes were shot on these soundstages, some panoramic shots—such as the camera moving from the base of Shreck's department store to its cat-head-shaped office—were created with detailed miniatures.

Production designer Anton Furst's Academy Award–winning Gotham City set from the 1989 Batman, built on the Pinewood backlot, had been dismantled by the time of Batman Returns, with two Batmobile prototypes in storage recalled for the sequel. Furst, who died in November 1991, had established the noir, claustrophobic foundation of Gotham as a "reverse City of Tomorrow", a hellish, vertical sprawl of skyscrapers that blocked sun and sky. Welch and Burton sought to evolve this look. While Furst's Gotham was "formal and serious", Welch's version was more American and ironic, mixing fascist World's Fair architecture with American urban decay and chaotic zoning.

The sets were designed to feel like a different district of Gotham; if Batman was on the East Side of the city, Batman Returns took place on the West Side. Welch was inspired by German Expressionism, neo-fascist architecture (including Nazi Germany-era styles), American precisionism painters, and photos of the homeless living on the streets in affluent areas. He incorporated Burton's early sketch of Catwoman, with a "very S&M kind of look", by integrating steel and chain elements into the set, creating the impression of a city collapsing in on itself. Welch’s key design principle was the manipulation of space to express emotional and narrative ideas. Verticality emphasized a massive, decaying metropolis dwarfing its inhabitants: "The film is about this alienating, disparate world we live in." The wintertime setting enhanced this contrast, with black-and-white visuals influenced by Citizen Kane and The Third Man. After filming, the wood from the sets was donated to Habitat for Humanity to build low-cost homes for the poor.

Welch's concept designs began by carving out building shapes from cardboard with images of fascist sculptures and depression era machine-age art. The resulting 1 by 4 ft (0.30 by 1.22 m)-tall rough model represented Gotham Plaza, described as a futuristic, oppressive, and "demented caricature" of Rockefeller Center. It was designed to be overbuilt, emphasizing the generic-but-oppressive heart of Gotham's corruption. Despite complaints from the film's financiers about its necessity, Burton insisted on the location with a detailed church overshadowed by plain surroundings.

=== Gotham Plaza ===
The visual centerpiece of the film, and Gotham City itself, was Gotham Plaza, constructed on Stage 16 at Warner Bros., one of the largest soundstages in Hollywood. Unlike the Pinewood outdoor backlot used for Batman's Gotham Square, Gotham Plaza required perspective tricks to simulate city scale indoors. The design combined cartoonish Expressionist architecture with decaying Americana. The main square featured an Orwellian government building flanked by massive statues of muscular men pulling levers, and a cathedral adorned with grotesque figures such as mummies, skeletal creatures, and bug-like forms. The street-level design included relics of a lost industrial age—trolley tracks, metal supports holding up old buildings, and statues sinking into pavement—to convey Gotham’s systemic rot.

Welch said he designed Gotham Plaza first because it would take the longest to build and host much of the film's action, even though the script was still evolving. Construction of the set required up to 250 carpenters working seven days a week during peak production. A reinforced concrete road bed was built eight feet above the soundstage floor to allow for subterranean access by Penguin's gang, as well as an elevated road between key buildings. This elevation helped mask the limits of the set and added a layered visual effect of an aging city.

To simulate the Christmas setting, sets were dressed with artificial snow, with digital snow added in post. For realism, and to support live penguins, large refrigeration units from Aggreko were brought in to lower the stage temperature to near-freezing. This created visible frosty breath from the actors, a detail that furthered the illusion. Welch noted the difficulty of maintaining the cold under hot set lights but found it essential to immerse the cast and crew in the film's chilly, alien world.

Welch designed Gotham to extend four to five blocks in all directions, implying a vast city beyond what the camera revealed.

==== Gotham Plaza miniature ====
Miniatures by Boss Film Studios extended this illusion, adding a towering Gotham skyline—an aspect barely explored in the original film. Model shop supervisor David Jones noted that in Batman, skyscrapers were implied via matte paintings and brief aerial shots. For Batman Returns, more action occurred in the upper city, and new models were required.

Boss Film constructed an 18-foot-tall miniature version of Gotham Plaza, derived from a 1:48 foamcore mockup designed to compensate for the forced perspective of the live-action set. According to effects supervisor John Bruno, the Warner Bros. set was "squeezed" in perspective to fit the stage, so the miniatures had to be expanded 30% in all directions to appear correct. Art director Tom Valentine provided accurate line drawings that modelmakers translated into multi-section miniatures built from plywood, pine, and resin castings. Many structures were five feet wide and sixteen feet tall, requiring detailed stucco work to match the textures of the film's cityscape.

Twelve primary buildings were built for the Gotham Plaza miniature, along with eight background structures and over a dozen "floater" buildings to fill in gaps. Some were reused to extend shots, such as in the scene where Catwoman is carried skyward by an umbrella and dropped into another part of town. Lighting was key: director of photography Garry Waller lit the miniatures from below, using "cracker smoke" to enhance atmosphere. A custom motion-control elevator rig allowed the camera to track from the live-action plaza to the top of the miniature Shreck Building, blending both elements into seamless vertical shots. The miniature set was used for a promotional tie-in for Choice Hotels International, while the full-scale set was refit with a McDonald's for a separate campaign.

=== The Penguin's lair and Arctic World set ===
The Penguin's lair was originally planned for a standard 35-foot soundstage, but Welch found it lacked "majesty" and instead used a 50-foot Universal stage, with a 500,000 U.S. gal (1,900,000 L) tank surrounding a faux-ice island. The set was gradually modified throughout production to suggest ongoing decay. Due to the scale and technical demands of the set, including live penguins and water effects, it was constructed on the largest available soundstage at Universal Studios Lot, rather than at Warner Bros., whose biggest stage was already in use for Gotham Plaza scenes.

The lair was conceived in the gothic tradition of criminal hideouts commonly seen in comic books, such as haunted mansions and decaying industrial buildings. For this film, the hideout took the form of Arctic World, a derelict aquatic pavilion located in the old Gotham Zoo. The set required refrigeration units to maintain the winter setting and ensure a safe environment for the live penguins used throughout filming. Production designer Bo Welch described Arctic World as a blend of visual effects and practical elements: "It was floor-to-ceiling on the biggest soundstage at Universal and three-quarters of it was water... puppet penguins as well as two different species of live penguins, fire effects, explosions." Designed as a once-glamorous, now-decaying tourist attraction, the pavilion featured bleachers, a central performance island, and a dilapidated refreshment stand, an example of what Welch called "elegant decay", consistent with Burton's recurring visual themes from Beetlejuice to Edward Scissorhands.

The central feature of Arctic World was the island platform, constructed to rise 18–20 feet and serve as the primary area for both live and animatronic penguins created by Stan Winston Studio. Because many shots required puppeteers to work beneath the structure, water-tightness was essential. Welch explained the technical challenges involved: "The island was constructed in a tank with a weir wall to keep the water out... It was difficult to make it waterproof, even though we had bilge pumps going twenty-four hours a day".

Adding to the surreal tone of the environment was a malfunctioning, antique air conditioning unit dubbed "The Icebox". This mechanical prop, designed to shake and spark as though barely functioning, was mounted on truck springs for movement and rigged with squib charges to create bursts of sparks. Special effects coordinator Chuck Gaspar said, "We put it on truck springs to dance it around the floor; and there were sparks coming off of it... just firing off the charges from a nail board".

==== Miniature effects ====
While the Arctic World set was constructed full-scale, its surrounding Gotham Zoo location was built in miniature by Stetson Visual Services, with photography and effects handled by The Chandler Group. The model featured a main tabletop landscape with additional "floater" sections to accommodate various camera angles. A motion-control crane system was developed specifically for a flyover shot of the abandoned zoo, allowing the camera to skim across the miniature terrain in a precisely choreographed path.

The miniatures were used not only for establishing shots but also in the film's climax, which features an explosive sequence between Batman and the Penguin. The Chandler Group and Stetson worked in tandem to build and light the elaborate tabletop set. Art director Rick Heinrichs emphasized the importance of production models in achieving the film's stylized aesthetic: "We made character models of all the major sets... What normally happens is an illustrator or production designer will do drawings, and a modelmaker turns it into a clean, white architectural model."

Welch's art department provided Stetson with a quarter-inch-to-the-foot scale model of the zoo, which was then adapted by Stetson and Chandler. Visual effects supervisor Mark Stetson recalled, "We had to reconfigure the miniature and essentially compress all the exhibits a little closer together" based on video test passes shot with a miniature camera rigged to motion control.

To fit within Chandler's 80×80-foot stage, the miniatures were scaled to one-eighth rather than one-sixth scale. The main tabletop section spanned about 40×40 feet, and floating perimeter tables expanded the set to approximately 70×55 feet. The final model took 6–8 weeks to complete. Key elements included handmade wire and plaster pavilions, 700 miniature trees, park benches, fencing, and the bridge from which baby Oswald Cobblepot is thrown in the opening scene. Many of the zoo structures were designed to resemble temporary installations from an old world's fair, employing Rose Parade float construction techniques, such as bent wire and screen covered in plaster, aged and weathered to appear abandoned and rotting.

Lighting the miniature sets presented challenges in matching the stylized, low-light look of the live-action photography. Chandler's director of photography, Tim Angulo, had to reinterpret the predominantly moonlit aesthetic of the main unit footage. Supervisor John Scheele noted, "There was an over-saturated blue overall and almost no fill light in the live-action". With Burton's approval, they introduced additional lighting for visual clarity and dramatic effect. For example, a dramatic "God light" was used to highlight the polar bear statue atop Arctic World. Warmer lights were used selectively to accent features such as the rubber ducky ride, crab pavilion, and aviary, allowing their original colors to be visible in the dark miniature environment.

==== Flyover ====
For the miniature flyover shot over the zoo grounds, a more nuanced lighting approach was used. Using an 18mm wide-angle lens stopped down to f/16 with six-second exposures, Angulo achieved a luminous, ethereal effect that conveyed a magical, floating sensation. Scheele noted that lighting the entire miniature terrain required subtlety, especially around the zoo entrance sign, where pools of warmer light simulated streetlights spilling onto the colder surrounding area. Small details such as breaches in the perimeter fence, suggesting animals escaping, were added by the effects crew to enhance realism.

The camera crew was enamored with the miniature landscape and sought to create a fluid move that captured the park's eerie, decayed charm. Burton specified a relatively straightforward flight path: entering through the zoo gate, crossing the bridge, passing through the giant crab claw pavilion, and culminating at the flickering lights of Arctic World. Movement tests were conducted by Fink, Baker, and Scheele to refine the timing and path. Adjustments continued throughout production, with Burton providing specific instructions, such as adding a slight roll as the camera passed through the crab's claw and avoiding a dive into the riverbed. Because the miniatures' pavilions were modular, they could be repositioned to optimize the shot, including a last-minute relocation of the bridge to improve its cinematic framing.

To execute the flyover, the team engineered a custom motion-control camera rig with a boom arm extending 20 to 30 feet above the miniature set. The final rig featured a 20-foot vertical reach and a 22-foot horizontal extension over the set, with an additional 10-foot arm on standby for further expansion. Built akin to a construction crane, this design allowed the camera to clear tall miniature structures without collision and simplified programming by employing linear axes rather than traditional arcing boom paths.

The camera system incorporated a pitching snorkel lens, providing full pan, tilt, and roll capabilities to achieve the floating point of view desired for the shot. This fully stepper-motorized system was compact enough to navigate tight spaces within the miniature set. During filming, the camera assistant even manually removed the top of the zoo sign, the only miniature element obstructing the lens path, to allow uninterrupted passage through the scene. The slow filming speed necessary for the high frame rate complemented this careful coordination and enabled the fluid, dynamic flyover effect.

==== Finale pyrotechnics ====
The climactic sequence set in the zoo grounds of Batman Returns featured extensive pyrotechnics and complex lighting challenges. To maintain sufficient depth of field when shooting at the high-speed rate of 120 frames per second, the effects team employed powerful 18,000-watt HMI lights to fully illuminate the set during explosions and other pyrotechnic effects. For the full-scale set explosions, a fireproof double-decker structure was built out of camera range to deploy flaming debris down a chute through the skylight. Due to fire department restrictions on propane use, methane gas was employed as the fuel source, despite its relative scarcity in pressurized form. Fire bars and winches allowed controlled flickering fire effects to be seen through windows at the skylight level, adding to the dramatic destruction of Penguin’s lair.

=== Shreck's Building ===
The Shreck Building, a prominent location in Batman Returns, was extensively realized through both physical sets and detailed miniatures. To achieve the necessary camera angles without revealing the foreshortened scale, the miniature model was carefully perched and constructed so it could be viewed convincingly from any perspective. The Boss Film team faced the challenge of closely matching the design features of the live-action Stage 16 structures. Visual effects supervisor John Bruno explained that unlike other films where miniatures and live-action could be shot separately with creative liberties, Batman Returns required near-perfect consistency due to frequent intercutting between the two formats.

Miniatures played a significant role throughout the production, particularly in sequences transitioning from Gotham's streets to the penthouse offices and rooftops of the Shreck Building. One notable scene involves a crane-up shot from street level to the giant rotating cat head atop the building's penthouse suite, where Max Shreck plots his corporate takeover. Boss Film was tasked with executing this shot. Bruno recounted: "We were asked to devise a way to crane up off of the Shreck set at Stage 16, accelerate to a blur and end up on the giant rotating cat head that sat above Shreck Tower, which was a twenty-fourth-scale model." Using a forty-eighth-scale mockup of the Stage 16 set for reference, the team calculated that the vertical camera move would require nearly 40 feet of travel and had to be repeatable to within one-thousandth of an inch. Mark West designed the elevator rig, a mechanism capable of carrying a 65mm camera package vertically at speeds up to 32 miles per hour, with repeatability within five-thousandths of an inch. Garry Waller supervised the live-action shot on Stage 16 and later adapted the motion control data for the miniature shoot. Because the live-action move was slower than expected, the miniature camera move was sped up to maintain the illusion of scale, blending the vertical pan with a beam to smoothly transition the faster motion up to the cat head model.

The Shreck Building's distinctive corporate logo features a cartoonish, maniacally grinning cat head, which visually combines elements reminiscent of Felix the Cat and Sir John Tenniel's Cheshire Cat illustrations from Alice in Wonderland. Burton commented on the symbolism behind such logos, noting a common American corporate practice of using friendly mascots to project warmth, but often with an undercurrent of menace. He said, "You think of the Pillsbury Doughboy or the Planters peanut—they're cute but there's something evil about them".

A main action sequence unfolds on the streets of Gotham Plaza, where Catwoman confronts Batman moments before detonating a bomb that devastates the Shreck department store. The live-action pyrotechnics for this explosion were executed on the Stage 16 set, where Gaspar and his team deployed approximately eighteen mortars concealed within Christmas decorations in the lobby. These mortars combined conventional explosive charges with map gas mortars, a stabilized gas capable of producing controlled and variable flame effects. Gaspar explained, "The gas was in big mortar holding tanks; so once it was released and it ignited, we could control the fire. We could blow it ten feet, twenty feet, five hundred feet if we wanted." To simulate the shattered glass windows, tempered glass was detonated using small detonators wired to batteries, similar to bullet hit effects. Because a large number of windows were shattered simultaneously, a robust generator was brought in to ensure sufficient electrical current. The massive explosion produced a towering fireball that rose into the studio grid, prompting the Burbank Fire Department to stand by during filming. Gaspar recalled, "The fire department got a little excited, but we had enough fire people on hand that I wasn't concerned about it. Tim had said he wanted it big!" The set was rebuilt afterward for subsequent filming.

==== Shreck's ball ====
The Penguin escalates his campaign of terror against Gotham by targeting Shreck's son, Chip, in retaliation for Shreck's betrayal, at the Shreck Building during the high-society event known as "Max Shreck's Max-squerade Christmas Ball."

Translating the spectacle of a ballroom dance floor exploding, sending dancers skyward, into live-action posed a particularly daunting challenge for Gaspar and his team. Gaspar admitted, "I was more concerned about this one job than any other part of the whole picture. It was a dangerous, dangerous move".

The explosion's epicenter, a sixteen-foot-diameter section of the dance floor nicknamed "the hole", was rigged with pneumatic cylinders connected to stunt performers via harnesses. These cables, approximately one-eighth of an inch in diameter and thirty feet long, were powered by compressed air and anchored to the stage’s high side. The harnesses secured the stunt performers snugly from legs to chest to endure the rapid upward force. Gaspar described the effect: "The cables actually snapped them away. We timed it so that we detonated the dance floor once their feet were about fourteen inches off the ground".

The explosion itself was a carefully timed sequence involving three cues: pulling the stunt performers upward, electronically shattering tempered glass to create an opening, and then detonating the floor. The stunt performers were flung as far as fifteen to eighteen feet from the blast zone. Despite extensive padding and rehearsals, some performers were slammed against the walls, though injuries were limited to minor scratches.

Because the dance floor scene was well-lit and contained complex architectural elements, including musicians on a balcony, removing the visible stunt wires was a significant visual effects challenge. Fink noted that wire removal was painstaking, with Pacific Data Images (PDI) executing extensive work to digitally erase the wires. Fink lamented that wires were not painted bright orange on set, a common practice to facilitate post-production removal, as the crew mistakenly believed black wires would be less visible. This decision complicated the cleanup process.

=== Wayne Manor and the Batsignal ===
The Wayne Manor interior was only partially built, primarily a staircase and fireplace, designed to suggest a much larger structure. The establishing shot of Wayne Manor, with the batsignal piercing through the clouds above, marked a visual departure from the 1989 film. Whereas the original had featured location shooting at Knebworth House outside London to evoke Old World grandeur, Batman Returns reimagined Wayne Manor to appear more like a haunted mansion.

Originally tasked with painting the establishing shot of Wayne Manor and the batsignal, Matte World expanded the effect into a multilayered in-camera composite when an additional shot of the manor from a slightly altered angle was needed. The four-by-four-foot mansion miniature, built by Renegade Effects, was combined with painted backgrounds to create the iconic imagery. The grounds of Wayne Manor were similarly crafted from commonplace materials: a broad twenty-by-twenty-foot rolling hillside was formed from cardboard boxes draped with king-size bedsheets, covered in baking soda, and dotted with miniature trees fashioned from neighborhood twigs wrapped with fine-gauge wires to achieve realistic branch tapering.

To produce the batsignal itself—a responsibility Matte World maintained throughout production—a slide of the bat emblem, derived from artwork, was projected onto fiberfill cloud material adhered to a lexan sheet. Due to the dim projection, exposure times ranged between three and four frames per second to properly register the symbol on film. To capture the batsignal against moving clouds as seen from the Penguin's sewer lair, Matte World employed an intricate multiplane effect. Sculpted dacron clouds were affixed to glass plates mounted on a motion control rig, and shot in conjunction with a painted skyscraper backdrop and the projected batsignal. Effects cameraman Wade Childress and matte artist Brian Flora meticulously adjusted lighting to achieve a convincing composite.

A significant technical hurdle was balancing the exposure of the Batsignal's symbol with that of the projected beam of light. While filming the symbol on solid fiberfill clouds was straightforward, attempting to capture both the symbol and the beam simultaneously proved difficult due to their differing light intensities and surfaces—solid clouds versus smoke particles. Matte World's solution was to first expose the bat symbol onto the sky, then rewind the unprocessed film and, using a new camera, rotoscope the symbol area. The beam was hand-painted and re-exposed onto the original negative through a burn-in process to control exposure levels precisely. This method of isolating and combining separate elements allowed for greater control over the final image's tonal relationships.

To add visual dynamism, Fink suggested projecting the batsignal against moving clouds. Matte World created this effect by attaching fiberfill clouds to three large scrims, each measuring approximately twenty feet by ten feet, mounted on motion control tracks. By artfully sculpting the fiberfill to form naturalistic cloud shapes and backlighting the layers, the team crafted a three-dimensional diorama that existed "in the eye of the camera". The layered movement involved a static base layer, a mid-level layer moving slowly, and a top layer moving more rapidly, together creating convincing depth and perspective. Additional fiberfill was adhered to bridal tulle, a translucent material that mimicked artificial smoke to enhance atmospheric depth.

A Victorian-era-inspired mechanical device relayed the batsignal's call to Wayne inside the mansion. This rooftop reflector system collected skylight and redirected it through a series of mirrors, eventually projecting the signal beam into Wayne's darkened library. Designed by production artist Marty Kline, the contraption resembled intricate dental tools or Jules Verne-style machinery, featuring belts, gears, and moving parts. Effects supervisor Howie Weed and machinist Bryan Dewe fabricated the mechanism from solid aluminum, incorporating stepper motors, worm gears, and articulated rods to enable realistic rotation, tilt, and pan movements. The device was fully functional, reflecting the production’s dedication to blending imaginative design with practical engineering.

The final shot of the reflected bat signal beam streaming through the library window was captured live on set, with Keaton reacting to the projection of the bat emblem. Facing similar exposure challenges as Matte World's miniature work, the team composited the symbol and beam optically: a matte was created to repair damage to the projected bat's wing caused by projector heat during filming, while the beam was double-exposed as a burn-in to brighten the scene. Keaton's face was naturally illuminated by the symbol's light, while the composited beam enhanced the effect. The coordinated timing of symbol and beam activation was achieved through optical compositing rather than on-set cueing, ensuring seamless integration of all elements.

A separate scene included a distinctive point-of-view shot from the Penguin's perspective, showing the batsignal shining through the night sky beyond the bars of his sewer lair. This multilayered Matte World effect was overseen by Brian Flora and involved a complex assembly of painted and sculpted elements. Flora created a detailed painting of city buildings, while the sky beyond was formed using sculpted dacron clouds mounted on glass plates fitted to a motion control mover. Flora described the process as an opportunity to work in a three-dimensional visual domain. He painted the buildings and sculpted the clouds, collaborating with Wade Childress to supervise the precise lighting. The buildings were selectively brightened using focused ink lights to punch up certain areas, enhancing contrast and visual interest. Lighting the clouds proved challenging due to the need for a subtle haze to maintain realism; the clouds had to appear slightly brighter than the buildings to ensure clear edge definition, avoiding tonal blending that would obscure the silhouette of the architecture. The sky was backlit to simulate moonlight, with clouds positioned in front rendered darker to enhance depth. The entire composite involved multiple scrims placed between the glass painting and the clouds, as well as in front of the scene, allowing independent flashing of each layer to control exposure subtly. This layering enabled differences in brightness as fine as a tenth of a photographic stop to be detected in the dailies, illustrating the precision of the effect work.

=== Batcave ===
Bruce Wayne's descent into the Batcave was conceived by Burton and Welch as entering a cavernous expanse of shale walls and perilous precipices. Wide shots of the cave interior were created by compositing live-action stage sets with expansive matte paintings extending the cave’s dimensions. Specific live-action scenes took place on full-scale sets constructed at Warner Bros. studios. For a surreal and memorable approach to Batman's descent into his lair, Burton commissioned Gaspar to create an iron maiden-inspired entrance to the Batcave's inner sanctum. In the shot, Batman closes the entrance behind him as pneumatic spikes shoot out and retract around his figure with mechanical precision. Gaspar explained, "The spikes all had to be done pneumatically. Each spike had its own little cylinder. There were something like five to seven thousand dollars just in pneumatic cylinders. One switch controlled everything, so the spikes would zip out and contract individually".

The Batcave itself underwent a significant redesign for Batman Returns. The original 1989 Batcave, styled by Furst, had featured a Gothic, Phantom of the Opera–inspired look with skyscraper foundations jutting through the cave walls, a somewhat incongruous design choice given the cave's supposed remote woodland location. The new Batcave was envisioned as a cavern with sheer shale walls and dramatic precipices over deep, bottomless chasms. The Batcave's work areas were constructed as set pieces on a Warner Bros. soundstage, while Matte World artist Bill Mather extended the environment through detailed matte paintings to convey the vast cave interior beyond the physical set.

To create the matte paintings, Matte World visited the Batcave set and photographed it using a VistaVision camera to capture latent images from angles approved by Burton. These paintings were then composited onto the original live-action negatives, with further processing at Video Image, where computer-generated bats were added to the scene. Because Burton intended to rely heavily on matte paintings to establish the cave's scope, the physical set itself was relatively modest, an eight-foot-high area that did not convey the cavernous depth ultimately shown on screen. Mather recalled, "The biggest set in the world couldn't provide what the matte shot ultimately would, which was this huge cavern with stalactites and stalagmites going back in perspective." Burton desired a surreal shale texture for the cave, featuring two precipices converging with a narrow gap between them. "He wanted it weird—and we gave him weird".

Two distinct Batcave scenes required different painting techniques. One was a high-angle establishing shot showing the full cave layout, while the other was a lower-angle, closer view of Bruce Wayne working on the Batmobile on one precipice as Alfred enters from the opposite side. Mather described the painting process: "The different textures... were established by the shale look of the live-action plate. There were a lot of intense blues and purples which were fun since I rarely work with those 'unnatural' colors". The painting also featured a "floating island of rock" with an unnatural taper, further emphasizing the fantasy quality of the environment.

A technical challenge arose during the scene in which Alfred discusses a costume party invitation with Bruce Wayne. The highlight on the edges of the precipices brought the two points of rock formations too close together on the original negative matte painting. To correct this, Fink worked with artist Richard Hollander after the shot was scanned digitally. Fink recounted, "I sat down with Richard Hollander and sketched where the tip should be, the distance between the opening. It was a digital composite; so after the shot was scanned into the computer, Richard was able to paint out the tip by picking up some blacks in the background and painting them back in".

=== Rooftops ===
The various rooftop sequences were filmed on a specially constructed set on a separate Warner Bros. soundstage. This expansive set included Selina Kyle's apartment and approximately fifty permanent structures forming the soundstage perimeter, alongside eighteen movable "wild" rooftop pieces of varying sizes that filled the central area. Art director Bo Welch described the rooftop set as "very dense and romantic", with buildings manipulated in scale to create depth. Selina's apartment was permanently integrated into the perimeter, allowing for shots looking both into and out of the apartment from the rooftops. The wild rooftop pieces were built from wood framing reinforced with steel, detailed with plastic brick, lathe, plaster, and paint, and mounted on wheels for repositioning. Selina's apartment included a steel beam running through the middle of the room, implying it was built around a structural girder and enhancing its bleak irony.

One rooftop fight scene features Batman hanging from a ledge by Catwoman's whip, suspended high above Gotham Plaza. This shot combined live-action set work with Boss Film's optical composite effects. Michael Keaton was filmed hanging approximately fifteen feet above stunt pads in front of a front-projected bluescreen. The composite incorporated Boss miniatures of the Gotham Cathedral and the Shreck Building to create the Gotham skyline backdrop.

Visual effects supervisor Mike Fink explained that after capturing the bluescreen footage of Keaton, the team had to precisely match the perspective of the miniature backgrounds to align with the actor's angle. While the initial composite matched the storyboard closely and looked effective, Burton requested repositioning of the background elements. This adjustment complicated the composite process because some key visual cues that helped integrate Batman into the background were lost. Nevertheless, the shots were successfully completed, largely due to the efforts of Michael Cooper, Boss Film’s optical lead.

== Stunts and additional visual effects ==
=== Selina's fall ===
For the sequence where Selina Kyle is pushed out of the penthouse window of the Shreck building by Max, Kyle crashes through several successive levels of awnings, each embossed with the company's grinning cat logo, before landing in a snowy alley below. The sequence began with a locked-off live-action shot of a stuntwoman falling from the office window, followed by longer shots that established the fall. To capture the descent through the awnings, Boss Film created a detailed one-twelfth-scale miniature of the Shreck Building. The model, nearly twenty-five feet tall in scale, was rotated on its side for filming convenience, allowing the motion control camera to move parallel to the floor rather than following an arcing boom. This facilitated a straighter, more controlled simulated fall through the miniature awnings, which were pulled apart by hidden wires during the shoot. Cinematographer Garry Waller operated a motion control camera equipped with a snorkel lens to program the fall sequence through the miniature set.

Seeking to add dynamic background detail, John Bruno spotted a miniature van originally built for DHL commercials in the Boss model shop and proposed including it turning the corner of the Shreck Building below during the fall. The van was attached to a simple swing-arm mechanism moving perpendicular to the stage floor to provide subtle but effective background movement.

Following Burton's approval of the miniature background, the bluescreen shots of Michelle Pfeiffer were filmed. Sitting on a stool with air blown through her hair to simulate freefall, Pfeiffer performed the scene in slow motion to synchronize with the preprogrammed motion control camera moves. Bruno explained that Burton's intent was to visually convey Selina's transformation during the fall, capturing the terror and intensity in her eyes as she ripped through the awnings. Neil Krepela shot Pfeiffer against the bluescreen as the motion control dolly repeated the fall move, allowing both the actress and director to focus on performance rather than camera operation.

=== Flying umbrellas ===
True to his comic book origins, the Penguin arms himself with a variety of weaponized umbrellas. One such umbrella, equipped with helicopter-like spinning blades, features in a scene where it airlifts the Penguin off the ground. To achieve this effect, DeVito was physically suspended by a custom rig designed by Gaspar and his crew: "We had an apparatus hooked up behind the set which actually picked him up through a metal strap that was around his waist", Gaspar explained. "It was like a levitation system, with a forty-foot aluminum track on wheels. An arm would come out through the wall and pick him up. The camera had to follow him up at just the right angle so as not to see the mechanical arm coming from the wall to his body." The spinning umbrella itself was vacuformed to conceal a small, gear-driven motor. Once activated, a separate ceiling mechanism triggered the release of the umbrella's "gores"—the curved panels—which flew off in all directions.

The first attempt to film the scene resulted in an unexpected delay: the mechanical arm's counterweight was not properly balanced against DeVito's weight, leaving the actor dangling forty feet above the set. DeVito remained in good spirits, joking with the crew for the twenty minutes it took to fix the issue.

After the Penguin and Catwoman's alliance ends when he makes an unwanted advance, he straps her to one of his flying umbrellas and sends her hurtling into the night sky. The sequence depicts Catwoman soaring past Gotham's darkened skyscrapers, eventually disappearing into a tunnel of city lights. To create this effect, Boss Film Studios employed a complex multiplane technique combining miniature buildings, matte paintings, and optical compositing. A bluescreen element of a stuntwoman was filmed in front of a 65mm camera, allowing the team to use their zoom aerial printer (ZAP) to reduce her size in the frame as she drifted into the distance. The real umbrella she clung to during filming was intended only for reference, it was rotoscoped out by Nina Solerno and replaced with a computer-generated version that was rebuilt and match-moved to track with her motion. The combined Catwoman and CG umbrella elements were then scanned onto 65mm film for final compositing with the painted and miniature Gotham environment.

Creating Gotham's sprawling skyline fell to art director Brent Boates and matte painter Michele Moen. They worked to integrate director of photography Garry Waller's motion-control camera moves across the foreground miniatures. The background required two matte paintings: one showing the cityscape beyond the rotating rooftop Shreck cat-head sculpture, and another wide shot featuring the light tunnel to the right of a miniature plaza building. White smoke and steam drifted through the scene along Catwoman's flight path, enhancing the atmosphere. To simulate the twinkling city lights, Moen punched holes in black glass to create a field of blinking lights, composited in a separate pass. A smokestack element was also rear-projected and burned in to deepen the atmospheric perspective. The matte paintings, each roughly six-by-three feet in size, were split and joined by a miniature plaza building at center screen, with Roto making a split-matte to seamlessly blend the elements.

=== Christmas Tree lighting ceremony ===
The Christmas tree lighting ceremony in Gotham Plaza featured detailed miniature street models, with Doug Moore and Pat Denver responsible for their painting and finishing. During the event, the Penguin causes chaos, including the fatal fall of the Ice Princess (played by Cristi Conaway) from a skyscraper rooftop. This fall was achieved using a forced perspective shot, with Conaway filmed on a specially developed crane rig that boomed down into the plaza miniature. Cinematographer Garry Waller operated the rig from directly above to capture the descent.

At the climax of the ceremony, a flock of bats, controlled by the Penguin, erupts from the Christmas tree, swooping down on the crowd. All bat appearances in the film, from the sewer flocks to the plaza attack, were computer-generated by the Visual Effects company Video Image. Animator Andy Kopra was tasked with creating realistic, organic bat shapes that interacted with live actors. Richard Hollander, head of the Video Image CG department, directed the team to produce fully rendered bats from the outset rather than simple wire-frame models. The realism of shape, size, color, and motion blur was crucial to maintaining the illusion of bats, as any lack of detail would undermine their believability.

The animation utilized a Symbolics XL-1200 computer to program bat behaviors, employing the "Boids" behavioral animation system to simulate flock dynamics. Pixar's Photorealistic Renderman software was then used to render the bats, applying motion blur and producing images composited with the scanned live-action backgrounds. Video Image created bat flocks for 22 shots throughout the film. For the Christmas tree shot, Kopra used matte layering to create the effect of bats emerging from within the dense branches, rendering bats separately in front of, and behind, the tree to maintain spatial realism. The animation parameters were adjusted like controls on robotic bats, enabling changes in speed, direction, and behavior for each shot.

Bat models were based on anatomical wing structure, generated through rotated outlines and cross sections, then animated to simulate wing flapping. To intensify their impact in close-ups, the bats were scaled to more than a foot in size and rendered with motion blur to enhance realism. Fink noted that Batman Returns was among the first films to digitally transfer CGI shots between different effects houses without any film prints being exchanged. The dark nighttime setting lit mostly in blue posed challenges for compositing, necessitating multiple iterations to perfect the tonal range.

Mechanical bats, rigged by Optic Nerve, were also employed on set to add realism. These were attached via wires to actors, including the Ice Princess, enhancing physical interaction with the digital swarms. Besides the plaza sequences, Video Image also created computer-generated bat swarms for scenes such as the opening titles and the batcave. The bats' organic, lifelike movements contrasted with earlier mechanical cloaking effects. To simulate subtle crowd movements during the chaotic plaza attack, non-articulated puppets attached to wires were manipulated off-camera, with modelmakers Monty Schook and John Merritt positioning figures on the miniature set.

=== Flying Batman ===
As chaos reigns over the Christmas tree lighting ceremony, Batman opens his cape and swoops down over a crowd in Gotham Plaza. Instead of attempting the complex and risky task of flying a stuntman through a full-scale set, the production created a detailed puppet to portray Batman's flight. The puppet was built and operated at Boss Film by Laine Liska and Craig Talmy, combining inexpensive bicycle parts for gross movements with fine manual rod animation for subtle motions. Prior to the Christmas tree bat release scene, a notable over-the-shoulder shot shows Batman perched like a gargoyle on the rooftops overlooking Gotham Plaza. Boss Film used an in-camera forced perspective technique, placing a stunt actor amid miniature Plaza structures, to avoid traditional compositing.

The over-the-shoulder Batman shot required precise eye-line matching, achieved by raising a bat-suited stuntman twenty feet above the miniature plaza on a lift and adjusting his position while monitoring video playback. After filming multiple takes, the chosen shot was reversed in post-production to improve its visual impact.

The flying Batman puppet was crafted from rubberized fabric stretched over a hollow steel-and-lead armature with articulated joints. Suspended on wires and controlled by rods extending from its feet, the puppet's weight was critical to prevent unwanted jiggle during puppeteering. To synchronize the puppet's movements precisely with motion control backgrounds, Talmy devised a rig that combined pulley suspension with motion control commands, eliminating slack and allowing computer-driven, frame-by-frame positioning. This rig was assembled using bicycle wheels, ball bearings, and other parts in a makeshift, "guerrilla effects" fashion. The puppet sat on a six-foot-diameter steel and wood turntable equipped with a 200:1 gear reduction motor that allowed fine control of pitch and banking motions. As the motion control camera moved through its programmed sequence, the turntable rotated correspondingly, enabling integration of the puppet's flight with the live-action background plates. The puppet was later encased in glass and presented as a gift to producer Larry Franco.

=== The Penguin's death ===
In the climactic confrontation, the Penguin unleashes a swarm of bats to attack Batman, but the creatures turn on him instead, forcing the Penguin to crash through a skylight into the waters of his Arctic World lair below. For this bat attack sequence, DeVito had to react to invisible CGI bats designed by Video Image animator Andy Kopra. Kopra explained the challenge of synchronizing the bats' behavior with DeVito's performance: rather than controlling individual bats directly, he adjusted simulation parameters to match the actor's reactions. The bats' size and speed were exaggerated to create a more threatening and believable attack.

After staggering from the assault, the Penguin falls through a skylight as the lair begins to shake from missile impacts. A stuntman in a Penguin costume performed a forty-foot free-fall through breakaway glass into a water tank approximately fourteen feet deep. The skylight was constructed from steel, with sections of tempered glass, sheet lead, and breakaway glass precisely rigged to accommodate the stunt. The stunt was especially difficult because the stuntman could not see his landing target after the glass was installed, requiring careful calculation and multiple tests to ensure safety. Despite the risks, the stunt was successfully executed without injury.

=== The finale ===
Batman Returns concludes with a crane-up shot ascending through the vertical layers of Gotham City, ultimately revealing the iconic batsignal emblazoned on a cloud. This complex effect was achieved by Matte World using a multiplane miniature setup filmed horizontally along a 40-foot motion control track. The final shot involved a layered composite of live-action footage, scale model buildings, and matte paintings. Initially, smaller-scale foamcore models were used for visualization and to demonstrate perspective shifts to director Tim Burton before scaling up to full production size to maintain consistent focus across all planes.

The sequence begins with a live-action plate of Wayne's black Rolls Royce driving down a Gotham street, filmed on the Warner Bros. backlot with rear projection. As the vehicle moves, the motion control camera tracks horizontally across a multi-layered miniature cityscape. The foreground features a one-eighth-scale alley with steam pipes and trusses, the midground includes one-seventy-second-scale buildings, and the background is a matte painting of Gotham's skyline. The bat signal appears projected onto fiberfill clouds on background scrims. Artist Chris Evans described the shot as more expansive than a traditional crane shot, likening it to a helicopter lifting off from a second-story window and ascending into the sky. Parallax effects between the miniature, live-action plate, and painting create the illusion of depth and dimensionality despite the blend of two- and three-dimensional elements.

Craig Barron noted that simply projecting the live-action plate onto a matte painting without miniatures would have lacked perspective change; so, miniature elements were strategically placed to fool the eye and enhance the illusion of moving through the cityscape. The camera work demanded precision, with assistant Rich McKay tracking latent image film exposures to maintain first-generation quality on the original negatives, ensuring the composite shots integrated cleanly into production footage.

Originally, the crane-up was intended to be the film's final shot. However, preview audiences expressed confusion over the fate of Selina Kyle / Catwoman following the explosion in the Penguin's lair. The earlier cut included only a suggestive shadow of Catwoman catching Batman's attention as he drove away, which proved too ambiguous. In response, during the last week of May, the production shot a new closing scene featuring a Catwoman double gazing up at the batsignal against a bluescreen. This element was then composited into the foreground of the original crane-up shot to provide clearer closure for the character's fate. The last-minute addition was completed just before final delivery.

== Penguins ==
Stan Winston Studio provided animatronic penguins and costumes to supplement the Penguin's army. Thirty animatronic versions were made: ten each of the 18-inch (46 cm) black-footed, 32-inch (81 cm) King, and 36-inch (91 cm) Emperor penguins. Costumes worn by "little people" were slightly larger than the animatronics; the actors controlled walking, the mechanized heads were remote-controlled, and the wings were puppeteered. Dyed black chicken feathers were used for the penguin bodies. McCreery's designs for the penguin army initially included a flamethrower, which was replaced with a rocket launcher. Mechanical-effects designers Richard Landon and Craig Caton-Largent supervised the manufacture of the animatronics, which required nearly 200 different mechanical parts to control the head, neck, eyes, beak, and wings. Boss Film Studios produced the CGI penguins.

The Penguin's army of penguins included computer-generated penguins created by Boss Film using the same flocking program employed by Video Image for the bats. For major sequences, such as the march on Gotham Plaza, a wire-frame penguin model was developed with fully rendered textures and colors to simulate the entire penguin army digitally. Live or puppet penguins were used for close-up shots, while long shots showing the entire penguin force were achieved with digital animation.

Live penguins, typically used in wide shots, mingled on the Arctic World island set alongside mechanical puppets and penguin-suited actors, creating a layered effect of different penguin types and sizes. Puppet penguins were strategically positioned on the set using foam dummy models as placeholders. Over time, placement efficiency improved from several hours to just over an hour per setup. To create the illusion of a larger penguin population, puppets were repositioned between shots so that about thirty puppets could appear as sixty on camera. Most puppeteers operated beneath the island stage, which was only four feet high, making the working conditions cramped and challenging, especially given persistent water leaks that required continuous pumping. For isolated shots near the edges of the island, puppeteers wore white suits to blend into the snow and ice, with bushes and other camouflage used to hide their presence. Animating the puppets required careful attention to DeVito's eye-line and reactions, with control cables sometimes extending up to fifteen feet.

Puppeteers also controlled servo-actuated faces and wings on larger penguin puppets, while actors inside suits provided basic body movement. These little people in suits faced physical challenges, such as limited arm mobility and the risk of falling while wearing heavy costumes. Suit construction required actors to be lifted into the costumes, which featured ventilation holes and velcro closures for comfort and ease of dressing. On-camera time was limited to about forty-five minutes to avoid exhaustion. The blending of live penguins, puppets, and suited actors made it difficult to distinguish between real and artificial birds. Even Burton was occasionally fooled, once mistaking a real penguin for a puppet while reviewing dailies.

One scene shows the Penguin rallying his army for an assault, with a Busby Berkeley–inspired shot of penguins diving into Arctic World's waters. Since penguins would not dive from the planned two-and-a-half-foot platform, CG penguins were created for the effect. Air mortars simulated diving splashes, while Stan Winston's puppets were used in the foreground. Additional churning-water effects were animated and composited to enhance the underwater illusion.

For the march on Gotham Plaza, live penguins carried missile payloads in the middle ground, while puppet penguins were shot separately and composited into wide shots. Due to the logistics of the Stage 16 Gotham Plaza set, which lacked access for puppeteers beneath the floor, a combination of live penguins, computer graphics, and puppets was used to populate the scene efficiently. During the penguin army's arrival at Gotham Plaza, a high-angle CGI shot from the Shreck building shows the penguins entering the plaza. This shot was expanded late in production to include the penguins stopping, turning 180 degrees, and retreating after Batman jams their signal. The Boss computer graphics team quickly delivered the expanded sequence without sacrificing quality, despite the tight schedule.

=== The Penguin's speech to the penguins ===
After being exposed as a criminal, the Penguin retreats underground to rally his army of penguins for an assault on Gotham. This penguin army was created through a blend of computer-generated birds by Boss Film, puppet penguins by Stan Winston Studio, and three species of live penguins. Boss Film's visual effects team, led by Jim Rygiel, faced the challenge of seamlessly blending CGI penguins with live footage. Using videotaped references of real penguins walking on gridded backdrops, they employed a flocking program, similar to that used for the CGI bats, to animate realistic walk cycles, turns, and random individual behaviors. Each penguin had programmed paths and unique movement patterns.

Because live penguins were difficult to direct, the Stan Winston puppet penguins were essential for controllable performances, especially in the film's climax where the penguin army marches and launches rockets strapped to their backs. The puppets included thirty mechanical penguins and six articulated suits for elder penguins portrayed by little people. The mechanical puppets were crafted under the supervision of Richard Landon and Craig Caton. Each of the three penguin species was sculpted over armatures with slight variations to avoid uniformity. Vacuform shells covered plaster positives, which were then assembled with fur cloth and segmented neck bands to replicate head bobbing. Fiberglass skulls, beaks, and sub-assemblies were also produced before handing the puppets to the mechanical department.

Certain artistic liberties were taken in the penguin designs. For example, elder penguins were given furrowed brows to convey intelligence, despite real penguins lacking such features. Suits for little people required anatomical modifications, including the use of fur rather than feathers for better appearance and durability. Fabric specialist Karen Mason developed custom dyed fake fur with varying densities and coloring to simulate natural penguin markings. Each animatronic puppet contained about 194 mechanical parts and was operated by two joystick controllers and two radio controls, managing head, neck, eyes, beaks, and wing movements. The puppet suits shared similar remote-control setups, with the performers providing larger body movements.

=== Rocket Launch ===
With Alfred's help, Batman turns the penguins against their master and launches rockets towards the Arctic World base. Due to the danger of the rocket launches, neither live penguins nor live puppeteers were present near the pyrotechnic effects. The puppets were mounted securely, with Gaspar's crew rigging monofilament guide wires behind all thirty penguin puppets, each armed with two missiles. The sixty rockets were fired in waves of twenty, launched to the soundstage roof twenty to thirty feet above, even though the missiles were out of frame at about fifteen feet. Puppeteers were connected to their puppets by cable controllers and dressed as snowbanks and gullies to remain hidden during filming. Some logistical challenges arose, such as catching spent rockets falling back along the wires during a second salvo, but the rockets were cool enough to be handled barehanded.

Missile explosion shots were filmed at The Chandler Group's stage using a miniature old zoo set coated in a special fire-retardant urethane spray foam from Foam-Tec. This foam prevented the toxic cyanide gas typical of burning foam, ensuring safer pyrotechnic work. The zoo grounds were constructed mainly from chicken wire, paper, and a couple of inches of this fire-resistant foam to provide strength. Before model construction, extensive tests and consultations were held involving Stetson Visual Services, The Chandler Group, Fink, and pyrotechnics expert Thaine Morris. Early tests demonstrated that miniature explosions, smoke trails, and snow and debris sprays could be effectively captured in-camera without requiring optical enhancements, enabling multiple camera angles and takes.

When Thaine Morris became unavailable, Joseph Viskocil stepped in to assist with pyrotechnics, bringing experience and collaborating with a team to rig, dress, and operate the miniature effects over a week-long shoot. Viskocil explained that miniature pyrotechnics require making small-scale effects appear large, which involves controlling camera speed and lens choice as well as selecting appropriate materials. To represent penguin missiles, the team used modified Estes model rocket engines, enhanced to slow velocity and increase smoke and flame. Rockets were painted to match those seen on the penguin puppets.

Each rocket was attached to its own invisible guide wire leading to a trip switch and explosive charge. The wires were strong and carefully protected from burning by aluminum foil baffles to prevent the rockets from severing their own guides. Rockets had a roughly ten-second burn time and were caught in cylinders with iris trip switches at their targets, preventing them from continuing onward. Explosions combined black powder, gasoline, primer cord, and bullet hits. Some pavilions were rigged with cables and bungees to collapse faster than gravity, and synchronized with explosions to appear realistic when filmed at high speed. For example, the Arachnosphere pavilion was designed with a steel-framed half and an aluminum-framed half; the aluminum side was crushed on cue while the steel side remained intact for quick resetting between takes.

== Vehicles ==
=== Batmobile ===
Live-action shots of the Batmobile utilized the two prototype cars from the original film plus a third one built specifically for the new production. With their curved fiberglass shells built over customized chassis, the prototype cars employed a built-in twelve-volt electrical system to power effects. However, for Batman Returns, Chuck Gaspar and his crew had to extensively retool the original vehicles to get them "up to speed" literally.

The prototypes were in a damaged state and needed significant repairs before they could be used, including replacing the suspension and transmission, tuning up the engine to increase their speed, and rewiring all the additional functions. The Batmobile was going to be on Stage 16 most of the time, so it would not be able to get to required speeds without changing the gear reductions. Although schematics were drawn up as the repairs and improvements progressed, difficulties arose from frequent changes during production and changes made by different teams. For example, one team would replace a wire in a color different from the original, making it hard for others to understand its purpose.

Burton had been unhappy with the flame-exhaust effect of the original Batmobile and wanted to intensify it to resemble a violent jet aircraft engine. For the exhaust flame, a kerosene heating element was used, as well as six jets, inside the rocket motor itself, which atomized the kerosene, which, when ignited, created a red ball of fire coming out the back. During testing, the crew would feed more air into the fire to get a hotter, faster flame. During such testing, it got so hot that the heat transferred to the fiberglass body and scorched the Batmobile. To prevent this, a heat-reducing material was positioned inside and around the engine itself, and then on top of the fiberglass. Ten batteries were installed inside the car to operate the various effects mechanisms. To maximize power, inverters boosted the electric charge to 110 volts; the original Batmobile used only 12 volts.

In one sequence, Batman performs an evasive counter-attack maneuver using a special hydraulic device that drops from beneath the Batmobile chassis and hits the ground to hold the car in place for a 180-degree turn. To enable the Batmobile to turn in place, Gaspar and his crew rigged a pedestal three feet in diameter, hydraulically pushed down from the car's underside, allowing the vehicle to rise. The car was then turned during a cut and dropped back to the ground. For the ensuing burning stunt where the Penguin's henchmen are set on fire by the Batmobile's exhaust, the stuntmen caught on fire from the motor flame using flammable rubber cement on their clown outfits. The stuntmen had Pyrex glass lenses over the top of their masks to allow them to be protected during the full body burn. The sequence ran for 30–45 seconds before the performers' flames were extinguished with CO2.

When the Batmobile is commandeered by the Penguin, it is used to smash through several parked cars that were attached to cables, allowing them to be pulled out of the way. Pacific Data Images removed the cables' appearances on film digitally.

==== Batshield ====
Whereas the first film relied on simple cel animation to realize the protective shield, the sequel featured a sophisticated computer-generated cloaking effect produced by Video Image Associates. Burton had been dissatisfied with the "magical" quality of the animated cloaking effect in the first film, requesting a more reality-based, mechanical look for Batman Returns. Starting with reference photographs of the Batmobile, computer graphics technicians used the Alias software system—an industrial design tool—to model the shield digitally. Animator Joseph Goldstone worked at a monitor rendering the Batmobile shield section by section. A section of shield covering the Batmobile wheel hub employed an irising effect. Video Image Associates generated ten cloaking shots altogether. The completed computer graphics imagery was digitally composited with live-action plates of the Batmobile and then recorded on film.

About ten computer graphics shots were required for the cloaking and uncloaking scenes. As conceived, the cloak was a heavy, high-tension steel shield hidden within the car's body that could expand to cover the vehicle. However, the Batmobile's design did not lend itself to a hidden shield concept. CG artists Joseph Goldstone and Stanley Liu used Alias to design a mechanical-looking cloak that was believable with regard to the shield parts emerging from hidden compartments inside the car. Liu said "We had to deal with the fact that it was physically impossible for a cloak to come out of the Batmobile... we had to invent a lot of new ways for these shield pieces to emerge. We tried to make it look believable and not like the cloak magically comes out of nowhere." In the case of the wheel cover, segments of the iris would otherwise appear to be floating in the air.

To aid the Video Image crew in constructing the cloak digitally, on-set reflection-map photography was taken from the Batmobile's actual viewpoint in all six directions—front, back, left, right, up, and down. A full-scale fiberglass cloak built early in production (used in one live-action shot) also served as reference. Extensive environment mapping and lighting data were gathered, including scanning live-action footage and painting special reflection maps where necessary. The final digital composite was scanned and recorded onto film to complete the ten shots.

==== Batmissile ====
The Batmobile had the capacity to transform into a Batmissile, taking much of the Batmobile action into the visual effects realm. Framed for murder and on the run from police, Batman outmaneuvers his pursuers by transforming the Batmobile into a Batmissile—a near-cylindrical rocket machine. 4-Ward Productions created the effect by shooting various stages of the Batmobile-to-Batmissile conversion in miniature. An initial shot of the car's center sections blowing off and dropping onto the pavement was filmed on a quarter-scale street set, as was a later shot of the Batmissile rounding a corner. Doug Moore and Pat Denver finished painting and detailing the most elaborate of the street models.

Bob Skotak described it as "the kind of gag you'd see in a Road Runner cartoon". The sequence was accomplished in four-perf using quarter-scale Batmobile sections for the specific shots: the cockpit blowing off, side panels narrowing, wheels reconfiguring, and the missile rounding a corner. To maximize set space while maintaining the illusion of speed, a treadmill was used for shots of the Batmissile's front fenders flying off and wheels moving inline. Air pressure and levers simulated the parts detaching, while camera speed was adjusted to give a locked-in-place look at about eight frames per second. Additional touches included camera shakes, mist blowing by sewer grates, and subtle background lighting effects to simulate a realistic environment and vehicle weight.

For the down-angle shot of the Batmobile transforming vertically, 4-Ward created a Gotham street artwork projected onto a front projection screen behind a vertically mounted miniature. The car's parts fell with gravity, creating the illusion of pieces falling behind it. Overhead power lines and light rigs simulated city structures passing between the camera and car, adding realism and helicopter POV camera shake. A more expansive quarter-scale miniature Gotham set was built for the Batmissile rounding a sharp corner, featuring buildings up to twelve feet tall. The missile rode on a single track hidden by a rubber membrane slit that closed behind it. The vehicle leaned exaggeratedly to suggest turning dynamics despite its hot dog shape. The miniature weighed 40–50 pounds and required fine-tuning due to centrifugal forces.

The sequence was originally to end with the Batmissile speeding through a narrow alley and police cars crashing behind, but Burton requested a more dynamic conclusion: the Batmissile rocketing into Gotham's industrial waterfront district. Bob Skotak was given free rein to design and paint a wide vista that tied the industrial waterfront to live-action backlot facades. To film this, the team combined a locked-off miniature of the Batmissile on a wire pulley system with Skotak’s painted waterfront. The road section measured almost 100 feet long and was filmed with the camera turned sideways for a vertical composition. The images were blended side-by-side and projected onto a white screen, with reflection effects added via a "rotating string" gag and blinking city lights. The entire shot was motion-controlled filmed, zooming out as the missile rocketed away.

=== Batskiboat ===
Pursuing the Penguin into the sewers, Batman calls on his Batskiboat: part boat, part jet-ski. To realize the sequence, 4-Ward Productions created a meticulously planned series of miniature shots featuring a Batskiboat model navigating through the sewer system, later used for the baby carriage basket title sequence. Unlike the title sequence, which required close-up tunnel details for the floating carriage's meandering path, the Batskiboat tunnel shots emphasized high-speed action. Bob Skotak said "The boat was a quarter-scale miniature driven on an underwater track... It was pulled along by a chain-link mechanism powered by an air motor turbine-like device driven by air pressure. Air motors have the advantage of fast starts and stops, which was essential." Burton wanted the Batskiboat to appear to be moving at seventy miles per hour in real life, which translated to thirty-five miles per hour when filming at 48 frames per second in scale. Even in the 120-foot tunnel, this meant the shot was brief.

Weighing nearly eighty pounds and measuring five feet long, the Batskiboat was a formidable miniature to propel at speed, especially when racing toward the camera. Cameraman Jim Belkin filmed a wide shot of the boat passing left to right with a 14mm lens, requiring him to quickly pan and move to avoid collision. The precision construction of parallel tracks was critical to ensure smooth, consistent paths for the Batskiboat's rapid travel.

The sequence's most challenging shot involved the "corkscrew" maneuver: as Batman races through the sewer tunnels, two black-foot penguin warriors rise from the murky water to launch missiles at the Batskiboat. Batman swerves up the tunnel wall and back down in a tight corkscrew trajectory to evade impact. For this, the crew engineered parallel tracks embedded into the curved tunnel walls to support the high-speed, gravity-defying motion of the heavy model. Any disruption in a wheel's movement could have caused the track to tear apart, so precision was essential. The track had to mirror the tunnel's curves exactly, with the vehicle's broad wheelbase engineered to handle tight turns and abrupt shifts to level ground.

Two custom-made cable-operated penguin puppets, equipped with remotely launched missiles, were created by Jim Towler for the missile attack shots. The corkscrew tracks were initially considered for digital or optical removal, but Bob Skotak devised an in-camera solution: black tissue paper was painted and sprayed with adhesive to cover the tracks, and razor blades attached to the front wheels sliced open fine slits in the paper as the model passed, rendering the tracks invisible on film.

To heighten realism, the Batskiboat model featured a scaled rocket engine with a flame ribbon lit before each take, powered by a nine-volt battery-driven fan that pushed the flame outward. Achieving atmospheric effects in the tunnel proved difficult: water was stagnant and prone to looking miniature. To counter this, the crew sprayed lacquer onto the water surface to create mottled scum, then added billowing fog introduced through four tunnel openings. The cold water and warm lighting created a natural inversion layer, allowing fog to settle in cloudlike patterns throughout the tunnel, lending an effectively eerie atmosphere.

Due to the numerous interactive elements—fire reflections on water, smoke perspective, missile launches—the sequence was shot almost entirely in-camera, enabling the director to see completed shots immediately without reliance on guesswork as to how it would look postproduction.

The sequence culminates with the Batskiboat bursting through the roof of the Arctic World pavilion. Effects supervisor Mike Fink recalled that two cameras captured this moment from wide and tight angles, enhancing the scene's impact. The model was mounted on a hidden armature pylon and thrust through a breakaway plaster miniature facade of Arctic World, constructed from precut sections backed by balsa wood and detailed on the reverse. Filming occurred at high frame rates—60 to 70 frames per second—capturing the dramatic destruction in slow motion.

Braced for a final confrontation with the Penguin, Batman powers the Batskiboat through the sewer tunnels toward the lair. The extensive quarter-scale tunnel miniature featured an underwater track, one section angled upward to facilitate the breakthrough shot. The 5-foot-long model was propelled by air pressure at speeds up to 35 mph, while carefully directed air streams created realistic water surface waves.

== Reception ==
Welch's production design was generally praised, offering a sleeker, brighter, more authoritarian visual style than Furst's "brooding", oppressive aesthetic. (Note: Attributed to multiple references:) McCarthy described Welch's ability to realize Burton's imaginative universe as an achievement, although Gene Siskel described Welch as a "toy shop window decorator" compared to Furst. The costumes and makeup effects were also praised, with Maslin saying that those images would linger in the imagination long after the narrative was forgotten. Czapsky's cinematography was well-received, even giving a "lively" aesthetic to the subterranean sets. The film's violent, mature, sexual content, such as kidnappings and implied child murder, was criticized as inappropriate for younger audiences. (Note: Attributed to multiple references:)

At the 46th British Academy Film Awards, Batman Returns was nominated for Best Makeup (Ve Neill and Stan Winston) and Best Special Visual Effects (Michael Fink, Craig Barron, John Bruno, and Dennis Skotak). For the 65th Academy Awards, Batman Returns received two nomations: Best Makeup (Neill, Ronnie Specter, and Winston) and Best Visual Effects (Fink, Barron, Bruno, and Skotak). Neill and Winston received the Best Make-up award at the 19th Saturn Awards and was nominated for Best Costume Design (Bob Ringwood, Mary Vogt, and Vin Burnham).

When Matte World Digital closed in 2012, the Academy Museum of Motion Pictures acquired several pieces used to create the world of Batman Returns. Featured in the museum's "Encounters" exhibition were matte paintings of the Batcave and Gotham Park, as well as the miniature model of Cobblepot Manor. The miniature, seen at the beginning of the film, had to be restored by one of its original fabricators, John Goodson, to its original condition. The items were displayed to highlight the film's atmospheric world-building and design.

== Works cited ==
- Cotta Vaz, Mark (August 1992). "A Knight At The Zoo". Cinefex. No. 51. United States. pp. 22–69.
- Fennell, Tim (August 1992). "Schwing!". Empire. London. p. 40.
- Resner, Jeffrey (August 1992). "Three Go Mad in Gotham". Empire. London. pp. 39–46.
- White, Taylor L. (August 1992). "Batman Returns". Cinefantastique. Vol. 23, no. 1. Forest Park, Illinois: Fourth Castle Micromedia. pp. 8–11.
