= MWD =

MWD may refer to:

- Matte World Digital, an American visual effects company
- Measurement while drilling, a procedure used in oil well drilling
- Metropolitan Water District of Southern California, a water wholesale supplier to local cities in Southern California, United States
- Military working dog, used in warfare
- Murakami-Wolf-Dublin, American animation studio
- Myawaddy TV, a Burmese military-owned network
- PAF Base M.M. Alam (IATA code), a Pakistan Air Force airbase located at Mianwali, Pakistan
