= Craig Barron =

American visual effects artist (born 1961)

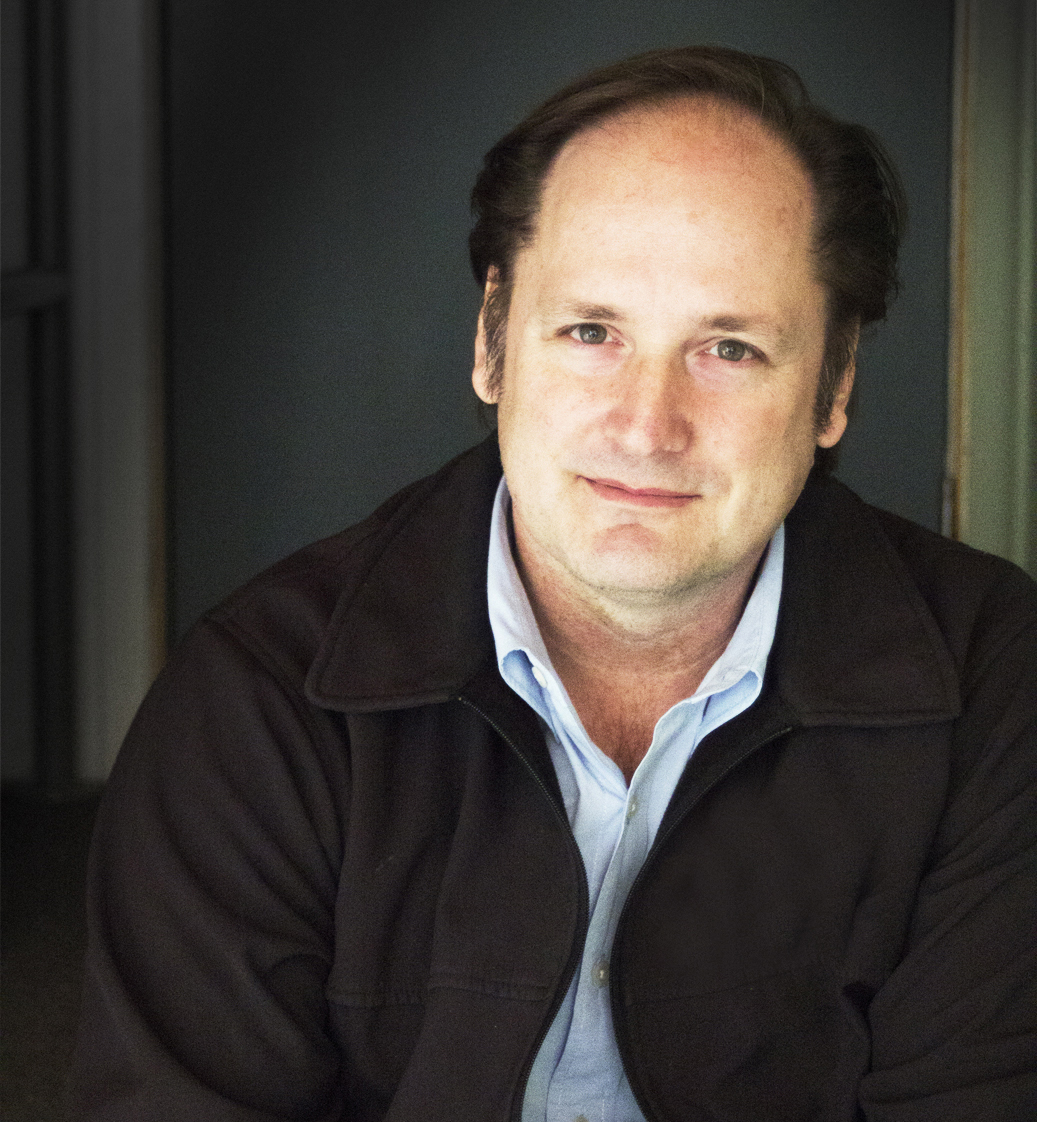
- Born: April 6, 1961 (age 65); Berkeley, California, United States
- Occupations: Executive creative director Visual effects supervisor Film historian Lecturer
- Years active: 1979 – present
- Awards: Academy Award, BAFTA Award, Emmy, VES Founders Award, Doctorate of Letters
- Website: Magnopus

Craig Barron (born April 6, 1961) is executive creative director at media company, Magnopus, after having worked as a visual effects artist for American film and television, specializing in matte painting effects. He produces visual development and virtual production services for motion pictures, television, museums and multimedia platforms.

Starting at Industrial Light & Magic, Barron contributed to the visual effects on films such as The Empire Strikes Back, Raiders of the Lost Ark, and E.T. the Extra-Terrestrial. At his own VFX studio Matte World Digital, he produced visual effects for more than 100 films, including Batman Returns, Casino, and Zodiac. He is an Emmy and Academy Award recipient, film historian, museum curator, archivist and author with a focus on the history of visual effects in classic films, before and after the digital age. His presentations and short documentaries for AMPAS, TCM, and Criterion, reveal the formerly secret history of how visual effects pioneers created seamless visuals using matte paintings, miniatures and optical effects.

== Career ==
=== Visual effects supervisor ===
==== Industrial Light & Magic ====
Hired at age 18 by VFX cinematographer Richard Edlund in 1979, Barron was then the youngest person working at ILM. He originally wanted a job in animation and stop motion, but jumped at the chance to join the matte painting department when there was an opening, working with VFX photographer Neil Krepela while apprenticing with concept illustrator/matte painter Ralph McQuarrie. Eventually Barron was responsible for compositing matte-painted effects for scenes in landmark visual-effects films, including The Empire Strikes Back, Raiders of the Lost Ark, and E.T. the Extra-Terrestrial. Accompanied by matte painters Michael Pangrazio and Chris Evans, at times on international location shoots, Barron and crew designed and photographed matte shots for feature films. From 1984 to 1988 he was matte photography supervisor, working to combine matte paintings and miniatures with live-action photography. He is credited as director of matte photography on Willow (1988), his last film at ILM, before leaving to start his own company Matte World.

==== Matte World Digital ====
Co-founded by Barron, Pangrazio and executive producer Krystyna Demkowicz in 1988, Matte World produced seamless matte-painting effects for film and television productions from its Novato, California studio. Soon after formation, Barron's work for HBO's By Dawn's Early Light won an Emmy for Outstanding Visual Effects. Throughout the 1980s, Barron and his crew produced traditional effects shots with glass matte paintings and miniature models. Their work received an Academy Award nomination for Best Visual Effects for Batman Returns in 1992.

That same year, the company was renamed Matte World Digital (MWD) to reflect the new technological tools available to matte painters. MWD produced digital environments for feature films, commercials, cable television, computer games and IMAX projects, serving the artistic visions of directors Martin Scorsese, Francis Ford Coppola, James Cameron, Alfonso Cuaron, Gore Verbinski, Ron Howard, Tim Burton, David Fincher, Leonard Nimoy, and Frank Darabont, among others. Barron contributed to the visual effects of more than 100 films at MWD, innovating digital-effects techniques for Zodiac, Alice in Wonderland, and The Curious Case of Benjamin Button, which won the Academy Award for Best Visual Effects in 2009. MWD closed in 2012 after 24 years of service. The company's last project was creating stereo CGI matte paintings of 1930s-era Paris and Georges Méliès' glass studio for Martin Scorsese's Hugo.

==== Innovations ====
According to Barron, Matte World Digital was a small enough company that could "integrate new ideas into our pipeline very quickly." The company took advantage of new rendering techniques and built custom tools geared toward innovative matte shots. MWD was the first company to apply radiosity rendering to film, for Martin Scorsese's Casino. Collaborating with software company LightScape, the MWD crew was able to simulate the reflective effect of millions of neon lights from the 1970s-era Las Vegas strip. Radiosity rendering provided a true simulation of bounce-light reflectivity in a computer-generated environment.

For David Fincher's Zodiac, another film mainly set in the 1970s, shots were needed to establish the grittier San Francisco of that era. Barron shot digital images of existing city-building textures, then added painted period details in the computer. One such shot features the Embarcadero Freeway alongside the Ferry Building and San Francisco Bay. The freeway had been demolished after the 1989 Loma Prieta earthquake so MWD digitally rebuilt the structure, viewed from an overhead computer-generated "helicopter-shot" to introduce San Francisco in 1969. For another overhead shot following a taxi cab at night, Fincher wanted the digital camera to make a tight rotation around a corner to build tension, something a helicopter could not have done. MWD used A Digital Domain-provided taxi in motion, lit miniature cars as photo elements, and overhead digital bluescreen footage of walking MWD employees for a hybrid approach to the final shot. CG lighting techniques using a real-sky background were applied for a stylized "time-lapse" animated sequence showing the Transamerica Pyramid being built, establishing the passage of time. Barron researched archival photographs and architectural drawings for the shot.

Barron worked with Fincher again in 2008 to build several digital matte and CGI environments for The Curious Case of Benjamin Button. The interior of the film's New Orleans train station had to change and deteriorate, representing different eras. MWD built the CGI station interiors using Next Limit's Maxwell rendering software—software that was generally used as an architectural visualization and product-design tool. MWD revamped it to mimic real-world lighting as seen from multiple angles and light sources.

==== Other visual effects work ====
While heading Matte World Digital, Barron co-produced and directed the science-fiction short, The Utilizer, broadcast on Syfy (then called the Sci-Fi Channel) in 1996. The film won the best special effects award at the Chicago International Film Festival.

Barron was a visual effects supervisor at Tippett Studio in 2013, where he developed digital environments for film and commercial productions alongside his former ILM co-worker Phil Tippett.

=== Film historian ===
==== Author ====
Growing up watching classic films, Barron was inspired by and curious about how special effects were created. Studying movie end credits, he made a roster of VFX directors and crews which he sought out and interviewed. These mostly retired camera operators and matte painters revealed the formerly secretive world of visual effects techniques in films such as King Kong, The Wizard of Oz, and Citizen Kane. This oral history of movie-making, along with a growing collection of behind-the-scenes photographs, were the basis of Barron's book, The Invisible Art: The Legends of Movie Matte Painting. The Invisible Art..., co-wrriten with Mark Cotta Vaz, is the first comprehensive book on the history of matte painting and its transition into the digital age. The New York Times called it "Eye-opening…increas[ing] our wonder at this heretofore 'invisible art.'"

==== Educator ====
As a public-programs lecturer for the Academy of Motion Picture Arts and Sciences (AMPAS), Barron presents public screenings showcasing the art and technique of visual effects in classic studio films, often partnering with friend and fellow effects artist, sound designer Ben Burtt. The duo have been continuing guest hosts for Turner Classic Movies and Barron has been an ongoing contributor to the annual TCM Classic Film Festival in Hollywood since 2014. For their presentations, Barron and Burtt rely on extensive research and digital recreations to discover and uncover the hidden history of a century of film production. When preparing for a screening of Gunga Din, they visited the Lone Pine, California Alabama Hills location where the film was shot in 1938, and found pieces of the set buried there. Using camera drones, they then recreated the film's locations as CGI environments.

Barron has been an adjunct associate professor at the USC School of Cinematic Arts since 2015. His "World of Visual Effects" course focuses on the history of visual effects in film and how visual effects have influenced narratives in filmmaking from its inception to today.

Selected presentations Presentations and screenings co-hosted by Barron and Burtt unless otherwise noted.

- Techno Chaplin – Modern Times with John Bengstson – Behind-the-scenes photos and multimedia tour explaining how Chaplin used mattes, process shots, miniatures and rear projection within industrial settings of 1930s Los Angeles. 2008, Hollywood/San Rafael, CA.
- The Adventures of Robin Hood – Featured matte paintings and sound design with recreation of archery tests from the film. 2012, New York, NY.
- The War of the Worlds – Demonstration of producer George Pal's Oscar-winning visual effects for TCM Classic Film Festival 2016, Hollywood, CA.
- Visual Effects Techniques in Silent Cinema - Dennis Memorial Lecture Presentation by Barron at the Pordenone Silent Film Festival on the seamless visual effects in the films of Méliès, Chaplin and Murnau, and Barron's work recreating Méliès's studio for Martin Scorsese's Hugo (2011).
- Colossus: The Forbin Project - Screening and discussion with lead actor Eric Braeden about the making of the film and the rise in the use of AI in science fiction filmmaking for TCM Classic Film Festival 2025, Hollywood, CA.
- Craig Barron presents The Rains Came in 35mm - How the monsoon, earthquake and flood sequences were created for the first film to win an Academy Award for Best Visual Effects.
- Playing with Fire: The Making of The Towering Inferno explores the contributions of the Human Torch stunt team, as well as the miniature building and fire effects photographed by visual effects supervisor Bill Abbott.

==== Documentarian ====
Barron produces and is featured in a number of documentary supplements for DVD and Blu-ray editions from The Criterion Collection and TCM. The documentary shorts, often in conjunction with Burtt, explain with interviews, animated sequences and reenactments, how 3D visual effects were made in classic Hollywood films, such as Citizen Kane, It's a Wonderful Life, The Circus and The Incredible Shrinking Man.

Selected documentary filmography

- Modern Times (1936) / A Bucket of Water and a Glass Matte (2010) – Barron and Burtt demonstrate Chaplin's use of miniatures and sound effects in the film's factory and roller-skating scenes.
- Rebecca (1940) / Constructing the Eerie World of Rebecca (2017) – Barron demonstrates the large-scale Manderlay miniature that Hitchcock's crew built and filmed onset, which included a miniature car and destruction by fire.
- Bringing Up Baby (1938), But What About My Leopard? The Magic of Optical Effects Pioneer Linwood Dunn – Interview with Linwood Dunn and demonstration on how a live leopard was safely shot on set with actors.

Barron and Burtt write and produce the documentary series Secrets of the Hollywood Archives, a series that premiered on The Criterion Channel in 2022. Each five-minute episode focuses on one scene of a classic Hollywood film to demonstrate how studio VFX departments created its visual effects. In such films as Action in the North Atlantic, 12 O'Clock High, and Forbidden Planet, the producers dig through outtakes that were never released to the public, as well as production clips, stock shots and sound-effect recordings to find buried historical documentation of visual-effects history and techniques.

The series, now called Secrets of the Hollywood Archive moved to Turner Classic Movies in 2025, with two new episodes — "Hollywood and Vines," exploring the making of MGM's Tarzan film series, with behind-the-scenes insights from film history scholars and archival researchers, and "Mattes, Bows & Blades," examining the production of The Adventures of Robin Hood, with a focus on how the film's iconic sword fights were choreographed and staged.

==== Museum development and visual effects advisor ====
Barron served on the planning committees tasked with developing the Academy Museum of Motion Pictures, a process that began in 2007. For the Museum's inaugural exhibit on Citizen Kane, he co-produced videos honoring effects master Linwood Dunn and his use of mattes, miniatures and the optical printer to create Kane's iconic visuals. Painted mattes and the Wayne Manor model for Batman Returns from the Matte World Digital archive were on display at the Academy Museum's inaugural opening in 2021.

=== Executive creative director ===
Barron joined Magnopus, a media company based in Los Angeles, in 2014. As a creative director and as of 2020, executive creative director, Barron specializes in virtual production, CGI and AI environment creation, and direction of interactive and immersive virtual-reality experiences for motion pictures and television, as well as remote educational experiences with augmented and virtual-reality for museums and other multimedia platforms.

==== Magnopus productions ====
Barron directed the VR tie-in to 2017's Blade Runner 2049. Entitled Blade Runner 2049: Memory Lab, the 30-minute VR production is set in the world of the film where users act as replicant android hunters. A review in UploadVR said the experience, "...manages to contribute somewhat to 2049's story without stepping on it, shedding more light on one of the film's central characters that gives the entire piece an even deeper sense of purpose." Memory Lab was nominated for an Emmy for Outstanding Original Interactive Program in 2018.

In partnership with Television City and Holocaust Museum LA, Barron wrote and directed a virtual museum experience app that brings Holocaust Museum LA's educational exhibits to global audiences. The Sobibor AR Exhibit uses augmented reality and holographic capture technology to help educators and students explore an animated 3D model of the Sobibor Death Camp with detailed historical information. Users can generate a virtual representation of the camp on their desktop, based on an original model by Holocaust survivor Thomas Blatt, while being guided through the experience by actor Ben Feldman, who appears as a holographic virtual guide to provide historical context and narration. The app has reached over 150,000 students through an educational program that provides teachers with detailed curriculum guides for classroom integration. The project was recognized as a Collision Awards finalist in the XR - Education & Training category for its innovative approach to Holocaust education, demonstrating how emerging technologies can make historical testimony more accessible and engaging for students.

As Virtual Art Department (VAD) Supervisor, Barron oversaw the creation of virtual backgrounds for Remembering, a short film produced by and starring Brie Larson and directed by Elijah Allan-Blitz for Walt Disney Studios' StudioLab in 2022. Shot on Nant Studios' LED stage, the project also included an interactive app for Disney+ that breaks the fourth wall by extending the film's magical worlds into viewers' living rooms. The app allows viewers to pre-scan their living room and then integrates 3D elements like waterfalls, forests, and dolphins, transforming their home environment.

Virtual Art Department (VAD) Supervisor, Barron led the design and creation of background environments for the 2024 Amazon Prime series, Fallout. His work on the LED virtual production stage helped to establish the show's dystopian world, providing the production with a real-time, final-pixel interactive backgrounds that seamlessly blended digital and practical sets.

Barron conducted in-depth visual research into studio archives for The Wizard of Oz at Sphere, generating training data that helped create faithful representations of characters and enhanced environments with artist-assisted AI at Las Vegas' Sphere venue. Collaborating with VFX artist Ben Grossmann and the Google AI team, he supervised animatics and contributed to AI outpainted environment extensions that adapted the 4:3 aspect ratio to the Sphere's curved 160,000-square-foot display. Barron oversaw elements such as the enhanced Emerald City, Witch's castle, and other Oz environments while preserving the authentic visual language of 1930s film production.

In collaboration with the Academy Museum of Motion Pictures, Barron wrote and directed a mixed-reality experience for the museum's 2024–26 exhibition, Cyberpunk: Envisioning Possible Futures Through Cinema. Located in the museum's lobby, the immersive piece allows guests wearing AR headsets to be led by actor Rosa Salazar and director Ridley Scott through the evolution of virtual production. The experience demonstrates how virtual sets are built, inspired by films like Blade Runner, showcasing the future of virtual world-building and filmmaking.

== Awards, honors and affiliations ==
=== Awards and nominations ===
- By Dawn's Early Light – Emmy for Outstanding Visual Effects, 1990
- Batman Returns – Academy and BAFTA Award nominations for Achievement in Visual Effects, 1992
- The Utilizer – Gold Plaque for Best Special Effects, Chicago International Film Festival, 1996
- The Truman Show – BAFTA Award nomination for Achievement in Special Visual Effects, 1999
- The Invisible Art: The Legends of Movie Matte Painting, with Mark Cotta Vaz – Theatre Library Association of New York Outstanding Book on Film Award, 2003; Theatre Technology Golden Pen Book Award, 2004
- Greece: Secrets of the Past – Visual Effects Society (VES) Award nomination for Outstanding Visual Effects in a special venue project, 2006
- Zodiac – VES Award nomination for Outstanding Visual Effects in a Motion Picture, 2007
- The Curious Case of Benjamin Button – Academy and BAFTA Awards for Achievement in Visual Effects, 2009
- VES Founders Award, 2013
- Blade Runner 2049: Memory Lab – Emmy nomination for Outstanding Original Interactive Program, 2018, Clio Entertainment Bronze Winner for Virtual/Augmented Reality, 2018
- VES Fellows Award, 2018
- Holocaust Museum LA: Augmented Reality Education App - Collision Awards finalist for XR - Education & Training, 2024

=== Honors and affiliations ===
- Honorary Doctorate of Letters, PhD, Academy of Art University, San Francisco, 1979
- Associate member of the American Society of Cinematographers
- Founding member of the Visual Effects Society, 1997
- Academy of Motion Picture Arts and Sciences, Board of Governors representing the Visual Effects Branch, 2005-2022
- Co-chair of the AMPAS Science & Technology Council, 2014-2022

== Selected filmography ==
- Hugo, 2011
- Captain America: The First Avenger, 2011
- Alice in Wonderland, 2010
- Terminator Salvation, 2009
- The Curious Case of Benjamin Button, 2008
- The Golden Compass, 2007
- Zodiac, 2007
- Invincible, 2006
- The Alamo, 2004
- Down With Love, 2003
- The Ring, 2002
- The Green Mile, 1999
- The Truman Show, 1998
- Titanic, 1997
- Star Trek: First Contact, 1996
- Independence Day, 1996
- Casino, 1995
- Clear and Present Danger, 1994
- Hocus Pocus, 1993
- Bram Stoker's Dracula, 1992
- Batman Returns, 1992
- Terminator 2: Judgment Day, 1991
- Star Trek VI: The Undiscovered Country, 1991
- Gremlins 2: The New Batch, 1990
- By Dawn's Early Light (television), 1990
- Willow, 1988
- Star Trek IV: The Voyage Home, 1986
- Labyrinth, 1986
- The Goonies, 1985
- Indiana Jones and the Temple of Doom, 1984
- The NeverEnding Story, 1984
- Star Trek III: The Search for Spock, 1984
- Starman, 1984
- Return of the Jedi, 1983
- Poltergeist, 1982
- Star Trek II: The Wrath of Khan, 1982
- E.T. the Extra-Terrestrial, 1982
- Raiders of the Lost Ark, 1981
- The Empire Strikes Back, 1980

== Publications ==
- Barron, Craig and Cotta Vaz, Mark (2002). The Invisible Art: The Legends of Movie Matte Painting. San Francisco: Chronicle Books. ISBN 0-8118-4515-X.
- Barron, Craig (July 23, 1998). Matte Painting in the Digital Age. "Invisible Effects" series transcript. Orlando, FL: SIGGRAPH 98.
