= Trinity's Child =

1983 novel by William Prochnau

- First edition
- Author: William Prochnau
- Language: English
- Publisher: Putnam Pub Group
- Publication date: October 1983
- Pages: 400 (Hardcover)
- ISBN: 978-0-399-12777-9

Trinity's Child is a 1983 fiction novel written by William Prochnau. The book narrates a nuclear war between the United States and the Soviet Union.

The story takes place during the waning years of the Cold War when the US engages in a massive military buildup against the Soviet Union to push the Soviet economy to a breaking point, with the aim of bringing it to a political compromise favoring the US.

== Plot ==
The US president is informed by the head of SAC that a Soviet first strike is underway. The Soviet premier offers the United States three choices via a HOTLINE message:

1. Accept the damage, ending the exchange.
2. Respond in kind, leading to the deaths of 3 to 9 million people on both sides, but similarly ending the exchange.
3. Respond with a massive counterattack.

As the order to respond in kind is passed on, the first wave of Soviet ICBMs and SLBMs strike and cripple most of America's ICBM missile silos and bomber bases. As a Soviet missile strikes near Chevy Chase, Maryland, and the President is informed of a second Soviet strike. The president reluctantly gives a second order to respond in kind just before SAC and Omaha, Nebraska, are destroyed. As he is evacuated from the White House, the president is briefed that the second launch was directed at the Chinese, therefore a second response was unnecessary. During the flight a nearby detonation causes Marine One to crash.

Believing the president to be dead, a US Navy admiral code-named "Harpoon" is given the assignment of locating a successor, who turns out to be the US Secretary of the Interior. He is sworn in and given the code-name "Condor." Harpoon's Boeing E-4B becomes the American military's new command center. It is revealed that Baton Rouge, Seattle, Los Angeles, Colorado Springs, New Orleans, Phoenix, Raleigh, Honolulu and part of Washington, DC, have also been destroyed, and massive looting and panic has broken out in the remaining cities and towns across the country.

Harpoon urges Condor to turn the bombers around to see if the Soviets respond in kind as a way of signaling an intent to de-escalate, since communications are down and direct talks have not been possible since the explosions. Colonel Fargo, a Soviet capabilities expert, suggests a decapitation strike targeting Soviet leadership bunkers with America's nuclear submarines. Believing that the US is "losing" the war, Condor orders the decapitation strike. One of the few surviving SAC B-52 bombers headed to the Soviet Union, call sign "Polar Bear One," refuses the E-4B's orders and turns around. Seeing that as a sign for a truce, the Soviets turn 15 of their bombers around. Condor is urged by "Alice," who is now in charge of SAC aboard the Looking Glass Plane, an airborne command and control center under US nuclear forces to turn around another squadron of B-52 bombers in response, but Condor refuses.

It is then revealed that the president survived the crash of Marine One, and is still alive in a FEMA bunker outside Olney, Maryland. He learns that the Soviet premier is attempting to make contact through shortwave radio. Both negotiate a ceasefire. The president then contacts Alice, whom he orders to turn the bombers around. Alice, an Air Force general, cannot issue direct orders to the Navy, and the President's identity codes conflict with Condor's. The president contacts Condor to urge him to help secure a ceasefire, but Condor, believing he is a Soviet imposter, refuses. Alice tells the president that if both he and Condor give the submarines two different sets of orders, the submarines will go with the original orders (Condor's orders to launch a strike). The president and Alice attempt to create a plan to stop Condor. Alice suggests using the Looking Glass as a weapon to intercept the E-4B to kill Condor and to relinquish authority to the president.

Alice attempts to catch up to Condor during a seven-hour window until the submarines surface to listen for new orders, which is when Condor will give the order for the decapitation strike. With minutes left, the flight crew of the E-4B, who are loyal to Alice, turn the plane into the path of the Looking Glass and kill everyone on board both planes. Command is returned to the president, who orders a full cessation of hostilities. The Soviet Union responds in kind.

== Television adaptation ==
The book was made into a 1990 television movie, By Dawn's Early Light. There are some significant differences, including that the film has the initial nuclear exchange prompted by renegade Soviet terrorists launching a short-range nuclear missile from near Turkey, targeting Ukraine, rather than being part of a Soviet plot.
