= William Prochnau =

American journalist

William Walter Prochnau (August 9, 1937 – March 28, 2018) was an American journalist. In 1996 he began working for Vanity Fair as a contributing editor.

== Career ==
Prochnau was born in Everett, Washington. His father died when he was eight, and his mother became a nurse to support her family. He attended Everett Community College and Seattle University. Before working for Vanity Fair, Prochnau was the Washington-bureau chief for The Seattle Times and he later served as a national affairs reporter for The Washington Post. He reported from Southeast Asia and Vietnam, making two tours of Vietnam in 1965 and 1967. Prochnau wrote articles which include the profile of Pat Robertson and a report on the kidnapping of multinational businessmen held for ransom. His work on the Vietnam War while at the Seattle Times landed him on the infamous master list of Nixon political opponents.

== Works ==
External videos
- Booknotes interview with Prochnau on Once Upon a Distant War, January 14, 1996, C-SPAN

Prochnau had two movies created from the works he wrote.: His Vanity Fair article "Adventures in the Ransom Trade" inspired the 2000 film Proof of Life. His novel Trinity's Child was the basis for 1990's By Dawn's Early Light.

He also wrote Once Upon a Distant War: David Halberstam, Neil Sheehan, Peter Arnett--Young War Correspondents and Their Early Vietnam Battles, about the experiences of Halberstam, Sheehan, and Arnett reporting from Vietnam. On Halberstam's recommendation, he would later become a writer for Vanity Fair.

== Awards and honors ==
Prochnau won an Alicia Patterson Journalism Fellowship in 1988 to research and write about the media as it operated in the Vietnam War and its aftermath.

== Personal life ==
Prochnau was married twice. His first marriage produced four children but ended in divorce. Prochnau's second marriage was to Laura Parker. Together they wrote articles for Vanity Fair. They resided in Washington, DC. Laura Parker also covers aviation for The Washington Post and served as a national correspondent for USA Today for ten years.
