= Harold Weed =

American visual and special effects artist

Howie Weed
- Born: Harold S. Weed; December 23, 1962 (age 63); San Francisco, California
- Occupation: Visual/special effects artist
- Known for: Special effects artist

Harold "Howie" S. Weed (born December 23, 1962) is an American visual and special effects artist known for his work on Hollywood films and franchises. His most notable works have been Star Wars: Episode V The Empire Strikes Back, Star Trek, and Pirates of the Caribbean: The Curse of the Black Pearl. Weed started his career in films in the 1980s with an uncredited model making job for the film Gremlins.

== Star Wars ==
Weed has gained a cult following for his involvement with the Star Wars Universe. Weed works with George Lucas' company Industrial Light and Magic and has appeared in Episode IV as multiple characters and worked on multiple Star Wars films behind the scenes with his special effects work.

In the 1997 Special Edition re-release of Star Wars: A New Hope, Weed played Ketwol, a character created with a costume and mechanical stilts.

Also in the re-release, Weed appeared as the Wampa, replacing actor Des Webb, and then as character Melas.

Weed worked on Star Wars: Episode I The Phantom Menace as a digital model development and construction artist and then Star Wars: Episode III Revenge of the Sith as a digital modeler.

Weed has been interviewed for the Star Wars: Insider magazine and Jedi News.

== In literature ==
Weed appears in:

- 17th International Conference on Computer Graphics and Interactive Techniques
- Cinefex issues 69-72
- Dracula in Visual Media: Film, Television, Comic Book and Electronic Game Appearances, 1921-2010 by John Edgar Browning
- The Encyclopedia of Fantastic Film: Ali Baba to Zombies by R.G. Young
- Star Wars: The Making of Episode I, The Phantom Menace by Laurent Bouzereau and Jody Duncan

== Filmography ==
Year	Film	Credit
2014	Transformers: Age of Extinction	Digital Artist
2013	Pacific Rim	Digital artist
2013	G.I. Joe: Retaliation	Senior digital artist
2012	Battleship	Digital artist
2011	Cowboys & Aliens	Digital artist
2011	Super 8	Digital artist
2011	I Am Number Four	Digital artist
2009	Star Trek	Digital models and simultaneous
2008	Indiana Jones and the Kingdom of the Crystal Skull	Digital modeler and simulator
2007	Transformers	Character modeler
2007	Pirates of the Caribbean: At World's End	Technical director: Light
2006	Eragon	Digital modeler
2006	Pirates of the Caribbean: Dead Man's Chest	Digital modeler
2006	Poseidon	Computer graphics modeler
2005	War of the Worlds	Modeler and texture artist
2005	Star Wars: Episode III – Revenge of the Sith	Digital Modeler
2005	xXx: State of the Union	Digital artist
2005	The Island	Digital models
2003	Terminator 3: Rise of the Machines	Digital modeler
2003	Pirates of the Caribbean: The Curse of the Black Pearl	Digital modeler
2003	Dreamcatcher	Digital modeler
2002	Minority Report	Digital modeler
2002	The Time Machine	Lead digital modeler
2001	A.I. Artificial Intelligence	Digital model development
1999	Star Wars: Episode I – The Phantom Menace	Digital model development & construction artist
1997	Men in Black	Model maker: saucer crash miniature & blue screen unit
1997	The Lost World: Jurassic Park	Digital effects artist
1996	Dragonheart	Sculptor
1995	Congo	Chief model maker: miniatures unit
1994	Star Trek Generations	Model maker
1994	The Flintstones	Model maker
1993	Fire in the Sky	Creature technician
1991	Star Trek VI: The Undiscovered Country	Model maker
1991	Naked Lunch	Anamatonics technician
1990	Bird on a Wire	CWI special makeup effects
1990	Look Who's Talking Too	Animatronics
1990	Arachnophobia	Animatronic engineer (creature effects)
1990	RoboCop 2	Chris Walas Inc crew member
1989	Ghostbusters II	Character performer
1988	The Blob	Designer
1987	The Witches of Eastwick	Creature construction
1986	Nutcracker: The Motion Picture	Sculptor
1986	House	Creature effects
1986	The Fly	Fly creature effects
1985	Enemy Mine	Special creature effects technician
1984	Gremlins	Creature crew
1980/1997	Star Wars: Episode V - The Empire Strikes Back Special Edition	Chief creature maker

Incomplete lists of Weed's visual effects works appear on the websites Hollywood.com and the New York Times.
