= Michael Pangrazio =

American painter

- Born: Michael Pangrazio; 20th century California, U.S.
- Notable work: paintings for films Raiders of the Lost Ark and The Empire Strikes Back
- Movement: Realism

Michael Pangrazio (born 20th century), commonly credited as Mike Pangrazio, is an American art director in the feature-film industry, known for his matte-painting work on 1981 Raiders of the Lost Ark (1981) and The Empire Strikes Back (1980).

As a traditional and digital matte artist, he has created some of the most famous matte paintings in movie history. His best known painting is the Raiders of the Lost Ark warehouse interior set-extension at the end of the movie.

== Career ==
After graduating high school, Pangrazio worked as scenic artist for a television network, which was a euphemistic term for "bucket boy", as he was charged with cleaning paint buckets, dirty brushes and other menial tasks.

He subsequently performed these tasks for a small Hollywood effects studio, before he met Joe Johnston of Industrial Light & Magic (ILM). Through Johnson, Pangrazio was hired in 1978 at ILM. Lacking any experience, conceptual artist and matte painter Ralph McQuarrie taught him the craft of matte painting, a trade he learned in the course of three years.

The backdrops from most of the stop-motion shots from the Imperial Walker/Hoth sequence from The Empire Strikes Back were painted by Pangrazio. The final shot of the government warehouse from Raiders of the Lost Ark, which was painted on glass by Pangrazio at ILM, was combined with live-action footage of a government worker pushing the crate up the center aisle. The integration of the live-action lighting and painted lighting effects is said to be the best matte-painting achievement in filmmaking history. He was also responsible for the Indiana Jones and the Temple of Doom (1984) Pankot Palace, Cliff and the Village, as well as most Young Sherlock Holmes (1985) matte paintings.

After leaving ILM, Pangrazio co-founded Matte World Digital with Craig Barron in 1988. Barron and Pangrazio continued to work with the crew at ILM on notable matte-painting scenes in several classic feature films.

Pangrazio moved to Oregon with his family in 1994 to pursue his children's book illustration career. He contributed images to numerous book publications.

In 2004, Pangrazio returned to the film industry and joined a world-leading visual effects studio Weta Digital in New Zealand as art director. He has since supervised blockbuster installments, including The Hobbit: An Unexpected Journey (2012) and Bridge to Terabithia (2007).

== Personal life ==
Pangrazio is single and has had two children, Nathanael Pangrazio and Natalee Pangrazio. The father of his former wife, Lynda, was writer and speaker Jim Rohn.

== Publications ==
- Once Upon a Time: Treasury of Modern Fairy Tales
- Glim the Glorious, Or, How the Little Folk Bested the Gubgoblins

== Awards and nominations ==
- Primetime Emmy Award for Outstanding Special Visual Effects for By Dawn's Early Light in 1990.

== Achievements ==
- Star Wars (1977) – the tractor-beam set
- Raiders of the Lost Ark (1981) – the final shot of the government warehouse was painted on glass by Michael Pangrazio at Industrial Light and Magic, and combined with live-action footage of a government worker pushing the crate up the center aisle
- Indiana Jones and the Temple of Doom (1984) – Pankot Palace, Cliff, The Village (The Raider.Net article about the matte paintings)
- Young Sherlock Holmes (1985) – the first digital matte shot was created by Pangrazio and Christopher Leith Evans; a stained-glass window was painted in acrylics then scanned into LucasFilm's Pixar computer system for digital manipulation; the animated Stained-Glass Knight character, the first digitally created character in a motion picture, blended seamlessly with the window
