= Cinefex =

Film journal

- Categories: Cinema, Visual Effects, Science Fiction film
- Frequency: Quarterly (1980–2016); Bimonthly (2016–2021)
- Paid circulation: 32,000 (1999)
- Founder: Don Shay
- First issue: March 1980
- Final issue Number: 172
- Country: United States
- Based in: Riverdale
- Language: English
- Website: www.cinefex.com
- ISSN: 0198-1056

Cinefex /ˈsɪnɪfɛks/ was a quarterly journal that debuted in 1980 and covered visual effects in cinema, with a particular focus on science-fiction films. Each issue featured lengthy, detailed articles that described the creative and technical processes behind current films, the information drawn from interviews with the effects artists and technicians involved. Each issue also featured many behind-the-scenes photographs illustrating the progression of visual effects shots – from previsualization to final – as well as the execution of miniatures, pyrotechnics, makeup and other related effects.

A defining characteristic of Cinefex is its unusual 8 in (20 cm) by 9 in (23 cm) configuration, a format Shay chose to enable him to reproduce film frames in a format similar to their original film aspect ratio.

== Publication history ==
The magazine was founded by Don Shay, who alone wrote and produced the first issue, released in March 1980, which covered the effects work in the films Alien and Star Trek: The Motion Picture. Earlier, Shay had written extensively on the stop-motion effects work in the original 1933 film King Kong, published in the British publication Focus on Film, and had authored a definitive piece on the effects in Close Encounters of the Third Kind for the magazine Cinefantastique. Shay had also published five issues of an earlier fantasy film magazine from 1962 to 1967, titled K'scope (for Kaleidoscope, which appeared on the cover of the first issue), as well as collaborating with Ray Cabana on the one-shot magazine Candlelight Room in 1963.

In 2004, Don Shay received the Board of Directors Award from the Visual Effects Society for "illuminating the field of visual effects through his role as publisher of Cinefex." He was made a lifetime member of the VES in 2016.

In 2014, Don Shay retired as publisher, handing the reins to his son Gregg Shay, who took over ownership in 2015.

=== History ===
The magazine was entirely reader-supported for its first ten years. In 1990, advertising director Bill Lindsay launched an advertising program that enabled Shay to hire editor Jody Duncan, the publication's head writer for several years. In January 2001, associate editor Joe Fordham, who previously wrote for VFXPro, joined the staff. He had previously written a freelance article in Issue 77 (1999).

In July 1999, Cinefex launched a website, with selected online featurettes meant to complement the print publication. In 2009, it began publishing a digital version of its print edition online, that was otherwise identical to the printed version.Beginning with Issue 127 (October 2011), Cinefex was made available digitally for the iPad, featuring enhanced features such as embedded video and before and after comparisons of visual effects shots. Gradually, back issues of the magazine were also converted into digital copies, available for purchase in the app.

In October 2013, Graham Edwards joined as a writer for the Cinefex blog, later transiting to become an author for the main publication. Edwards had previously written in 2011 a retrospective review of the first 40 issues of Cinefex that got the attention of publisher Don Shay.

A 2014 event presented by the Visual Effects Society and held at UCLA celebrated "35 Years of Cinefex" and featured a panel discussion with Don Shay and Jody Duncan, moderated by Matte World Digital founder Craig Barron. The event highlighted the magazine's definitive coverage of the most explosive and innovative era in visual effects history, a period that saw the early use of motion control technology in The Empire Strikes Back, the development of computer animation (showcased in the groundbreaking 1993 film Jurassic Park), the pinnacle of performance capture techniques, as executed in 2009's Avatar, as well as advancements in hydraulics and robotics employed in practical, in-camera effects.

In late 2015, as the quarterly magazine transitioned into bimonthly publication, Cinefex blog editor Graham Edwards joined the team as a full-time writer.

Cinefex expanded from quarterly to bimonthly publication beginning in 2016.

In its February 2021 issue, #172, Cinefex announced its final issue of the magazine after 40 years of publications. Gregg Shay, the magazine's publisher, cited the effects of COVID-19 pandemic as a reason for the magazine to officially end and discontinue its publication.

== Reception ==
In 2001, twenty years after the original publication of Cinefex, Ramin Zahed of Variety praised the magazine, writing that it is "one of the top chroniclers of the advancements in the visual effects industry over the past 20 years" and "one of the few places where you can turn to when you're desperate for the right information about special effects credits." In The Empire of Effects, author Julie A. Turnock writes "Cinefex has played an important role to those hoping to join the effects industry as well as to scholars who are writing about it." while noting that, like other industry publications, Cinefex relied on access by studios and producers, and would thus "present the effects production in idealized form". Turnock describes Cinefex as a "fan-directed effects and science fiction–oriented publication". In a 1999 interview, Don Shay states "We took the position early on that it was more important to be accurate than to maintain the customary sense of journalistic detachment" regarding the Cinefex policy to allow interview subjects to proofread and make corrections prior to the publication of an article.

== See also ==
- List of film periodicals
- Cinefantastique
- Starlog
