= By Dawn's Early Light =

1990 American television film directed by Jack Sholder

- Film poster
- Genre: Action; Drama; Thriller
- Based on: Trinity's Child by William Prochnau
- Teleplay by: Bruce Gilbert
- Directed by: Jack Sholder
- Starring: Powers Boothe; Rebecca De Mornay; James Earl Jones; Martin Landau; Rip Torn; Jeffrey DeMunn; Darren McGavin; Ken Jenkins
- Music by: Trevor Jones; Paul Hulme
- Country of origin: United States
- Original language: English

Production
- Executive producer: Bruce Gilbert
- Producer: Thomas M. Hammel
- Production location: Santa Clarita, California
- Cinematography: Alexander Gruszynski
- Editor: Tony Lombardo
- Running time: 100 minutes
- Production companies: Paravision International; HBO Pictures

Original release
- Network: HBO
- Release: May 19, 1990

By Dawn's Early Light is an HBO original movie, first aired in 1990. It is based on the 1983 novel Trinity's Child, written by William Prochnau.

== Plot ==
In 1991, dissident officials in the Soviet Union launch a nuclear missile at Donetsk from a site in NATO member Turkey. Soviet automated defense systems, believing that a NATO attack is in progress, execute a measured launch of intercontinental ballistic missiles (ICBMs) at the United States. After Donetsk is destroyed, Strategic Air Command (SAC) scrambles its forces and SAC Commander General Renning urges the President to authorize a large-scale counterattack. The Soviet leader explains the dissidents' actions to the President. He asks the United States to stand down, citing the two nations' improving relations, but is willing to accept a US counterstrike comparable to the Soviet strike, costing each side six to nine million people. If the US launches an all-out attack, however, the Soviets will respond in kind.

As the President argues with General Renning, it is reported that the Soviets have launched a second attack. The president reluctantly authorizes a multi-part all-out attack, with US ICBMs launched immediately, then submarine-launched ballistic missiles (SLBMs) in a few hours, coincident with the arrival of US Air Force bombers over the Soviet Union. General Renning issues the orders just before the first wave of Soviet missiles hits SAC headquarters and passes command of SAC to "Alice," the codename of an Air Force general in command of Looking Glass, a flying command aircraft for the US Air Force. The president takes off in Marine One and learns the second Soviet attack was directed at China, since it had launched its own missiles against the Soviets. Realizing his mistake, the president tries to cancel the retaliation order, but before he can do this a nearby nuclear detonation forces down his helicopter.

A B-52 bomber, commanded by Major Cassidy and his co-pilot Captain Moreau, takes off with callsign "Polar Bear 1" moments before Fairchild Air Force Base is destroyed. The crewmen are shaken by the unfolding events as a nuclear flash partially blinds Moreau and the ensuing shock wave kills another crew member. The bomber proceeds into Russia, at one point fending off Soviet interceptors.

An American admiral, codenamed "Harpoon," is in command of Nightwatch, a presidential flying command platform. With the president presumed dead, they swear in the Secretary of the Interior as president, codenamed "Condor". Harpoon briefs Condor regarding the Soviet leader's message, the mistake regarding China, and the damage already done by the initial retaliation. Colonel Fargo, a hawkish advisor on Nightwatch, advises Condor to continue American strikes. Condor agrees with Fargo's plan for a submarine missile and bomber attack, overruling Harpoon's plea to negotiate a ceasefire, and orders Alice to execute the remainder of the attack plan. Cassidy and Moreau react emotionally to these orders and convince their crew to abort the mission. Crewman Tyler, despondent over the loss of his family at Fairchild, kills himself by ejecting without a parachute, killing the entire crew except the two pilots.

The President is discovered badly injured at the crash site of Marine One and is taken to a FEMA emergency shelter where he learns of Condor's orders. He contacts the Soviet president and they agree to a one-hour standoff. Aboard Looking Glass, Alice notices that Polar Bear 1 has abandoned its attack and a Soviet squadron has apparently also turned back in response. Alice begs Condor to recall the rest of the US bombers so a ceasefire can be arranged. Condor instead orders Alice to send fighter aircraft to shoot down Polar Bear 1. Alice hesitates and Fargo informs Condor that they can send the command from Nightwatch. Condor cuts off communication with Looking Glass.

The President contacts Alice, and Looking Glass agrees to recall the bombers but lacks the authority to call off the submarine attack. Two US Navy carrier-based fighters intercept Polar Bear 1 over the Pacific Ocean to shoot it down, but when their aircraft carrier is sunk by a Soviet nuclear torpedo, they call off their attack and instead wish Polar Bear 1 good luck. The President finally connects with Condor. Fearing he is an impersonator, Condor orders the Nightwatch staff to contact the submarines and transmit launch orders. Alice and the Looking Glass staff decide to ram their plane into Nightwatch before Condor can send out launch orders, and the Nightwatch pilots sacrifice themselves by turning their aircraft into the path of Looking Glass. The President successfully issues a stand-down message to American forces as Cassidy and Moreau fly towards a sunrise, knowing their fuel will not last long enough to reach land, but relieved that the world has a future now.

== Cast ==
- Powers Boothe as Major Cassidy, USAF – pilot of the B-52 bomber "Polar Bear 1"
- Rebecca De Mornay as Captain Moreau, USAF – copilot of "Polar Bear 1"
- James Earl Jones as USAF Major General Charlie in command of the EC-135 "Looking Glass" – callsign "Alice"
- Martin Landau as President of the United States
- Darren McGavin as US Secretary of the Interior on the Boeing E-4 NEACP aircraft – callsign "Condor"
- Rip Torn as Colonel Fargo, USA – Army military advisor in the E-4
- Jeffrey DeMunn as USN Rear Admiral aboard the E-4 – callsign "Harpoon"
- Peter MacNicol as Lieutenant Commander Tom Sedgwick, USN – President's Emergency War Orders officer
- Nicolas Coster as General Clay Renning, USAF, at SAC headquarters – callsign "Icarus"
- Ken Jenkins as a USAF Colonel Sam aboard Looking Glass
- Richard Speight Jr. as a USAF guard

== Production ==
Principal photography took place from August 7 to late September 1989. The use of military hardware such as the B-52 bomber and Boeing E-4 enabled a realistic account of the Strategic Air Command in action.

=== Differences from the source material ===
There are two major differences between the plot of the novel and the film, the first being that the crisis in the novel is started by a deliberate Soviet attack to counter the US military buildup with which they are unable to compete. The other major difference in the film is the romantic subplot between Moreau and Cassidy, which is absent in the book; the characters there actually ridicule the idea of such a relationship between them.

== Reception ==
Contemporary reviews of By Dawn's Early Light centered on the confrontation by nuclear powers and gave it accolades. "There never has been a made-for-cable movie as sleek and efficient as By Dawn's Early Light. Fast-moving, complex, and only occasionally a bit hokey, it's by far the best original movie project HBO has overseen." "Boasting high production values, okay special effects, and a surprisingly top-notch cast... a thrilling drama that is your better-than-average made-for-TV movie." More recent reviews were similar: "Probably the end of the line for Cold War confrontation on this scale, but compelling drama nonetheless."

=== Awards and honors ===
In 1990, James Earl Jones was nominated for a Primetime Emmy Award for Outstanding Supporting Actor in a Miniseries or a Special and Matte World Digital won for Outstanding Achievement in Special Visual Effects.

In addition, Martin Landau was nominated for the 1991 CableACE Award for Best Supporting Actor in a Movie or Miniseries, but lost to his co-star from this film, James Earl Jones who won for Heat Wave.

== See also ==
- Fail-Safe, a 1962 book and a 1964 film with similar themes
- Red Alert, a 1958 novel

== Bibliography ==
- Frietas, Gary A. War Movies: The Belle & Blade Guide to Classic War Videos. Bandon, Oregon: Robert D. Reed Publishers, 2011. ISBN 978-1931741385.
- Lisboa, Maria Manuel. The End of the World: Apocalypse and Its Aftermath in Western Culture. Cambridge, UK: Open Book Publishers, 2011. ISBN 978-1-90692-450-8.
- Prochnau, William. Trinity's Child. London: Putnam Publishing Group, 1983. ISBN 978-0-399-12777-9.
