= Matte World Digital =

Former visual effects company

- Founded: 1988
- Founder: Craig Barron; Michael Pangrazio; Krystyna Demkowicz
- Defunct: 2012
- Headquarters: Novato, California, United States
- Services: Visual effects

Matte World Digital was a visual effects company founded by Craig Barron, Michael Pangrazio and Krystyna Demkowicz, based in Novato, California that specialized in realistic matte painting effects and digital environments for feature films, television, electronic games and IMAX large-format productions. The company closed in 2012 after 24 years of service in the entertainment industry.

== History ==
The company, initially called Matte World, was co-founded in 1988 by visual effects supervisor Craig Barron, matte painter Michael Pangrazio, and producer Krystyna Demkowicz. Barron and Pangrazio had worked together at Industrial Light & Magic, starting in 1979, when they helped create the matte-effects shots for George Lucas' The Empire Strikes Back. Barron and Pangrazio continued to work with the crew at ILM on notable matte-painting scenes in several classic features including Raiders of the Lost Ark, and E.T. the Extra-Terrestrial. Barron left ILM in 1988 after serving four years as supervisor of photography in the company’s matte department.

The Matte World team formed to provide realistic matte-painting effects for film and television. In 1992, the company was renamed Matte World Digital, reflecting the new technological tools available to matte painters. Since then, MWD has created digital-matte environments for films directed by (among others) Martin Scorsese, Francis Ford Coppola, James Cameron, and David Fincher.

After working on shots for more than 100 films, Matte World Digital closed its shop in August, 2012.

== Digital innovations ==
MWD was the first visual-effects company to apply radiosity rendering to film in Martin Scorsese’s Casino (1995). Recreating the 1970s-era Las Vegas strip was made possible by simulating the indirect bounce-light effect of millions of neon lights. Radiosity rendering allowed for the first true simulation of bounce-light in a computer-generated environment.

For David Fincher’s The Curious Case of Benjamin Button, one of MWD’s challenges was to create 29 digital matte paintings of a New Orleans train station and its various looks throughout time: new, run-down, and remodeled. To accomplish all these scenes from one 3D model, the company used Next Limit’s Maxwell rendering software—an architectural visualization tool—revamping the software to accurately mimic real-world lighting.

When Fincher requested a low-altitude helicopter shot over Paris, Barron took digital reference photos from a helicopter flying over the city at a higher altitude (as required since 9/11). Then the team at MWD used a flight simulator to determine aerial views at a lower height. Once the height and angles were worked out on the simulator and approved by Fincher, a high-resolution CG model was built for a completely computer-generated flight shot.

== Awards ==
Craig Barron won the 2009 Academy of Motion Picture Arts and Sciences and BAFTA Awards for achievement in visual effects for MWD's work in David Fincher’s The Curious Case of Benjamin Button. He was also nominated for achievement in visual effects by the Academy and BAFTA for shots created at MWD for Batman Returns (1992) and The Truman Show (1998). Barron, along with MWD team members, Michael Pangrazio, Charlie Mullin and Bill Mather, won an Emmy for outstanding visual effects for By Dawn's Early Light in 1990.

Matte World Digital is listed 76th in Animation Career Review's "Top 100 Most Influential Animation Studios of All-Time."

== Selected filmography ==
- Hugo, 2011
- Captain America: The First Avenger, 2011
- Alice in Wonderland, 2010
- Terminator Salvation, 2009
- X-Men Origins: Wolverine, 2009
- The Curious Case of Benjamin Button, 2008
- The Golden Compass, 2007
- Zodiac, 2007
- Invincible, 2006
- Greece: Secrets of the Past, 2006
- The Work and the Glory, 2004
- Catwoman, 2004
- The Last Samurai, 2003
- The Ring, 2002
- Lewis & Clark: Great Journey West, 2002
- Murder by Numbers, 2002
- The Majestic, 2001
- Jay and Silent Bob Strike Back, 2001
- Jurassic Park III, 2001
- Cats & Dogs, 2001
- The Mummy Returns, 2001
- Antitrust, 2001
- Dr. T & the Women, 2000
- X-Men, 2000
- Mission: Impossible 2, 2000
- The Testaments of One Fold and One Shepherd, 2000
- The Green Mile, 1999
- The Insider, 1999
- October Sky, 1999
- Soldier, 1998
- Return to Paradise, 1998
- The Truman Show, 1998
- The Newton Boys, 1998
- Great Expectations, 1998
- Kundun, 1997
- Wag the Dog, 1997
- Titanic, 1997
- A Simple Wish, 1997
- Con Air, 1997
- The Evening Star, 1996
- Star Trek: First Contact, 1996
- The Stupids, 1996
- Independence Day, 1996
- Diabolique, 1996
- Broken Arrow, 1996
- Dunston Checks In, 1996
- Casino, 1995
- Hackers, 1995
- Bushwhacked, 1995
- Operation Dumbo Drop, 1995
- Tall Tale, 1995
- The Jungle Book, 1994
- Clear and Present Danger, 1994
- The Shadow, 1994
- City Slickers II: The Legend of Curly's Gold, 1994
- Ace Ventura: Pet Detective, 1994
- Ghost in the Machine, 1993
- Demolition Man, 1993
- Malice, 1993
- The Real McCoy, 1993
- Hocus Pocus, 1993
- Hot Shots! Part Deux, 1993
- A Far Off Place, 1993
- Sommersby, 1993
- Lorenzo's Oil, 1992
- Home Alone 2: Lost in New York, 1992
- Bram Stoker’s Dracula, 1992
- Captain Ron, 1992
- Batman Returns, 1992
- Far and Away, 1992
- Star Trek VI: The Undiscovered Country, 1991
- Terminator 2: Judgment Day, 1991
- Robin Hood: Prince of Thieves, 1991
- Flight of the Intruder, 1991
- Avalon, 1990
- Darkman, 1990
- Arachnophobia, 1990
- RoboCop 2, 1990
- Gremlins 2: The New Batch, 1990
- By Dawn's Early Light (television), 1990
- Prancer, 1989
