= Rear projection =

In-camera visual effect

Rear projection (background projection, process photography, etc.) is one of many in-camera effects cinematic techniques in film production for combining foreground performances with pre-filmed backgrounds. It was widely used for many years in driving scenes, or to show other forms of "distant" background motion.

== Technique ==
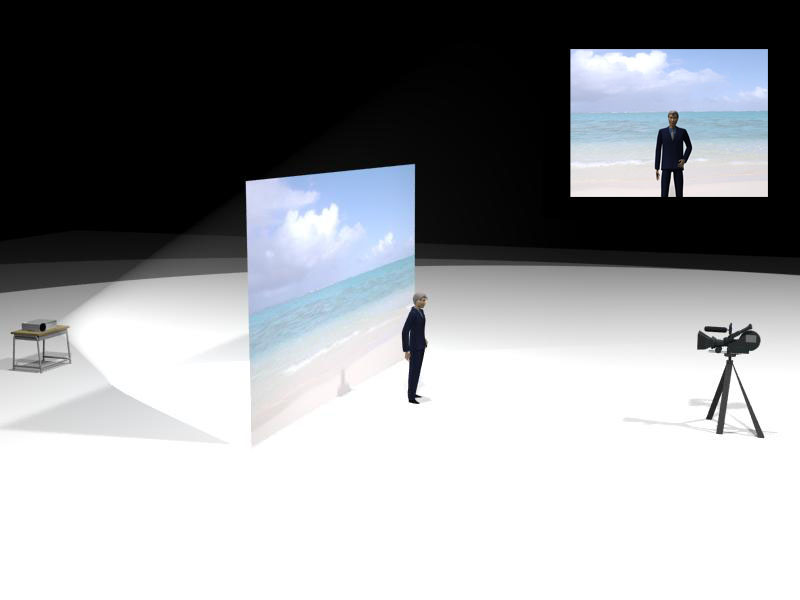
Rear projection effect

Actors stand in front of a screen while a projector positioned behind the screen casts a reversed image of the background. This requires a large space, as the projector needs to be placed some distance from the back of the screen. Frequently the background image may initially appear faint and washed out compared to the foreground. The image that is projected can be still or moving, but is always called the plate. One might hear the command "Roll plate" to instruct stage crew to begin projecting.

These so-called process shots were widely used to film actors as if they were inside a moving vehicle, who in reality are in a vehicle mock-up on a sound stage. In these cases the motion of the backdrop film and foreground actors and props were often different due to the lack of camera stabilizing in the filming from the moving vehicles used to produce the plate. This was most noticeable as bumps and jarring motions of the background image that would not be duplicated by the actors.

A major problem with rear projection use was that the image projected on the screen was always slightly less crisp than the action in front of it, an effect which was especially noticeable in sequences where footage with rear projection alternates with non-projection shots.

A major advance over rear projection is front projection, which uses a special screen material to allow the plate to be projected from the front of the screen. This results in a much sharper and more saturated image. Although the technique had been used experimentally for some time, it was during the filming of 2001: A Space Odyssey (1968) that the modern version was fully developed. In this case it was used to avoid costly on-location shots in Africa during the opening scenes of the movie, but the effect was also used throughout the film for a variety of shots into the windows of spacecraft. 2001 also used rear projection to produce computer screen effects.

As front projection and bluescreen effects became more widespread and less costly, rear projection has been rendered largely obsolete. Quentin Tarantino used the process for the taxi ride sequence in Pulp Fiction (1994). James Cameron also used rear projection for several special effects shots in Aliens (1986), including the crash of the dropship, as well as for several sequences in Terminator 2: Judgment Day (1991) such as the car escape from the mental hospital and the T-1000 hijacking the police helicopter; Cameron has been described as one of the few people in Hollywood still able to understand and use process photography as an effective technique. The Austin Powers film series (1997–2002) frequently used rear projection to help recreate the feel of old spy movies, while Natural Born Killers (1994) used the technique extensively throughout to emphasize characters' subconscious motivations.

== History ==
Rear projection was conceived long before its actual usage; however, it was only made possible in the 1930s due to three necessary technical developments. The most important was the development of camera and projector motors that could be linked up for synchronization of their shutters, which were developed out of the unrelated needs of "talking" movies whose timing had to be carefully controlled. Secondly, Eastman Kodak's introduction of panchromatic film stock in 1928 allowed for the camera to expose the projected background more than orthochromatic stocks, making it look less faint than it did before. Finally, the larger film gauges beginning to emerge in the late 1920s demanded more powerful projection lamps, which were subsequently available for making the rear projection screen brighter and thus more properly exposed.

In 1930, Fox Film Corporation was the first to use the rear projection technique, with their films Liliom and then Just Imagine, and were subsequently awarded a technical Oscar for their work the next year. Shortly after this debut, Farciot Edouart A.S.C., at Paramount Pictures, refined the technique, starting in 1933, and developed several new methods such as syncing three projectors with the same background plate for more even and bright exposure. Linwood Dunn ASC, at RKO Radio Pictures, expanded on this with the use of traveling matte with films like Flying Down to Rio (1933). The first ever full-scale rear projection was created by famed special effects director Eiji Tsuburaya for Arnold Fanck's German–Japanese film The Daughter of the Samurai.

In the late 1940s, David Rawnsley introduced the technique in four minor British films, when it was heavily criticized.

Alfred Hitchcock was a master at using process screenshots, mixing them with location shots so that the slight artificiality of the process screen shots does not distract from the action. He used the process to show Cary Grant's character being attacked by a crop duster plane in North by Northwest and throughout the film, but it was criticized when he used it extensively in Marnie.

Fantasy filmmaker Ray Harryhausen pioneered a variation of rear projection in the 1950s and 1960s with Dynamation, whereby the rear screen was placed on a miniature set along with stop-motion creatures. Harryhausen figured out a way to synchronize the movement of the miniature figures with the background projection as a way to insert live-action humans in the same scene as the creatures.

== See also ==
- Bipack
- Optical printer "The Hansard Process"
- Schüfftan process
- Traveling matte
- StageCraft
- Sodium vapor process
- Matte painting
