= Hanging miniature =

In-camera special effect

Hanging miniature is an in-camera special effect similar to a matte shot where a model, rather than a painting, is placed in the foreground and the action takes place in the background. It is thus a specific form of forced perspective.

== Description ==
There are hundreds of instances where a hanging miniature has been used. This is a very old device and when produced correctly it is almost completely undetectable. The chariot race in the 1925 version of Ben-Hur is a good example. Only a very careful examination will reveal that above the wall surrounding the stadium and the first rows of bleachers, there hangs a miniature with moving 'puppet' people that can rise and fall with the human extras. Another cost saving effect was that of 'flopping' the negative so that only one side of the stadium miniature was built. The main reason for using a miniature in this way is that, unlike a painting, the light on the built set will always be the same as that on the miniature, making it possible to shoot in a variety of different 'lights' during the day.

== See also ==
- Shot (filmmaking)
- Filmmaking
