= Evan Jacobs =

American visual effects supervisor

- Jacobs in Los Angeles
- Born: October 24, 1968 (age 57); Lansing, Michigan, U.S.
- Occupation: Creative Finishing Supervisor
- Spouse: Clara Jacobs
- Website: evanjacobs.com

Evan Jacobs (born 1964 in Michigan) is an American visual effects and 3D stereoscopic supervisor. Jacobs has overseen visual effects and served as miniatures supervisor on the feature films such as Olympus Has Fallen, Ed Wood, What the #$*! Do We Know?!, and Resident Evil: Extinction.

Jacobs served as the 3D stereoscopic supervisor on Marvel's Guardians of the Galaxy and Captain America: The Winter Soldier as well as Conan the Barbarian 3D for Lionsgate.

Jacobs was born in Michigan and moved to California in the early 1970s with his family. His father, Dan Jacobs, is a noted jazz musician. He made short films with a camera he received as a gift, and later studied acting and directing at South Coast Repertory and Milton Katselas' Beverly Hills Playhouse.

Jacobs worked with Boss Film Studios, Fantasy II Film Effects, then co-founded Vision Crew Unlimited in 1994. After the company went bankrupt, he worked independently, spent two years at Digital Domain, then went to Mr X Inc. in Toronto in 2005. In 2007 Jacobs supervised visual effects for Resident Evil: Extinction and Walk Hard: The Dewey Cox Story. Jacobs was recognized for his work on Ben 10: Race Against Time and Ben 10: Alien Swarm both of which were nominated for Outstanding Visual Effects by the Visual Effects Society.

In 2010, Jacobs was nominated for the Emmy Award for Outstanding Special Visual Effects for his work on Ben 10: Alien Swarm. Previously, in 1998, Jacobs was also nominated for HBO's From the Earth to the Moon.

Jacobs is an active member of the Academy of Motion Picture Arts and Sciences Producers Guild of America and the Visual Effects Society. He was a part time instructor for the Entertainment Studies Extension Program at University of California Los Angeles (UCLA) for three years.

Jacobs is also a fine art still photographer. His photography has been featured in galleries and major publications as well as the book “Vesage” from Ballistic Publishing. In 2008, he took part in the Visual Amalgam Art Show at Bergamot Station in Santa Monica, California. He has also directed short films.

Evan Jacobs married Script Supervisor and Assistant Director, Clara Gheorghiu on March 22, 2008 in Napa Valley, California. They have two children together.

== Selected filmography ==
- Doctor Strange in the Multiverse of Madness (2022) - Creative Finishing Supervisor
- Spider-Man: No Way Home (2021) - Creative Finishing Supervisor
- Shang-Chi and the Legend of the Ten Rings (2021) - Creative Finishing Supervisor
- Moon Knight (2021) - Creative Finishing Supervisor
- Hawkeye (2021) - Creative Finishing Supervisor
- Black Widow (2021) - Creative Finishing Supervisor
- Loki (2021) - Creative Finishing Supervisor
- WandaVision (2021) - Creative Finishing Supervisor
- Avengers: Endgame (2019) - Creative Finishing Supervisor
- Captain Marvel (2019) - Creative Finishing Supervisor
- Ant-Man and the Wasp (2018) - Senior Stereoscopic 3D Supervisor
- Avengers: Infinity War (2018) - 3D Stereoscopic Supervisor
- Black Panther (2018) - 3D Stereoscopic Supervisor
- Thor: Ragnarok (2017) - 3D Stereoscopic Supervisor
- Spider-Man: Homecoming (2017) - 3D Stereoscopic Supervisor
- Guardians of the Galaxy Vol. 2 (2017) - 3D Stereoscopic Supervisor
- Doctor Strange (2016) - 3D Stereoscopic Supervisor
- Captain America: Civil War (2016) - 3D Stereoscopic Supervisor
- Ant-Man (2015) - 3D Stereoscopic Supervisor, 2nd Unit Visual Effects Supervisor
- Avengers: Age of Ultron (2015) - 3D Stereoscopic Supervisor
- Guardians of the Galaxy (2014) - 3D Stereoscopic Supervisor
- Captain America: The Winter Soldier (2014) - 3D Stereoscopic Supervisor
- Olympus Has Fallen (2013)
- Killing Season (2014)
- Conan the Barbarian 3D (2011) - 3D Stereoscopic Supervisor
- Alice in Wonderland (2010)
- Ben 10: Alien Swarm (2009)
- Fire and Ice: The Dragon Chronicles (2008)
- Ben 10: Race Against Time (2007)
- Walk Hard: The Dewey Cox Story (2007)
- Resident Evil: Extinction (2007)
- Silent Hill (2006)
- Hollywoodland (2006)
- Dinosaur (2000)
- The Mummy (1999)
- Armageddon (1998)
- From the Earth to the Moon (1998)
- Titanic (1997)
- Dante's Peak (1997)
- Mortal Kombat Annihilation (1997)
- Outbreak (1995)
- Ed Wood (1994)
- The Hunt for Red October (1990)
