= Mark Rappaport (creature effects artist) =

American special-effects artist

Mark Rappaport (born 1954) is an American special make-up effects artist.

Working in film and theater, Rappaport and his company Creature Effects, Inc specialize in creating hyper-realistic make-up effects and animatronic animals, including the horse ridden by Tom Cruise in The Last Samurai, and prosthetic makeup effects for 300 and I Am Legend.

== Biography ==
Rappaport was born in Yokohama, Japan. At the age of three, his family moved to the Napa Valley in northern California. He graduated from Justin-Siena High School in Napa and attended San Diego State University where he earned a Bachelor of Science Degree. Upon graduation, he returned to Northern California and worked in law enforcement before meeting and working with Bob Hartman, a San Francisco puppeteer and street performer. His work with Hartman sparked an interest in creating effects for the entertainment industry and he pursued employment at Industrial Light & Magic. At ILM he worked on feature film projects, including Innerspace and Star Trek IV: The Voyage Home. From ILM, Rappaport went to work with Chris Walas and created effects for films including The Fly II and Child's Play.

== Career ==
=== The Last Samurai ===
The production of The Last Samurai required an animatronic horse capable of performing stunt sequences that would put a real horse and rider at risk of great injury. Rappaport was commissioned to build a horse that could seamlessly replace Tom Cruise' real horse for those scenes. Rappaport said "It's probably the most sophisticated horse or animatronic creature ever made for film. It cost $1.5 million to make. It gallops in place. It reared up. It fell over. And it looks completely real."

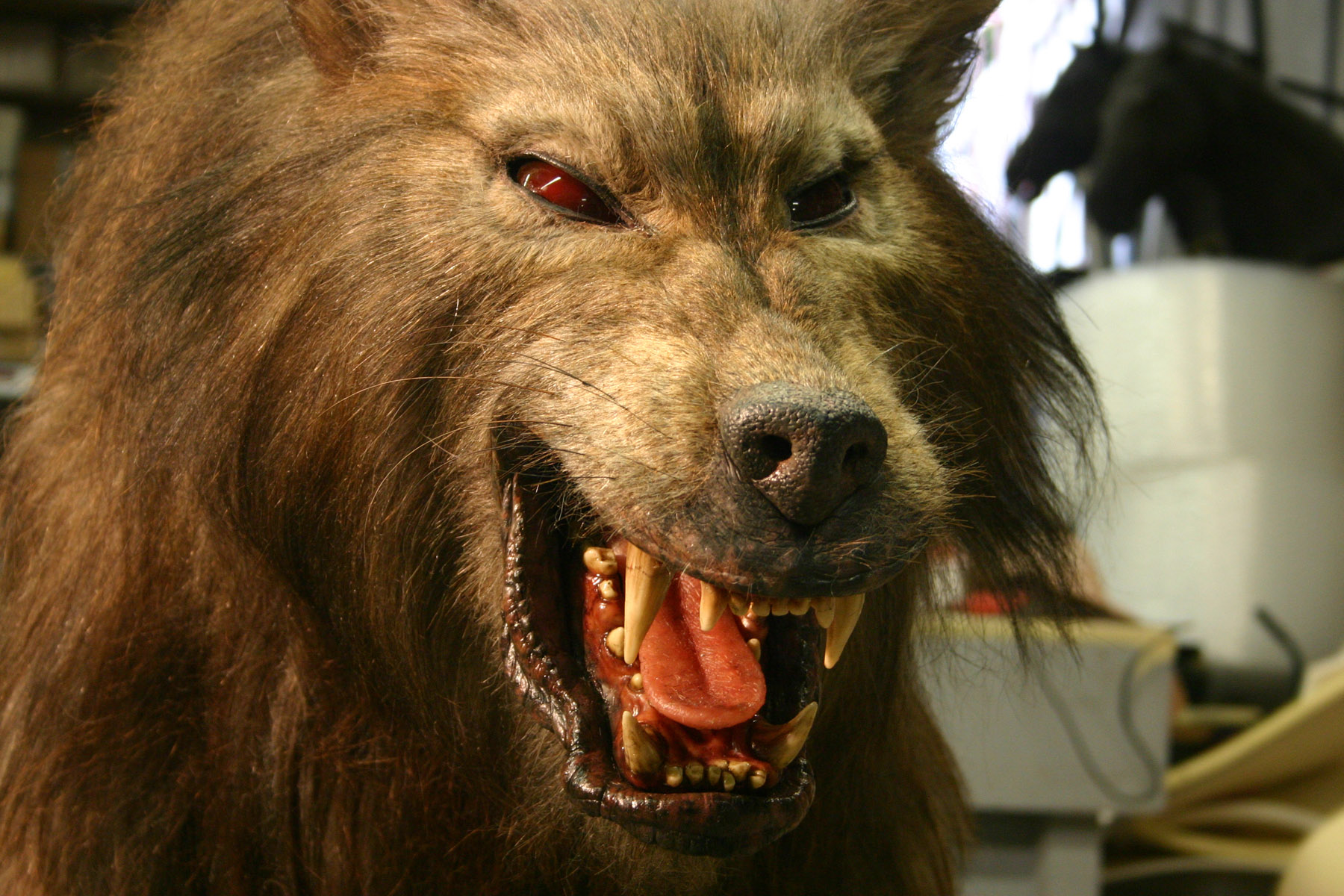
Animatronic wolf puppet created by Creature Effects, Inc. for the feature film 300

=== 300 ===
Rappaport (creature effects supervisor) and Shaun Smith (makeup effects supervisor) teamed up to create the world of effects for 300. This extensive body of work included prosthetic makeups, animatronic animals, props, weaponry and costume elements. In addition to the amazingly lifelike horse effects for this film, Rappaport created an animatronic wolf puppet for scenes where young Leonidas faces off with the predatory animal. "The filmmakers shot interactions of the practical puppet attacking young Leonidas in a narrow rock crevice. Veteran creature effects supervisor Mark Rappaport and his team mechanized the puppet with: eye-blinks; head, neck, brow, jaw and tongue movement; saliva tubes and glowing eyes."

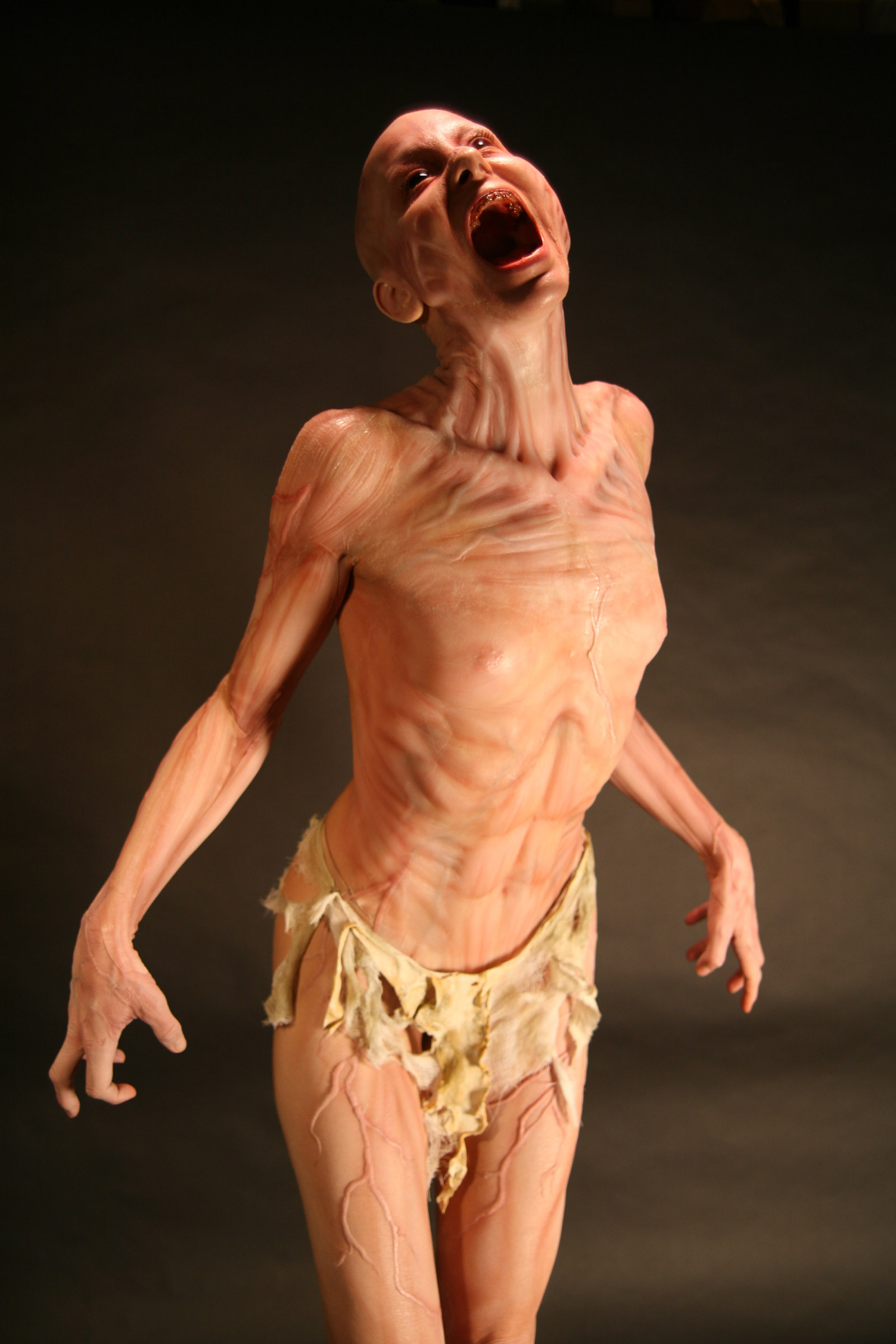
Full body, silicone appliance makeup created by Creature Effects, Inc. for the feature film I Am Legend

=== I Am Legend ===
For I Am Legend, starring Will Smith Mark Rappaport developed full body silicone makeups for the primal, aggressive beings known as "Darkseekers". The translucent makeup creates the look of zombie infection and a spiked metabolism desired by director Francis Lawrence. The makeups were to be applied to very thin performers to create the look of zero body-fat and protruding veins. The makeups included rotten teeth dentures and fully dilated pupil contact lenses. In addition to the creature makeups, Mark's studio created animatronic puppets of the likeness of "Sam" the German Shepherd, a digitally scan model for the infected dogs, scar and knife wound moulage for Will Smith and numerous other effects for the production.

=== Other projects ===
After designing and producing a rideable animatronic horse for The Chronicles of Narnia: Prince Caspian, Mark's Studio created a second ride-able horse for Bedtime Stories. The motion and animatronic features of the two horses were enhanced and refined for True Grit and further developed for Cowboys & Aliens. The animatronic horses are used where the action (if performed by real horses) might put the riders or horses at risk of harm or injury.

== Filmography ==
- The Revenant (2015) (animatronic horses)
- Cowboys & Aliens (2011) (animatronic horses)
- True Grit (2010) (animatronic horses)
- Shutter Island (2009) (blood effects)
- Dance Flick (2009) (makeup effects and animatronic effects)
- Don't Look Up (2009) (makeup effects and animatronic effects)
- The Awakened (2009) (creature effects)
- Bedtime Stories (2008) (animatronic effects)
- Soul Men (2008) (makeup effects)
- Meet the Spartans (2008) (creature effects supervisor)
- Bratz: The Movie (2007) (creature effects)
- Shooter (2007) (animatronic effects)
- The Chronicles of Narnia: Prince Caspian (2008) (creature effects)
- I Am Legend (2007) (creature effects supervisor)
- The Comebacks (2007) (animatronic effects)
- The Departed (2006) (blood effects)
- Epic Movie (2007) (creature effects supervisor)
- 300 (2006) (creature effects supervisor)
- In the Name of the King: A Dungeon Siege Tale (2007) (animatronic effects)
- Date Movie (2006) (creature effects supervisor)
- Flicka (2006) (animatronic effects)
- Four Brothers (2005) (animatronic effects)
- The Chronicles of Narnia: The Lion, the Witch and the Wardrobe (2005) (animatronic effects)
- The Alamo (2004) (animal props)
- The Last Samurai (2003) (hero animatronic horse)
- Seabiscuit (2003) (animatronic effects)
- Terminator 3: Rise of the Machines (mechanical props)
- Scooby-Doo! The Mystery Begins (scan reference and eyeline models)
- The Core (bird effects)
- Punch-Drunk Love (gloves for Adam Sandler)
- Scary Movie 2 (makeup effects and props)
- No Such Thing (makeup effects)
- Pterodactyl (creatures and makeup)
- Dragonfly (animatronic baby)
- Backlot Murders (makeup and props)
- T2 3-D: Battle Across Time (animatronic mechanical arms)
- Predator 2 (weaponry)
- Army of Darkness (animatronic skeletons)

== See also ==
- Prosthetic makeup
- Special effect
- Animatronics
- In-camera effect
