= Bipack =

Cinematography visual effect process

Diagram of the bipack filming principle.: A - back film feeding reel; B - back film take-up reel; C - front film feeding reel; D - front film take-up reel; E - sprocket; F - film gate; G - lens; 1 - front film base; 2 - front film orthochromatic emulsion; 3 - front film red filter layer; 4 - back film panchromatic emulsion; 5 - back film base

In cinematography, bipacking, or a bipack, is the process of loading two reels of film into a camera, so that they both pass through the camera gate together. It was used both for in-camera effects (effects that are nowadays mainly achieved via optical printing) and as an early subtractive colour process.

== Use as a color process ==
Eastman, Agfa, Gevaert, and DuPont all manufactured bipack film stocks for use in color processes from the 1920s onwards. Two strips of film, one orthochromatic and having a very thin and superficial red dye layer on its emulsion, and one panchromatic, would be exposed together with their emulsions pressed into close contact, the orthochromatic one nearer the lens. The orthochromatic negative ended up reversed from the normal handedness, but as the two negatives were often contact-printed onto one duplitized film for subsequent color-toning, as in the Prizma process, this often worked to the advantage of the laboratory.

Early color processes such as Prizmacolor, Multicolor, Cinecolor, and Trucolor all used bipack film.

The most famous version of Technicolor, the full-color three-strip Technicolor Process 4 used from 1932 to 1955, exposed two of the three strips—the blue and red images—in bipack. The green record, the highest definition record, was exposed directly.

Alas, certain early color TV transfers were exposed without respect to whether the film was wound conventionally on the reel (A-wind, i.e. emulsion facing toward the hub) or whether the wind was reversed (B-wind) rendering the resulting color image as somewhat faulty, i.e. due to the thickness of the film itself, one primary color was out-of-focus. Later transfers corrected this error.

== Use as an in-camera effect ==
To achieve the in-camera effect, a reel would be made up of pre-exposed and developed film, and unexposed raw film, which would then be loaded into the camera. The exposed film would sit in front of the unexposed film, with the emulsion of both films touching each other, causing the images on the exposed film to be contact-printed onto the unexposed stock, along with the image from the camera lens. This method, in conjunction with a static matte placed in front of the camera, could be used to print angry storm clouds into a background on a studio set. The process differs from optical printing in that no optical elements (lenses, field lenses, etc.) separate the two films. Both films are sandwiched together in the same camera and make use of a phenomenon known as contact printing.

The process had its beginnings in providing a repeatable method of compositing live action and matte paintings, allowing the painted section of the final image to be completed later, and not tying up the set/sound-stage whilst the artist matched the painting to the set. It also alleviated the considerable difficulties caused by matching shadows on the painting to the set on an open-air set. The process worked equally well for matting-in real water to a model, or a model skyline to live action. The process was also referred to as the Held Take process. Perhaps the most famous example of a held take is the long shot of astronauts clambering down into a lunar excavation in 2001: A Space Odyssey.

The technique, if used with a camera not specially designed for contact printing, runs the risk of jamming the camera, due to the double thickness of film in the gate, and damaging both the exposed and unexposed stock. On the other hand, because both strips of film are in contact and are handled by the same film transport mechanism at the same time, registration is kept very precise. Special cameras designed for the process were manufactured by Acme and Oxberry, amongst others, and these usually featured an extremely precise registration mechanism specially designed for the process. These process cameras are usually recognisable by their special film magazines, which look like two standard film magazines on top of each other. The magazines allow the separate loading of exposed and unexposed stock, as opposed to winding the two films onto the same reel.

The bipack process, which is a competing method to optical printing, was used until digital methods of compositing became predominant in the industry. Industrial Light and Magic used a specially built rig built for The Empire Strikes Back that utilised the method to create matte painting composites.

== Dunning process ==
Various improvements and extensions of the process followed, the most famous being Carroll D. Dunning's, an early method built on the bipacking technique and used for creating traveling mattes. It is described thus:

The foreground action is lighted with yellow light only in front of a uniform, strongly lighted blue backing. Panchromatic negative film is used in the camera as the rear component of a bipack in which the front film is a positive yellow dye image of the background scene. This yellow dye image is exposed on the negative by the blue light from the backing areas, but the yellow light from the foreground passes through it and records an image of the foreground at the same time.

The Dunning Process, often in shorthand referred to as "process," was used in many black and white films, most notably King Kong. Its chief limitation was that it could not be used for color cinematography, and the process died out with the increasing move toward production of films in color.

== See also ==
- Optical printer
- Schüfftan process
- Special effect
- Matte (filmmaking)
