= Miniature effect =

Special effect created for motion pictures and television programs using scale models

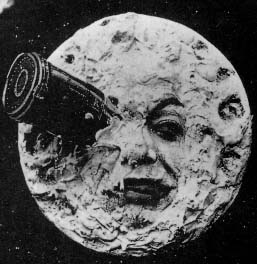
Early model use from "A Trip to the Moon"

A miniature effect is a special effect created for motion pictures and television programs using scale models. Scale models are often combined with high speed photography or matte shots to make gravitational and other effects appear convincing to the viewer. The use of miniatures has largely been superseded by computer-generated imagery in contemporary cinema.

Where a miniature appears in the foreground of a shot, this is often very close to the camera lens — for example when matte-painted backgrounds are used. Since the exposure is set to the object being filmed so the actors appear well-lit, the miniature must be over-lit in order to balance the exposure and eliminate any depth of field differences that would otherwise be visible. This foreground miniature usage is referred to as forced perspective. Another form of miniature effect uses stop motion animation.

The use of scale models in the creation of visual effects by the entertainment industry dates back to the earliest days of cinema. Models and miniatures are copies of people, animals, buildings, settings, and objects. Miniatures or models are used to represent things that do not really exist, or that are too expensive or difficult to film in reality, such as explosions, floods, or fires.

== From 1900 to the mid-1960s ==
French director Georges Méliès incorporated special effects in his 1902 film Le Voyage dans la Lune (A Trip to the Moon) — including double-exposure, split screens, miniatures and stop-action.

Some of the most influential visual effects films of these early years such as Metropolis (1927), Citizen Kane (1941), Godzilla (1954) The Ten Commandments (1956). The 1933 film King Kong made extensive use of miniature effects including scale models and stop-motion animation of miniature elements.

== From the mid-1960s ==
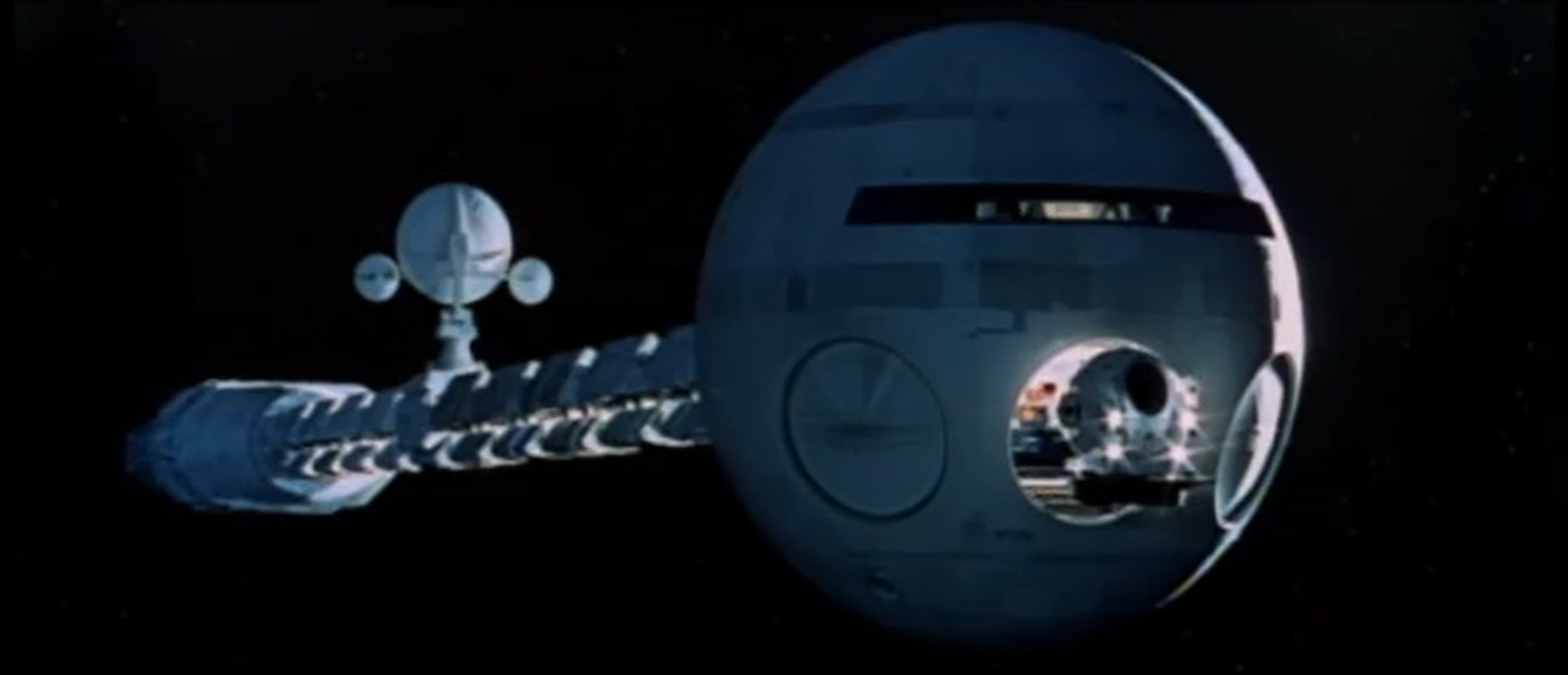
Miniature-based special effects shot from 2001: A Space Odyssey: USSC Discovery One deploys an EVA Pod.

The use of miniatures in 2001: A Space Odyssey was a major development. In production for three years, the film was a significant advancement in creating convincing models.

In the early 1970s, miniatures were often used to depict disasters in such films as The Poseidon Adventure (1972), Earthquake (1974) and The Towering Inferno (1974).

The resurgence of the science fiction genre in film in the late 1970s saw miniature fabrication rise to new heights in such films as Close Encounters of the Third Kind, (1977), Star Wars (also 1977), Alien (1979), Star Trek: The Motion Picture (1979) and Blade Runner (1982). Iconic film sequences such as the tanker truck explosion from The Terminator (1984) and the bridge destruction in True Lies (1994) were achieved through the use of large-scale miniatures.

== Largely replaced by CGI ==
The release of Jurassic Park (1993) was a turning point in the use of computers to create effects for which physical miniatures would have previously been employed.

While the use of computer-generated imagery (CGI) has largely overtaken their use since then, they are still often employed, especially for projects requiring physical interaction with fire, explosions, or water.

Independence Day (1996), Titanic (1997), Godzilla (1998), the Star Wars prequel trilogy (1999–2005), The Lord of the Rings trilogy (2001–2003), Casino Royale (2006), The Dark Knight (2008), Inception (2010), and Interstellar (2014) are examples of highly successful films that have utilized miniatures for a significant component of their visual effects work.

== Techniques ==
- Acid-etching metal
- Carpentry
- Fiberglass
- Kit-bashing
- Laser cutting
- Machining
- Miniature lighting and electronics
- Mold Making and Casting
- Motion control photography
- Painting
- Plastic fabrication
- Rapid prototyping
- Vacuum forming
- Welding

== Notable model-makers ==
- Brick Price: The Abyss
- David Jones: Star Wars, The Hunt for Red October
- Grant McCune: Star Wars, Battlestar Galactica, Star Trek: The Motion Picture.
- Greg Jein: Close Encounters of the Third Kind, Star Trek: The Next Generation
- Ian Hunter: The Dark Knight, Live Free or Die Hard, The Chronicles of Narnia: The Lion, the Witch and the Wardrobe
- Leigh Took: The Da Vinci Code, The Imaginarium of Doctor Parnassus
- Lorne Peterson: Star Wars Episodes 1 - 6, Raiders of the Lost Ark, Battlestar Galactica, War of the Worlds
- Mark Stetson: Blade Runner, Die Hard, The Fifth Element, The Lord of the Rings
- Matthew Gratzner: The Aviator, The Good Shepherd, Pitch Black, Alien Resurrection.
- Michael Joyce: The Terminator, Independence Day
- Patrick McClung: The Empire Strikes Back, Aliens, The Abyss, True Lies
- Richard Taylor: The Lord of the Rings, Master and Commander: The Far Side of the World
- Steve Gawley: Star Wars, Raiders of the Lost Ark

== Miniature effects companies ==
- Vision Crew Unlimited
- Weta Workshop
- WonderWorks
