= Vision Crew Unlimited =

American visual effects company

- Company type: Privately held company
- Industry: Visual effects, CGI
- Founded: 1994
- Defunct: 2002
- Fate: Closed
- Headquarters: Los Angeles, California, United States
- Key people: Evan Jacobs, Jon Warren, Douglas Miller
- Number of employees: 20-50
- Website: VisionCrew.com

Vision Crew Unlimited (VCU) was a motion picture and TV commercial visual effects company founded in 1994 by visual effects artists Evan Jacobs, Jon Warren and Douglas Miller. The company later expanded into a full service visual effects firm.

In 1996, VCU contributed miniature effects to James Cameron's film Titanic. While they were initially hired as a subcontractor to lead effects house Digital Domain, VCU was ultimately hired directly by 20th Century Fox to build miniatures for the engine room sequence as well. In an interesting coincidence later that same year, the company was contracted to work on a CBS TV miniseries with the same name.

While the company worked on many feature films, they were much more prolific in the television commercial market, and worked on over forty spots in eight years. Their work was featured in ads for the majority of car brands as well as Coca-Cola, Pizza Hut, and Geico.

In 1998, Jacobs and John Hoffman were nominated for an Emmy Award for Outstanding Special Visual Effects for a Miniseries representing VCU's work on HBO's "From the Earth to the Moon".

Vision Crew closed in April 2002. The company attributed its shutdown to a difficult business climate and the founders' interest in pursuing other projects and opportunities.

== Credits ==
=== Feature films ===
- The Mummy
- Dinosaur
- Jack Frost
- Armageddon
- Species II
- Mortal Kombat Annihilation
- Flubber
- Dante's Peak
- The Fifth Element
- Titanic
- The Arrival
- Kazaam
- Space Jam
- Sometimes They Come Back...Again

=== Episodic and long-form television ===
- Monday Night Football graphics
- Star Trek: Voyager episode "The Killing Game"
- From The Earth To The Moon
- The Outer Limits "To Tell the Truth"
- Tower of Terror
- Tempting Fate
- A Wing and a Prayer
- Titanic (miniseries)

=== Television commercials ===
Saint Paul Insurance "Boat"	Dodge "Truckville"	Buick "Igor"
Ford Explorer "Geyser"	Evolution Trailer	Chrysler "Bridge"
Oscar Mayer "Kid Kong"	UUNet "Tower" & "Train"	Motomaster
Dodge "Diesel"	Anti-Smoking "Stereo Kid" PSA	Sony PlayStation "Access Granted"
Hyundai "Expand"	Mercedes print ad	Jeep "Hand"
Toyota "Tundra"	Lexus "Fly"	Dodge "Saw"
Land Rover print ad	Zyrtec "Apartment" & "Attic"	Garlic Tabasco "Vampire"
Mercedes "Performance"	Anti-Smoking PSA "50 Ways"	Lexus "High Bank" & "Hanger"
Mazda "Transmission"	Zyrtec "Power"	Mighty Mighty Bosstones "Royal Oil"
Diet Dr. Pepper "Shuttle"	Nissan "Toys II"	Geico "Lake"
Geico "Alternate Transportation"	Hi-C "Blast"	Pizza Hut "Bread Subs"
Jeep "Recognize It"	Duracell "Fishing"	Plymouth "Shakers"
New York-New York Hotel & Casino	Jeep "Ice Fishing"	Plymouth "Mighty Mouse"
Coca-Cola "Things We Know"	Broken Arrow teaser trailer	Acclaim NFL Quarterback Club
