= Video matting =

Video matting is a technique for separating the video into two or more layers, usually foreground and background, and generating alpha mattes which determine blending of the layers. The technique is very popular in video editing because it allows to substitute the background, or process the layers individually.

== Video matting methods ==
=== Problem definition ===
When combining two images the alpha matte is utilized, also known as the transparency map. In the case of digital video, the alpha matte is a sequence of images. The matte can serve as a binary mask, defining which of the image parts are visible. In a more complicated case it enables smooth blending of the images, the alpha matte is used as the transparency map of the top image. Film production has known alpha matting since the very creation of filmmaking. The mattes were drawn by hand. Nowadays, the process can be automatized with computer algorithms.

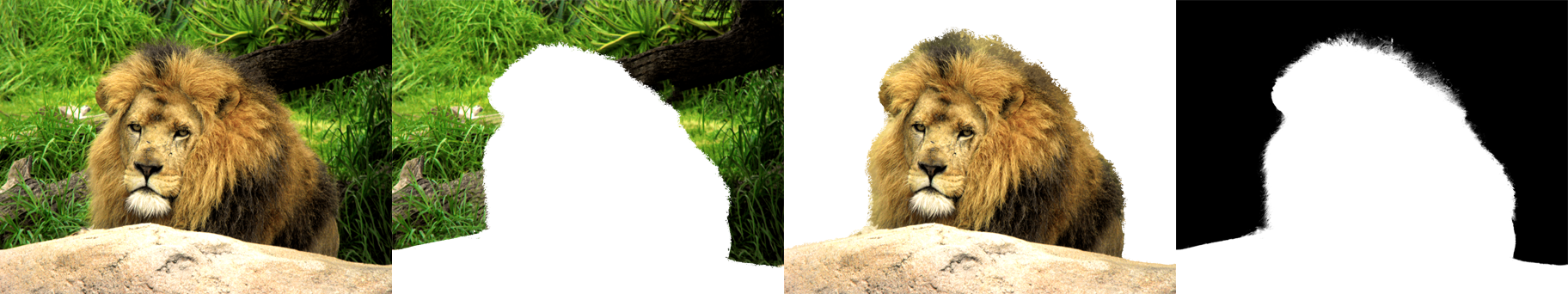
Left to right: input image, background, foreground, and alpha matte.

The basic matting problem is defined as following: given an image $I$, compute the foreground $F$, background $B$ and alpha matte $A$, such that the equation $I=AF+(1-A)B$ holds true. This equation has trivial solution $A=1$, $F=I$, $B$ is any image. Thus, usually an additional trimap must be provided as input. The trimap specifies background, foreground, and uncertain pixels, which will be decomposed into foreground and background by the matting method.

The main criteria for video matting methods from a user perspective are following:

- Accurate edge processing
- Time stability
- Minimal user intervention

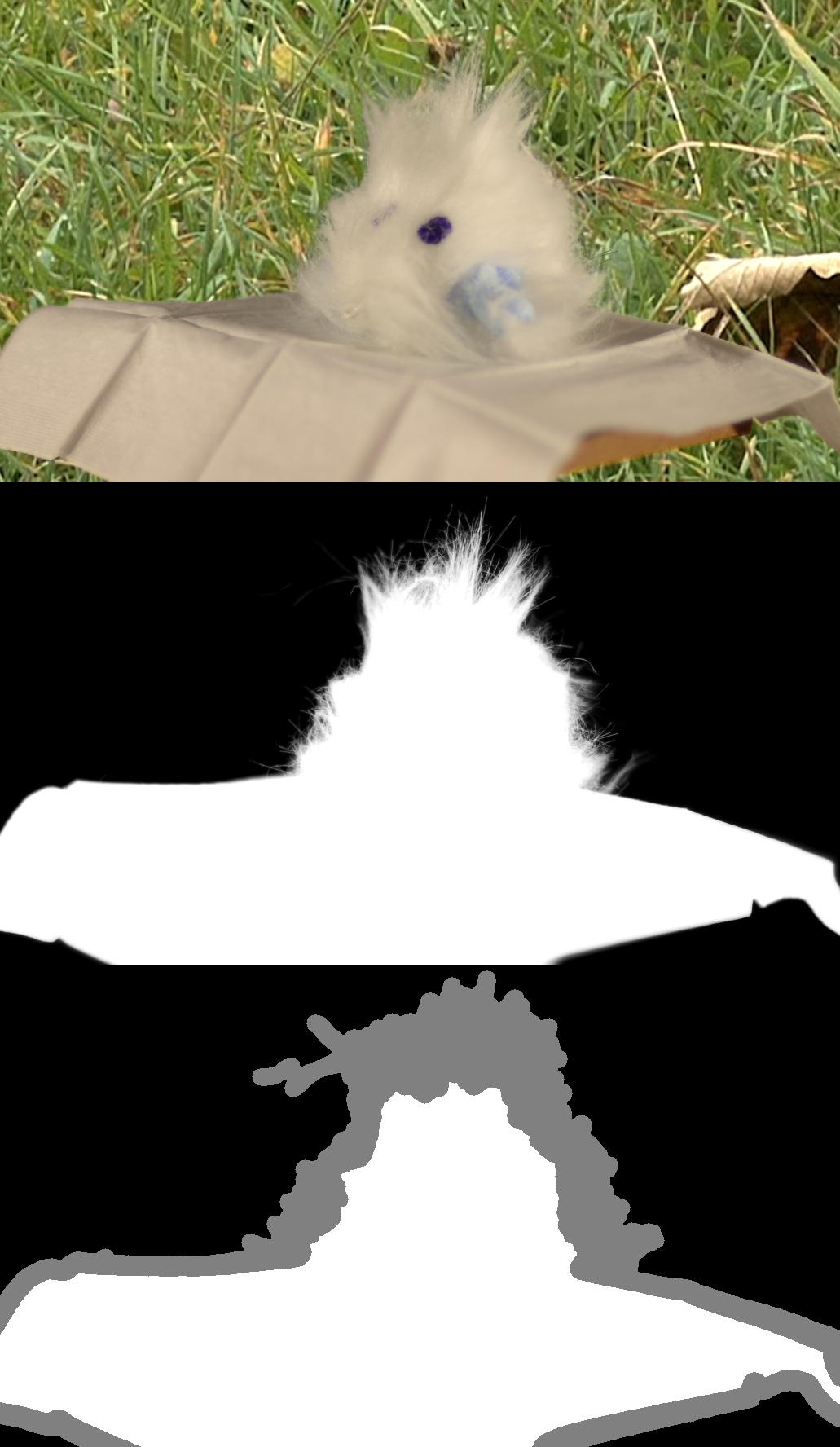
The trimap (bottom) is used as a guide for estimating the alpha matte. White pixels are foreground, black pixels are background and grey pixels are yet to be estimated. Matting algorithms take the complete frame (top) and the trimap as input to produce the alpha matte (middle)

=== Learning-based Methods ===
Deep learning methods are based on learning distribution of visual content from data, and use that knowledge for video editing.

An early deep learning method was developed for image matting in 2017, which improved over most traditional methods.

OmniMatte extended the video matting problem to associate objects that appear in a video with their artefacts: Shadows, reflections, and perturbations of the environment. They showed that a model can be trained to separate a given video into its OmniMatte layers.

GenerativeOmniMatte showed how the task can be achieved by far less data by fine-tuning a generative video diffusion model. That model has already learned the distribution of video content for the purpose of generating videos.

Finally, OmniMatteZero showed that separation into onimatte layers does not require training at all, but can be achieved using the internal representation of a pre-trained text-to-video model.

=== No-learning Methods ===
The first known video matting method was developed in 2001. The method utilizes optical flow for trimap propagation and a Bayesian image matting technique which is applied to each image separately.

Video SnapCut, which later was incorporated in Adobe After Effects as Roto Brush tool, was developed in 2009. The method makes use of local classifiers for binary image segmentation near the target object's boundary. The results of the segmentation are propagated to the next frame using optical flow, and an image matting algorithm is applied.

A method from 2011 was also included in Adobe After Effects as Refine Edge tool. The propagation of trimap with optical flow was enhanced with control points along the object edge. The method uses per-image matting, but temporal coherence was improved with a temporal filter.

== Benchmarking ==
Video matting is a rapidly-evolving field with many practical applications. However, in order to compare the quality of the methods, they must be tested on a benchmark. The benchmark consists of a dataset with test sequences and a result comparison methodology. Currently there exists one major video matting online benchmark, which uses chroma keying and stop motion for ground truth estimation. After method submission, the rating for each method is derived from objective metrics. As objective metrics do not represent human perception of quality, a subjective survey is necessary to provide adequate comparison.

Top 5 video matting methods
Method	Year of development	Ranking place
Deep Image Matting	2016	1
Self-Adaptive	2016	2
Learning Based	2009	3
Sparse Sampling	2016	4
Closed Form	2008	5

== Practical use ==
=== Object cutout ===
Video matting methods are required in video editing software. The most common application is cutting out and transferring an object into another scene. The tool allows users to cut out a moving object by interactively painting areas that must or must not belong to the object, or specifying complete trimaps as input. There are several software implementations:

- An interactive video cutout system
- Adobe After Effects Rotobrush tool
- Adobe After Effects Refine Edge tool
- YUVSoft Matting plugin for Adobe After Effects

To enhance the speed and quality of matting, some methods use additional data. For example, time-of-flight cameras had been explored in real-time matting systems.

=== Background replacement ===
Another application of video matting is background matting, which is very popular in online video calls. A Zoom plugin had been developed, and Skype announced Background Replace in June 2020. Video matting methods also allow to apply video effects only to background or foreground.

=== 3D video editing ===
Video matting is crucial in 2D to 3D conversion, where the alpha matte is used to correctly process transparent objects. It is also employed in stereo to multiview conversion.

=== Video completion ===
Closely related to matting is video completion after removal of an object in the video. While matting is used to separate the video into several layers, completion allows to fill gaps with plausible contents from the video after removing one of the layers.

== See also ==
- Foreground detection – Concept in computer vision
- Optical flow – Pattern of motion in a visual scene due to relative motion of the observer
- Video processing – Particular case of image processing
- Alpha compositing – Operation in computer graphics
