= Linwood G. Dunn =

American special effects pioneer

- Born: December 27, 1904; Brooklyn, New York, U.S.
- Died: May 20, 1998 (aged 93); Los Angeles, California, U.S.
- Occupations: Special effects, cinematographer
- Title: A.S.C.
- Board member of: A.S.C. President (1977–1978)

Linwood G. Dunn, A.S.C. (December 27, 1904 in Brooklyn, New York – May 20, 1998 in Los Angeles, California) was an American pioneer of visual special effects in motion pictures and an inventor of related technology. Dunn worked on many films and television series, including the original 1933 King Kong (1933), Citizen Kane (1941), and Star Trek (1966–69).

== Early career ==
Dunn is noted as being very interested in cinema from as early as age 14, going so far as to compile his own rating scale for the movies he watched. This interest initiated his career, which began in 1923 in his home state as a projectionist. He was hired as an assistant camera operator by the Pathé company in 1925 and eventually moved to Hollywood, where he continued to work for Pathé until 1929.

His early contributions in this capacity were for film serials such as The Green Archer (1925), Snowed In (1926), Hawk of the Hills (1927), and Queen of the Northwoods (1929). He was then hired by RKO Radio Pictures as a cinematographer and as head of the photographic effects department, where he would work from the late 1920s until 1956.

His early contributions in camera work and special effects at RKO included films such as The Case of Sergeant Grischa (1930), Danger Lights (1930), and Cimarron (1931), an Academy Award-winner for Best Picture, and The Monkey's Paw (1933). This early experience led to the World War II development of the first practical commercially manufactured optical printer, a device consisting of cameras and projectors allowing for the accurate compositing of multiple images onto a single piece of film.

== Body of work ==
Dunn photographed the rotating RKO radio tower trademark used at the beginning of all RKO films. In the early 1930s, Dunn became part of the effects team responsible for the creation of the original King Kong (1933). He advanced his special effects techniques through extensive cutting between a miniature Kong model in full shots and fully-scaled body parts in close-ups, a technique he would repeat for later movies, including the sequel, Son of Kong (1933). Dunn worked under model animator Willis O'Brien and would go on to work with O'Brien on other projects.

Dunn did optical/photographic composites for the airplane-wing-dance sequence in the first Astaire-Rodgers musical Flying Down to Rio (1933). The Hunchback of Notre Dame (1939) and Orson Welles' Citizen Kane (1941) were other well-remembered RKO films on which Dunn worked before America entered the second world war. In Citizen Kane, Dunn's composites open the film and many of cinematographer Gregg Toland's deep-focus shots utilize Dunn's skill for creating optical composites. For Bringing Up Baby (1938), separate footage of Cary Grant, Katharine Hepburn, and a leopard were photographically combined by Dunn. Dunn's work became so highly sought after by other studios that he formed his own company, Film Effects of Hollywood, in 1946. He served as the company's president until 1980, working that business at the same time as working at RKO. Eventually, Dunn sold his company to Francis Ford Coppola, who absorbed it into Zoetrope.

Production on The Outlaw (1943) was halted owing to a controversy over how much of Jane Russell's bosom would be visible. Dunn resolved the situation by rephotographing Russell's close-ups with a tiny scrim inserted between the projector and camera, so as to soften the line of her cleavage. Dunn gained a technical Oscar (along with machinist Cecil Love) in 1944 for his work. Dunn continued to work at RKO after Howard Hughes bought the studio.

After RKO had ceased to exist as a film production company, Dunn did the optical composites and title sequence for West Side Story (1961) and the elaborate fire-ladder sequence at the end of Stanley Kramer's It's a Mad, Mad, Mad, Mad World (1963), which required 21 different all-color elements to be composited into final images.

Other later large-format and/or high-profile films Dunn's company did opticals for are My Fair Lady (1964), The Great Race (1965), Hawaii (1966), The Bible: In the Beginning... (1966), Darling Lili (1970), and Airport (1970).

In some cases, his work was not given credit. For example, he was consulted for the special effects in The Exorcist (1973), and numerous correspondences indicate his role in the production of the movie. His contributions to this movie include several stylistic choices that display the demonic possession of Regan MacNeil, including levitation and facial transformations.

== Inventions and innovations ==
During World War II, Dunn developed the Acme-Dunn optical printer to be mass-produced out of a request from the United States' military. The printer was revolutionary in both the production process and the post-production process, as it had numerous capabilities. For example, it was used at the end of Citizen Kane for a final zoom-in shot of Rosebud, the sled, and in Hawaii for shooting against a blue background and adding in details, such as rocks and water, after the shooting was complete.

Dunn produced the lightning-electrocution scene at the end of The Thing from Another World (1951) by scratching the lightning, frame-by-frame, on a strip of black film and then compositing the best of that footage with live action footage of the monster burning and shrinking (done by Dunn via pulling back the camera on a track while filming the monster image element against a black background), with those two elements then photographically combined with the unmoving image of the floor and walls that surround the creature in the final composite. During the brief 3D movie craze and the more permanent shift to widescreen processes such as CinemaScope, Dunn pioneered the use of optical composites using these developments, inventing and refining new equipment to achieve it.

Dunn worked for Desilu Productions, founded by Desi Arnaz and Lucille Ball, and the TV production required the occasional use of optical effects, especially for increasingly elaborate title sequences, and Dunn's Film Effects of Hollywood was one of several optical houses that supplied them. From 1965, Dunn became one of four optical houses that supplied visual effects for the company's (later Paramount) Star Trek. It was mostly Dunn who photographed the 11-foot large Starship Enterprise model, designed by series creator Gene Roddenberry and Matt Jefferies and built by Dick Datin, Mel Keys, Venon Sion, and Volmer Jensen at Production Model Shop in Burbank, California. Dunn also generated footage that could be used by the three other optical houses involved with Star Trek—the Howard Anderson Company, Westheimer Company, and Van Der Veer Photo Effects—all necessary due to the large number of effects shots and tight weekly production schedule. Dunn continued to work on the series until its cancellation in 1969.

Dunn also specialized in optical work for special and large format films, creating the equipment necessary to do the jobs. In fact, he was the first person to blow up a film from 16mm to 35mm color internegative. Dunn did optical composite for several special 70mm films shown at World's Fairs, including the multi-panel tour-de-force film A Place to Stand, made for Expo 67. It was Dunn who did what his associates said was impossible, cleanly blowing up 16mm negative to 70mm prints for George Harrison's Concert For Bangladesh. Dunn's company later became the first facility in Hollywood that could do optical composites in the ultra-large IMAX film format.

He co-wrote (with George Turner) a book on his career and the history of visual effects, The ASC Treasury of Visual Effects published in 1983.

In the 1990s, while in his 90s, Dunn joined with Japanese engineers in the development of a 3D television system that used electronic dual-polarized glasses that auto-synced to the TV image, to create the most clear and deep 3D images ever produced. The system was originally built for hospitals. Surgeons in many facilities are now using the system as a key aid in sorting out the nerve-endings during micro-neurosurgery. A consumer version of the system is now sold with 3D Blu-ray players and TV sets in most video equipment stores. The system was profiled on an episode of Alan Alda's TV series Scientific American Frontiers. Always keenly interested in technology, Dunn participated in the development of digital projection for theaters.

== Honors and awards ==
Dunn was first recognized for his optical printer in 1944 with a citation of technical excellence from the Motion Picture Academy and later was recognized in 1980 by the academy with an Oscar in technical merit.

Dunn was the recipient of the Golden Hugo from the 8th Annual Chicago International Film Festival, was given an honorary Doctor of Fine Arts degree by the San Francisco Art Institute, and received several similar awards from various arts and technical colleges, and other technical organizations.

Dunn shared an Oscar win for special effects in 1949 for his work in collaboration with Willis O'Brien for the original Mighty Joe Young. In 1984, he received the Gordon E. Sawyer Award from the Academy of Motion Picture Arts and Sciences, as well as Honorary Membership in The Society of Motion Picture and Television Engineers—their highest honor.

Twice elected president of the American Society of Cinematographers, he was also elected a governor of the Academy of Motion Picture Arts and Sciences in two different branches, and was instrumental in the formation of the academy's Visual Effects branch. He also served as the AMPAS's treasurer for one several-year term.

The Linwood Dunn Theater at the academy's Pickford Center for Motion Picture Study in Hollywood was named in honor of Dunn and his innovations and contributions to the film industry. The moving image collection of Linwood Dunn is held at the Academy Film Archive.

== Death ==
After winning two final special achievement Oscars in 1979 and 1985, Dunn lived in his North Hollywood home until his death in 1998 at age 93.

=== Academy Awards ===
- 1944 (17th) for the Acme-Dunn Optical Printer
- 1949 (22nd) for Mighty Joe Young - RKO Productions
- 1978 (51st) in appreciation for outstanding service and dedication in upholding the high standards of the Academy of Motion Picture Arts and Sciences
- 1980 (53rd) for the concept, engineering and development of the Acme-Dunn Optical Printer for motion picture special effects.
- 1984 (57th) Gordon E. Sawyer Award
