= Schüfftan process =

Cinematic special effect

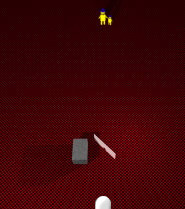
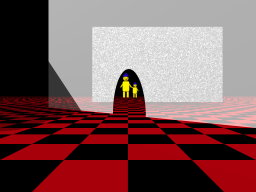
Setup of the Schüfftan process. In the left diagram, a camera (at the bottom of the diagram) is pointed towards a mirror reflecting a small stone block to its left; through a small archway cut in the mirror, distant actors can be seen. The right-hand diagram shows the view from the camera's perspective: the two figures appear to be standing in an archway in an enormous stone block.

The Schüfftan process is a special effect in filmmaking named after its inventor, German cinematographer Eugen Schüfftan (1893–1977). The technique consists of covering part of the camera's view with a mirror, allowing filmmakers to assemble an image from multiple parts. It was widely used in the first half of the 20th century.

First popularized in the 1927 film Metropolis, this technique involved positioning a plate of glass at a 45-degree angle between the camera and the miniatures, outlining the area where actors would be inserted, and transferring this outline to a mirror. The process is similar to "Pepper's ghost", a 19th century stage technique. It was used in numerous films, including works by Alfred Hitchcock and Peter Jackson, but the Schüfftan process has largely been replaced by matte shots and chroma key.

== Application ==
The process was refined and popularized by the German cinematographer Eugen Schüfftan while he was working on the film Metropolis (1927), although there is evidence that other film-makers were using similar techniques earlier than this. The film's director, Fritz Lang, wanted to insert the actors into shots of miniatures of skyscrapers and other buildings, so Schüfftan used a specially made mirror to create the illusion of actors interacting with huge, realistic-looking sets.

Schüfftan placed a plate of glass at a 45-degree angle between the camera and the miniature buildings. He used the camera's viewfinder to trace an outline of the area into which the actors would later be inserted onto the glass. This outline was transferred onto a mirror and all the reflective surface that fell outside the outline was removed, leaving transparent glass. When the mirror was placed in the same position as the original plate of glass, the reflective part blocked a portion of the miniature building behind it and also reflected the stage behind the camera. The actors were placed several meters away from the mirror so that when they were reflected in the mirror, they would appear at the right size.

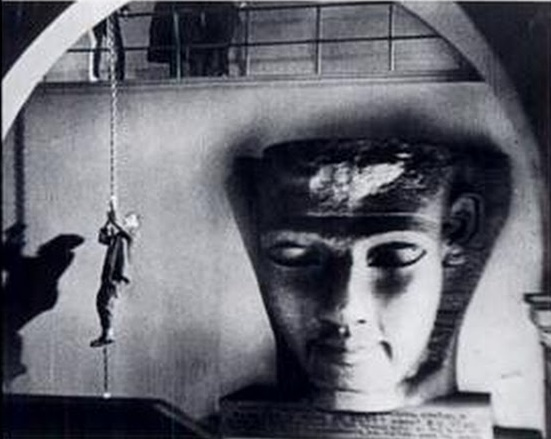
Hitchcock used the Schüfftan process for scenes that took place in the British Museum in his film Blackmail

In the same film, Schüfftan used a variation of this process so that the miniature set (or drawing) was shown on the reflective part of the mirror and the actors were filmed through the transparent part.

Over the following years, the Schüfftan process was used by many other film-makers, including Alfred Hitchcock, in his films Blackmail (1929) and The 39 Steps (1935), and as recently as The Lord of the Rings: The Return of the King (2003), directed by Peter Jackson. The Schüfftan process has largely been replaced with matte shots, which allow the two portions of the image to be filmed at different times and give opportunities for more changes in post production.

The Schüfftan process's use of mirrors is very similar to the 19th century stage technique known as Pepper's ghost.

== See also ==
- Bipack
- Optical printer
