= Optical printer =

Type of film camera

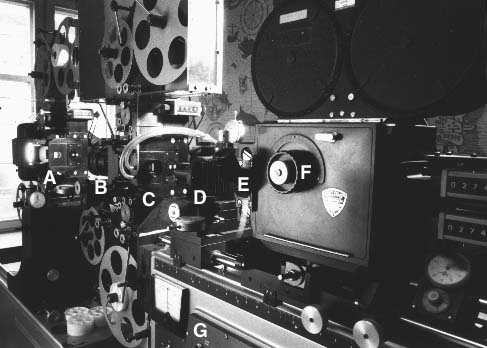
A 35 mm optical printer with two projector heads, used in producing movie special effects. Starting from the left, light is shining from the lamp house, then at A is the first projector's film gate, at B a lens that projects the film in A onto the second projector's gate C. At D is the lens of the camera, the camera's finder is at E and the adjustable shutter control at F. The heavy base G contains all the electronics needed for controlling the printer.

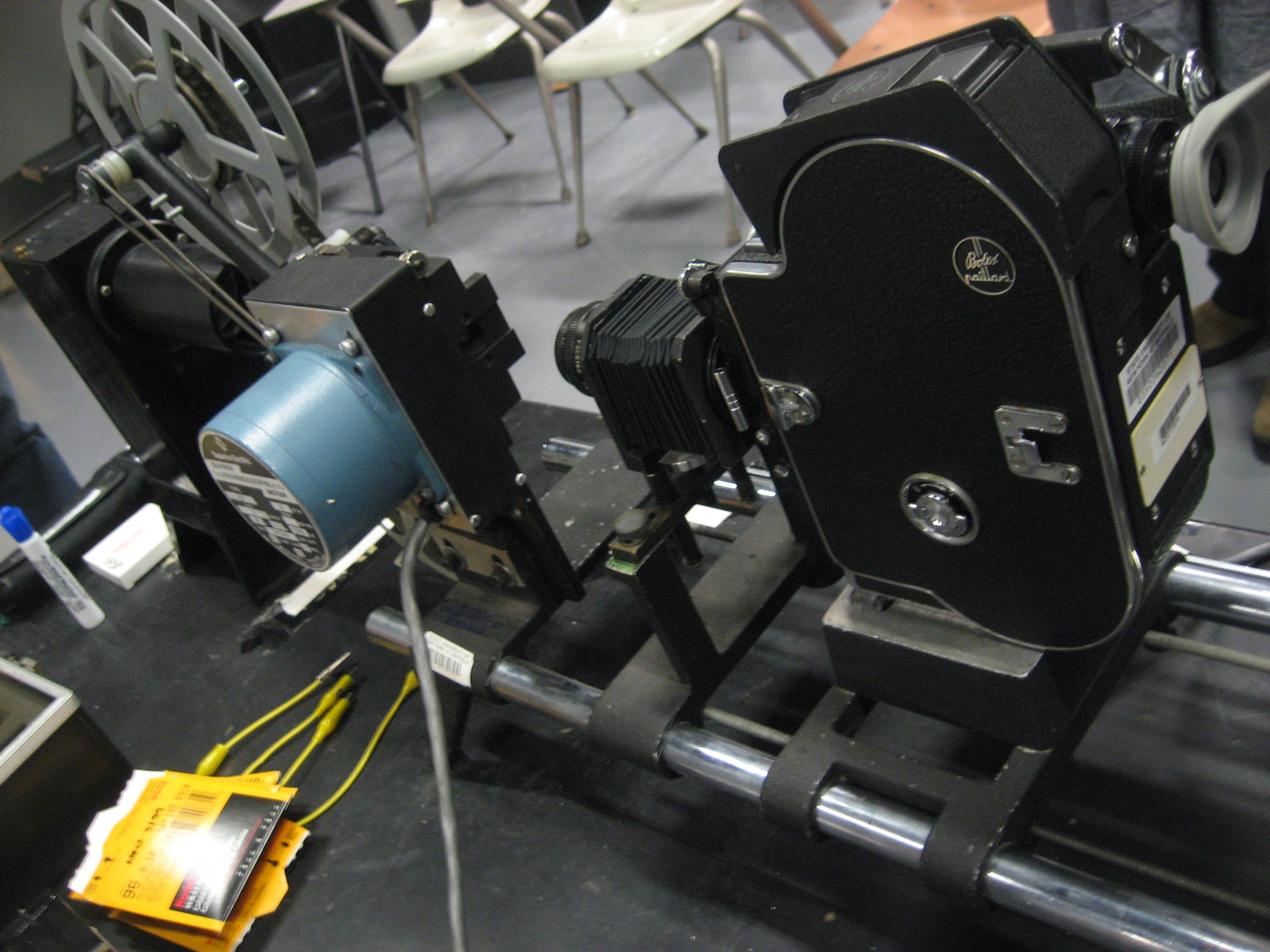
Inexpensive J-K 16 mm optical printer using a Bolex camera.

An optical printer is a device consisting of one or more film projectors mechanically linked to a movie camera. It allows filmmakers to re-photograph one or more strips of film. The optical printer is used for making visual effects for motion pictures, or for copying and restoring film material.

Common optical effects include fade outs and fade ins, dissolves, slow motion, fast motion, and matte work. More complicated work can involve dozens of elements, all combined into a single scene.

== History ==
The first commercially available, although not mass produced, optical printer appeared in 1927 and was called the Depue & Vance Daylight Optical Printer. It was mainly used to reduce standard prints to 16mm and allowed for operation without a darkroom except for loading the positive film magazine. In 1918, the cinematographer Carl Gregory came upon a printer made by G. J. Badgley of New York, designed to produce copies of a standard film using domestic size film stock. Realizing the potential for news productions and special effects, he started designing his own optical printer meant for movie effects. Finished in 1928, and built by Fred A. Barber, it could be used in 16 different ways, like alongside fades, superimposition and multiple exposures. Linwood G. Dunn expanded the concept in the 1930s by creating an optical printer that eliminated the necessity to create optical effects in the camera, and which was used in King Kong. These first optical printers had to be individually developed by each movie studio. During World War II he was commissioned by the United States armed forces' photographic units to design an optical printer that could be ordered as a stock item like a camera. Named the Acme-Dunn optical printer, it had several new features compared to its predecessors, but was not made commercially available for the movie industry after the war.

Development continued well into the 1980s, when the printers were now controlled using minicomputers. Prime examples of optical printing work include the matte work in Star Wars (1977), RoboCop (1987) and The Addams Family (1991). The film Who Framed Roger Rabbit (1988) involved over 1,000 shots that required optical printers, due to the film's combination of live action and cartoon elements. Some shots, such as those featuring Jessica Rabbit, involved as many as thirty layers of film.

At Lucasfilm, the Graphics Group was working to come up with a digital version of the optical printer. They invented the Pixar Image Computer, which could both handle digital compositing and simulate analog effects, while David DiFrancesco developed a laser scanner that could transfer the images from the computer to film. In the late 80s, the digital compositing had begun to supplant optical effects. By the mid-nineties, computer graphics had evolved to rival and surpass what was possible with optical printers, and many now consider optical printing all but obsolete. Improvements in film scanners and recorders allow for a complete feature film to be processed by computers, have special effects applied, and then be processed back to film.

Today, optical printing is mostly used as an artistic tool by experimental film makers, for educational purposes, or for photochemical (as opposed to digital) film restoration. As a technique, it is particularly useful for making copies of hand painted or physically manipulated film.

== Artifacts ==
As in any analog process, every re-printing degrades the picture, just like a photocopy of a photocopy. Properly performed contact printing generally creates less degradation provided that the contact between the negative and the print film is perfect. Optical printing can emphasize the grain structure and any imperfections in the negative. Also, since a new, different piece of film was exposed and printed, matching the exact colors of the original was a problem. Often the printer work was limited to only the parts of a dissolve needing the effect. The original footage was spliced mid-shot with the optically printed portion, often resulting in an obvious change in image quality when the transition occurs.

Other problematic artifacts depend on the effect attempted, most often alignment inaccuracies in matte work. For this reason, shots intended to be manipulated via optical printer were often shot on larger film formats than the rest of the project. Otherwise obsolete formats, such as VistaVision, remained in use for many years after they had been abandoned for the conventional shooting of scenes because their larger frame size provided greater clarity, reduced grain size when reprinted and any alignment problems were not as conspicuous.

== Restoration printing ==
Optical printers have often been used in the recovery of older, damaged film stock which includes the 1989 restoration of Intolerance (1916).

Scratches, abrasions, cinch marks caused by rewinding a film too tightly, and other blemishes are a common problem with films that are candidates for restoration. Most of these scratches are in the back side of the film in the transparent substrate that forms the film base, rather than in the photographic emulsion on the front that holds the film's actual image. In the normal process of duplicating a film in an optical printer, collimated light passes through the film base on its way to illuminate the emulsion. Any scratches, abrasions, etc., in the film base cause the light to bend such that the duplicated film ends up with bright or dark (depending on whether copying from a negative or positive original) copies of the scratches. This bending of the light is being caused by the difference in the refraction index of the substrate and the air.

If these scratches and abrasions can be prevented from being captured on the new print, it eliminates one entire area of restoration work. Three methods address this problem. First, one can simply enlarge the portion of the film not damaged. This mainly has application where the damage is confined to the edges.

The second method is wet-gate printing. The "gate" in a projector is the apparatus that holds the film in place as each frame is shown. A wet gate is filled with a fluid that coats the film as it is fed through, constantly replenishing the fluid as needed.

Wet gate printing eliminates the refraction itself by filling in the gouges in the substrate with a fluid such as perchloroethene that shares approximately the same refractive index as the substrate. With the fluid temporarily displacing the air in the scratches and abrasions, refraction simply no longer occurs, so the defects are not reflected on the new copy. The light used is fully collimated, as with standard optical printing, and the film is undamaged by the process. This method does not work if the scratches on the emulsion side are deep enough to have removed some of the silver or dye image in the original film.

The third method involves inserting a diffusion filter in the path from the collimated light source to the film. It can eliminate the projection of small defects on the back side of the film onto the new copy because the light, rather than arriving at the back of the film in perfect parallel lines, instead enters the scratch from several directions. It is therefore still diffuse when it exits, ensuring an image of the scratch will not show up as strongly on the new print. (Only the desired image on the surface of the emulsion ends up being captured in focus.) This method results in the most finely focused capture of the original. However, it cannot remove deep scratches, and is thus less effective than wet gate printing.

== See also ==
- Bipack
- Rear projection
- Schüfftan process
