= Academy Award for Best Visual Effects =

Academy Award given for the best achievement in visual effects

- Country: United States
- Presented by: Academy of Motion Picture Arts and Sciences (AMPAS)
- Formerly called: Engineering Effects (1929); Best Special Effects (1939–1964); Best Special Visual Effects (1965–1972)
- First award: May 16, 1929; 97 years ago (for films released during the 1927/1928 film season)
- Most recent winner: Joe Letteri, Richard Baneham, Eric Saindon and Daniel Barrett; Avatar: Fire and Ash (2025)

Highlights
- Most awards: Industrial Light & Magic (15) / Dennis Muren (8)
- Most nominations: Dennis Muren (15)
- Website: oscars.org

The Academy Award for Best Visual Effects is presented annually by the Academy of Motion Picture Arts and Sciences (AMPAS) for the best achievement in visual effects. It has been handed to four members of the team directly responsible for creating the film's visual effects since 1980.

== History ==
The Academy of Motion Picture Arts and Sciences first recognized the technical contributions of special effects to movies at its inaugural dinner in 1929, presenting a plaque for "Best Engineering Effects" to the first Best Picture Oscar winner, the World War I flying drama Wings.

Producer David O. Selznick, then production head at RKO Studios, petitioned the Academy Board of Governors to recognize the work of animator Willis O'Brien for his groundbreaking work on 1933's King Kong. However, the Academy did not have a category to acknowledge its visual achievements at the time.

It was not until 1938 when a film was actually recognized for its effects work, when a "Special Achievement Award for Special Effects" was given to the Paramount film Spawn of the North. The following year, "Best Special Effects" became a recognized category, although on occasion the Academy has chosen to honor a single film outright rather than nominate two or more films. From 1939 to 1963, it was an award for a film's visual effects as well as audio effects, so it was often given to two persons, although some years only one or the other type of effect was recognized. For the 22nd Academy Awards, RKO was nominated for the work done on Mighty Joe Young (1949), and when they won, it was Willis H. O'Brien who went on stage to accept the statue. In 1964, it was given only for visual effects, and the following year the name of the category was changed to "Best Special Visual Effects".

Honorees for this award have been bestowed several times as a Special Achievement Academy Award. In 1977, the category was given its current name "Best Visual Effects." For decades, shortlisted finalists were selected by a steering committee. They are presently chosen by the visual effects branch executive committee. 1990 was the last year there were no official nominees. Back to the Future Part III, Dick Tracy, Ghost and Total Recall advanced to a second stage of voting, but only Total Recall received a requisite average and it was given a special achievement Oscar.

There have been three wholly animated films nominated in this category: The Nightmare Before Christmas in 1993, Kubo and the Two Strings in 2016, and The Lion King in 2019. There have been three semi-animated films nominated, which also won: Mary Poppins in 1964, Bedknobs and Broomsticks in 1971, and Who Framed Roger Rabbit in 1988. In 2024, Godzilla Minus One became the first non-English-language film ever to win in the category.

== Rules ==
In 1979, there were five films nominated. For most of the next three decades, there were three nominees a year, although at some times there were two and at others, a single film was given the award outright.

In 2007, it was decided that a list of no more than 15 eligible films would be chosen, from which a maximum of seven would be shortlisted for further consideration. A vote would then proceed, with a maximum of three nominees. Since 2010, there are ten shortlisted finalists which, using a form of range voting, produce five nominees. No more than four people may be nominated for a single film.

According to the official Academy Award rules, the criteria are:

(a) consideration of the contribution the visual effects make to the overall production and
(b) the artistry, skill and fidelity with which the visual illusions are achieved.

== Filmmakers ==
A number of filmmakers have had their movies honored for their achievements in visual effects; i.e., seven by director James Cameron (who began his career in Hollywood as an effects technician), five films produced by George Pal, five by director/producer George Lucas, four by directors Richard Fleischer, Steven Spielberg and Peter Jackson, three by directors Robert Zemeckis, Christopher Nolan, and Denis Villeneuve, and two by directors Clarence Brown, Cecil B. DeMille, Mark Robson, Ridley Scott, Robert Stevenson.

Only three film directors have won in the same category: Four time Best Director nominee Stanley Kubrick's only Oscar win for 1968's 2001: A Space Odyssey, Best Animated Short Film-winning Canadian-British animator Richard Williams's first Oscar category win for 1988 Zemeckis's Who Framed Roger Rabbit (although he served as an animation director of the film, he did direct the then-unfinished magnum opus The Thief and the Cobbler), and Japanese filmmaker Takashi Yamazaki's first Oscar win for 2023's Godzilla Minus One.

=== Kubrick's 2001 visual effects contributors controversy ===
The credits for 2001 list four effects contributors, including Douglas Trumbull. However, according to the rules of the Academy in effect at the time, only three persons could be nominated for their work on a single film, which would have resulted in the omission of either Trumbull, Tom Howard, Con Pederson or Wally Veevers. Ultimately, it was Kubrick's name that was submitted as a nominee in this category, resulting in his winning the award, which many consider a slight to the four men whose work contributed to the film's success.

== Engineering Effects Award ==
The table below display the Oscar nominees for Best Engineering Effects.

indicates competitive winner
indicates non-competitive winner

=== 1920s ===
| Year | Film | Nominees |
|---|---|---|
| 1927–28 (1st) | Wings | Roy Pomeroy |
| 1927–28 (1st) | Ralph Hammeras (photographic) (Note: The nomination for Ralph Hammeras was not associated with any individual film.) | |
| 1927–28 (1st) | Nugent Slaughter (photographic) (Note: According to the Academy's in-house records, the nomination for Nugent Slaughter was most often connected with The Jazz Singer. It is not considered an official nomination for that film.) | |

== Special Effects Awards ==
The tables below display the Oscar nominees for Best Special Effects including the recipients of the Special Achievement Awards.

=== 1930s ===
| Year | Film | Nominees |
|---|---|---|
| 1938 (11th) | Spawn of the North (Note: This was presented as a Special Achievement Award, not as a competitive Academy Award of Merit.) | For outstanding achievement in creating Special Photographic and Sound Effects in the Paramount production Spawn of the North. Special Effects by Gordon Jennings, assisted by Jan Domela, Dev Jennings, Irmin Roberts and Art Smith. Transparencies by Farciot Edouart, assisted by Loyal Griggs. Sound Effects by Loren Ryder, assisted by Harry Mills, Louis Mesenkop and Walter Oberst. |
| 1939 (12th) (Note: From 1939 until 1962, visual effects and sound effects artists competed in a combined Best Special Effects category.) | The Rains Came | Fred Sersen (photographic); E. H. Hansen (sound) |
| 1939 (12th) | Gone with the Wind | Jack Cosgrove (photographic); Fred Albin and Arthur Johns (sound) |
| 1939 (12th) | Only Angels Have Wings | Roy Davidson (photographic); Edwin C. Hahn (sound) |
| 1939 (12th) | The Private Lives of Elizabeth and Essex | Byron Haskin (photographic); Nathan Levinson (sound) |
| 1939 (12th) | Topper Takes a Trip | Roy Seawright (photographic) |
| 1939 (12th) | Union Pacific | Farciot Edouart and Gordon Jennings (photographic); Loren Ryder (sound) |
| 1939 (12th) | The Wizard of Oz | A. Arnold Gillespie (photographic); Douglas Shearer (sound) |

=== 1940s ===
| Year | Film | Nominees |
|---|---|---|
| 1940 (13th) | The Thief of Bagdad | Lawrence Butler (photographic); Jack Whitney (sound) |
| 1940 (13th) | The Blue Bird | Fred Sersen (photographic); E. H. Hansen (sound) |
| 1940 (13th) | Boom Town | A. Arnold Gillespie (photographic); Douglas Shearer (sound) |
| 1940 (13th) | The Boys from Syracuse | John P. Fulton (photographic); Bernard B. Brown and Joseph Lapis (sound) |
| 1940 (13th) | Dr. Cyclops | Gordon Jennings and Farciot Edouart (photographic) |
| 1940 (13th) | Foreign Correspondent | Paul Eagler (photographic); Thomas T. Moulton (sound) |
| 1940 (13th) | The Invisible Man Returns | John P. Fulton (photographic); Bernard B. Brown and William Hedgcock (sound) |
| 1940 (13th) | The Long Voyage Home | R. T. Layton and Ray Binger (photographic); Thomas T. Moulton (sound) |
| 1940 (13th) | One Million B.C. | Roy Seawright (photographic); Elmer Raguse (sound) |
| 1940 (13th) | Rebecca | Jack Cosgrove (photographic); Arthur Johns (sound) |
| 1940 (13th) | The Sea Hawk | Byron Haskin (photographic); Nathan Levinson (sound) |
| 1940 (13th) | Swiss Family Robinson | Vernon L. Walker (photographic); John O. Aalberg (sound) |
| 1940 (13th) | Typhoon | Farciot Edouart and Gordon Jennings (photographic); Loren Ryder (sound) |
| 1940 (13th) | Women in War | Howard J. Lydecker, William Bradford, and Ellis J. Thackery (photographic); Herbert Norsch (sound) |
| 1941 (14th) | I Wanted Wings | Farciot Edouart and Gordon Jennings (photographic); Louis Mesenkop (sound) |
| 1941 (14th) | Aloma of the South Seas | Farciot Edouart and Gordon Jennings (photographic); Louis Mesenkop (sound) |
| 1941 (14th) | ~~Dive Bomber~~ (Note: When nominations were announced on February 9, 1942, Dive Bomber was nominated in place of The Sea Wolf. Both were Warner Bros. productions with photographic effects by Byron Haskin and sound effects by Nathan Levinson. By February 19, the Dive Bomber nomination was replaced with The Sea Wolf. The reason for the substitution is unknown.) | ~~Byron Haskin (photographic); Nathan Levinson (sound)~~ |
| 1941 (14th) | Flight Command | A. Arnold Gillespie (photographic); Douglas Shearer (sound) |
| 1941 (14th) | The Invisible Woman | John Fulton (photographic); John Hall (sound) |
| 1941 (14th) | The Sea Wolf | Byron Haskin (photographic); Nathan Levinson (sound) |
| 1941 (14th) | That Hamilton Woman | Lawrence Butler (photographic); William H. Wilmarth (sound) |
| 1941 (14th) | Topper Returns | Roy Seawright (photographic); Elmer Raguse (sound) |
| 1941 (14th) | A Yank in the R.A.F. | Fred Sersen (photographic); E. H. Hansen (sound) |
| 1942 (15th) | Reap the Wild Wind | Gordon Jennings, Farciot Edouart, and William Pereira (photographic); Louis Mesenkop (sound) |
| 1942 (15th) | The Black Swan | Fred Sersen (photographic); Roger Heman and George Leverett (sound) |
| 1942 (15th) | Desperate Journey | Byron Haskin (photographic); Nathan Levinson (sound) |
| 1942 (15th) | Flying Tigers | Howard Lydecker (photographic); Daniel J. Bloomberg (sound) |
| 1942 (15th) | Invisible Agent | John Fulton (photographic); Bernard B. Brown (sound) |
| 1942 (15th) | Jungle Book | Lawrence Butler (photographic); William H. Wilmarth (sound) |
| 1942 (15th) | Mrs. Miniver | A. Arnold Gillespie and Warren Newcombe (photographic); Douglas Shearer (sound) |
| 1942 (15th) | The Navy Comes Through | Vernon L. Walker (photographic); James G. Stewart (sound) |
| 1942 (15th) | One of Our Aircraft Is Missing | Ronald Neame (photographic); C. C. Stevens (sound) |
| 1942 (15th) | The Pride of the Yankees | Jack Cosgrove and Ray Binger (photographic); Thomas T. Moulton (sound) |
| 1943 (16th) | Crash Dive | Fred Sersen (photographic); Roger Heman (sound) |
| 1943 (16th) | Air Force | Hans Koenekamp and Rex Wimpy (photographic); Nathan Levinson (sound) |
| 1943 (16th) | Bombardier | Vernon L. Walker (photographic); James G. Stewart and Roy Granville (sound) |
| 1943 (16th) | The North Star | Clarence Slifer and Ray Binger (photographic); Thomas T. Moulton (sound) |
| 1943 (16th) | So Proudly We Hail! | Gordon Jennings and Farciot Edouart (photographic); George Dutton (sound) |
| 1943 (16th) | Stand By for Action | A. Arnold Gillespie and Donald Jahraus (photographic); Michael Steinore (sound) |
| 1944 (17th) | Thirty Seconds Over Tokyo | A. Arnold Gillespie, Donald Jahraus, and Warren Newcombe (photographic); Douglas Shearer (sound) |
| 1944 (17th) | The Adventures of Mark Twain | Paul Detlefsen and John Crouse (photographic); Nathan Levinson (sound) |
| 1944 (17th) | Days of Glory | Vernon L. Walker (photographic); James G. Stewart and Roy Granville (sound) |
| 1944 (17th) | Secret Command | David Allen, Ray Cory, and Robert Wright (photographic); Russell Malmgren and Harry Kusnick (sound) |
| 1944 (17th) | Since You Went Away | Jack Cosgrove (photographic); Arthur Johns (sound) |
| 1944 (17th) | The Story of Dr. Wassell | Farciot Edouart and Gordon Jennings (photographic); George Dutton (sound) |
| 1944 (17th) | Wilson | Fred Sersen (photographic); Roger Heman (sound) |
| 1945 (18th) | Wonder Man | John P. Fulton (photographic); Arthur Johns (sound) |
| 1945 (18th) | Captain Eddie | Fred Sersen and Sol Halperin (photographic); Roger Heman and Harry Leonard (sound) |
| 1945 (18th) | Spellbound | Jack Cosgrove (photographic) |
| 1945 (18th) | They Were Expendable | A. Arnold Gillespie, Donald Jahraus, and Robert A. MacDonald (photographic); Michael Steinore (sound) |
| 1945 (18th) | A Thousand and One Nights | Lawrence W. Butler (photographic); Ray Bomba (sound) |
| 1946 (19th) | Blithe Spirit | Thomas Howard (visual) |
| 1946 (19th) | A Stolen Life | William McGann (visual); Nathan Levinson (audible) |
| 1947 (20th) | Green Dolphin Street | A. Arnold Gillespie and Warren Newcombe (visual); Douglas Shearer and Michael Steinore (audible) |
| 1947 (20th) | Unconquered | Farciot Edouart, Devereux Jennings, Gordon Jennings, W. Wallace Kelley, and Paul Lerpae (visual); George Dutton (audible) |
| 1948 (21st) | Portrait of Jennie | Paul Eagler, Joseph McMillan Johnson, Russell Shearman, and Clarence Slifer (visual); Charles Freeman, and James G. Stewart (audible) |
| 1948 (21st) | Deep Waters | Ralph Hammeras, Fred Sersen, and Edward Snyder (visual); Roger Heman (audible) |
| 1949 (22nd) | Mighty Joe Young | RKO Productions |
| 1949 (22nd) | Tulsa | Walter Wanger Pictures |

=== 1950s ===
| Year | Film | Nominees |
|---|---|---|
| 1950 (23rd) | Destination Moon | George Pal Productions |
| 1950 (23rd) | Samson and Delilah | Cecil B. DeMille Productions |
| 1951 (24th) | When Worlds Collide | Paramount |
| 1952 (25th) | Plymouth Adventure | Metro-Goldwyn-Mayer |
| 1953 (26th) | The War of the Worlds | Paramount Studio |
| 1954 (27th) | 20,000 Leagues Under the Sea | John Hench, Joshua Meador and Walt Disney Studios |
| 1954 (27th) | Hell and High Water | 20th Century-Fox Studio |
| 1954 (27th) | Them! | Warner Bros. Studio |
| 1955 (28th) | The Bridges at Toko-Ri | Paramount Studio |
| 1955 (28th) | The Dam Busters | Associated British Picture Corporation, Ltd. |
| 1955 (28th) | The Rains of Ranchipur | 20th Century-Fox Studio |
| 1956 (29th) | The Ten Commandments | John P. Fulton |
| 1956 (29th) | Forbidden Planet | A. Arnold Gillespie, Irving G. Ries, and Wesley C. Miller |
| 1957 (30th) | The Enemy Below (Note: In 1957, The Enemy Below won the Best Special Effects Oscar for audible effects by Walter Rossi. It was not cited for its visual effects.) | Walter Rossi (audible) |
| 1957 (30th) | The Spirit of St. Louis | Louis Lichtenfield (visual) |
| 1958 (31st) | Tom Thumb | Tom Howard (visual) |
| 1958 (31st) | Torpedo Run | A. Arnold Gillespie (visual); Harold Humbrock (audible) |
| 1959 (32nd) | Ben-Hur | A. Arnold Gillespie and Robert MacDonald (visual); Milo B. Lory (audible) |
| 1959 (32nd) | Journey to the Center of the Earth | L. B. Abbott and James B. Gordon (visual); Carl Faulkner (audible) |

=== 1960s ===
| Year | Film | Nominees |
|---|---|---|
| 1960 (33rd) | The Time Machine | Gene Warren and Tim Baar (visual) |
| 1960 (33rd) | The Last Voyage | Augie Lohman (visual) |
| 1961 (34th) | The Guns of Navarone | Bill Warrington (visual); Vivian C. Greenham (audible) |
| 1961 (34th) | The Absent-Minded Professor | Robert A. Mattey and Eustace Lycett (visual) |
| 1962 (35th) | The Longest Day | Robert MacDonald (visual); Jacques Maumont (audible) |
| 1962 (35th) | Mutiny on the Bounty | A. Arnold Gillespie (visual); Milo B. Lory (audible) |

== Visual Effects Awards ==
The tables below display the Oscar nominees for Best Visual Effects including the recipients of the Special Achievement Awards.

=== 1960s ===
| Year | Film | Nominees |
|---|---|---|
| 1963 (36th) | Cleopatra | Emil Kosa Jr. |
| 1963 (36th) | The Birds | Ub Iwerks |
| 1964 (37th) | Mary Poppins | Peter Ellenshaw, Eustace Lycett, and Hamilton Luske |
| 1964 (37th) | 7 Faces of Dr. Lao | Jim Danforth |
| 1965 (38th) | Thunderball | John Stears |
| 1965 (38th) | The Greatest Story Ever Told | Joseph McMillan Johnson |
| 1966 (39th) | Fantastic Voyage | Art Cruickshank |
| 1966 (39th) | Hawaii | Linwood G. Dunn |
| 1967 (40th) | Doctor Dolittle | L. B. Abbott |
| 1967 (40th) | Tobruk | Howard A. Anderson Jr. and Albert Whitlock |
| 1968 (41st) | 2001: A Space Odyssey | Stanley Kubrick |
| 1968 (41st) | Ice Station Zebra | Hal Millar and Joseph McMillan Johnson |
| 1969 (42nd) | Marooned | Robbie Robertson |
| 1969 (42nd) | Krakatoa, East of Java | Eugène Lourié and Alex Weldon |

=== 1970s ===
| Year | Film | Nominees |
|---|---|---|
| 1970 (43rd) | Tora! Tora! Tora! | A. D. Flowers and L. B. Abbott |
| 1970 (43rd) | Patton | Alex Weldon |
| 1971 (44th) | Bedknobs and Broomsticks | Alan Maley, Eustace Lycett, and Danny Lee |
| 1971 (44th) | When Dinosaurs Ruled the Earth | Jim Danforth and Roger Dicken |
| 1972 (45th) | The Poseidon Adventure | L. B. Abbott and A. D. Flowers |
| 1974 (47th) | Earthquake | Frank Brendel, Glen Robinson, and Albert Whitlock |
| 1975 (48th) | The Hindenburg | Albert Whitlock and Glen Robinson |
| 1976 (49th) | King Kong | Carlo Rambaldi, Glen Robinson, and Frank Van der Veer |
| 1976 (49th) | Logan's Run | L. B. Abbott, Glen Robinson, and Matthew Yuricich |
| 1977 (50th) | Star Wars | John Stears, John Dykstra, Richard Edlund, Grant McCune, and Robert Blalack |
| 1977 (50th) | Close Encounters of the Third Kind | Roy Arbogast, Douglas Trumbull, Matthew Yuricich, Greg Jein, and Richard Yuricich |
| 1978 (51st) | Superman | Les Bowie, Colin Chilvers, Denys Coop, Roy Field, Derek Meddings, and Zoran Perisic |
| 1979 (52nd) | Alien | H. R. Giger, Carlo Rambaldi, Brian Johnson, Nick Allder, and Dennis Ayling |
| 1979 (52nd) | 1941 | William A. Fraker, A. D. Flowers, and Greg Jein |
| 1979 (52nd) | The Black Hole | Peter Ellenshaw, Art Cruickshank, Eustace Lycett, Danny Lee, Harrison Ellenshaw, and Joe Hale |
| 1979 (52nd) | Moonraker | Derek Meddings, Paul Wilson, and John Evans |
| 1979 (52nd) | Star Trek: The Motion Picture | Douglas Trumbull, John Dykstra, Richard Yuricich, Robert Swarthe, David K. Stewart, and Grant McCune |

=== 1980s ===
| Year | Film | Nominees |
|---|---|---|
| 1980 (53rd) | The Empire Strikes Back | Brian Johnson, Richard Edlund, Dennis Muren, and Bruce Nicholson |
| 1981 (54th) | Raiders of the Lost Ark | Richard Edlund, Kit West, Bruce Nicholson, and Joe Johnston |
| 1981 (54th) | Dragonslayer | Dennis Muren, Phil Tippett, Ken Ralston, and Brian Johnson |
| 1982 (55th) | E.T. the Extra-Terrestrial | Carlo Rambaldi, Dennis Muren, and Kenneth F. Smith |
| 1982 (55th) | Blade Runner | Douglas Trumbull, Richard Yuricich, and David Dryer |
| 1982 (55th) | Poltergeist | Richard Edlund, Michael Wood, and Bruce Nicholson |
| 1983 (56th) | Return of the Jedi | Richard Edlund, Dennis Muren, Ken Ralston, and Phil Tippett |
| 1984 (57th) | Indiana Jones and the Temple of Doom | Dennis Muren, Michael J. McAlister, Lorne Peterson, and George Gibbs |
| 1984 (57th) | 2010 | Richard Edlund, Neil Krepela, George Jenson, and Mark Stetson |
| 1984 (57th) | Ghostbusters | Richard Edlund, John Bruno, Mark Vargo, and Chuck Gaspar |
| 1985 (58th) | Cocoon | Ken Ralston, Ralph McQuarrie, Scott Farrar, and David Berry |
| 1985 (58th) | Return to Oz | Will Vinton, Ian Wingrove, Zoran Perisic, and Michael Lloyd |
| 1985 (58th) | Young Sherlock Holmes | Dennis Muren, Kit West, John R. Ellis, and David W. Allen |
| 1986 (59th) | Aliens | Robert Skotak, Stan Winston, John Richardson, and Suzanne M. Benson |
| 1986 (59th) | Little Shop of Horrors | Lyle Conway, Bran Ferren, and Martin Gutteridge |
| 1986 (59th) | Poltergeist II: The Other Side | Richard Edlund, John Bruno, Garry Waller, and Bill Neil |
| 1987 (60th) | Innerspace | Dennis Muren, William George, Harley Jessup, and Kenneth F. Smith |
| 1987 (60th) | Predator | Joel Hynek, Robert M. Greenberg, Richard Greenberg, and Stan Winston |
| 1988 (61st) | Who Framed Roger Rabbit | Ken Ralston, Richard Williams, Edward Jones, and George Gibbs |
| 1988 (61st) | Die Hard | Richard Edlund, Al DiSarro, Brent Boates, and Thaine Morris |
| 1988 (61st) | Willow | Dennis Muren, Michael J. McAlister, Phil Tippett, and Chris Evans |
| 1989 (62nd) | The Abyss | John Bruno, Dennis Muren, Hoyt Yeatman, and Dennis Skotak |
| 1989 (62nd) | The Adventures of Baron Munchausen | Richard Conway and Kent Houston |
| 1989 (62nd) | Back to the Future Part II | Ken Ralston, Michael Lantieri, John Bell, and Steve Gawley |

=== 1990s ===
| Year | Film | Nominees |
|---|---|---|
| 1990 (63rd) | Total Recall | Eric Brevig, Rob Bottin, Tim McGovern, and Alex Funke |
| 1991 (64th) | Terminator 2: Judgment Day | Dennis Muren, Stan Winston, Gene Warren Jr., and Robert Skotak |
| 1991 (64th) | Backdraft | Mikael Salomon, Allen Hall, Clay Pinney, and Scott Farrar |
| 1991 (64th) | Hook | Eric Brevig, Harley Jessup, Mark Sullivan, and Michael Lantieri |
| 1992 (65th) | Death Becomes Her | Ken Ralston, Doug Chiang, Douglas Smythe, and Tom Woodruff Jr. |
| 1992 (65th) | Alien 3 | Richard Edlund, Alec Gillis, Tom Woodruff Jr., and George Gibbs |
| 1992 (65th) | Batman Returns | Michael L. Fink, Craig Barron, John Bruno, and Dennis Skotak |
| 1993 (66th) | Jurassic Park | Dennis Muren, Stan Winston, Phil Tippett, and Michael Lantieri |
| 1993 (66th) | Cliffhanger | Neil Krepela, John Richardson, John Bruno, and Pamela Easley |
| 1993 (66th) | The Nightmare Before Christmas | Pete Kozachik, Eric Leighton, Ariel Velasco-Shaw, and Gordon Baker |
| 1994 (67th) | Forrest Gump | Ken Ralston, George Murphy, Stephen Rosenbaum, and Allen Hall |
| 1994 (67th) | The Mask | Scott Squires, Steve Williams, Tom Bertino, and Jon Farhat |
| 1994 (67th) | True Lies | John Bruno, Thomas L. Fisher, Jacques Stroweis, and Patrick McClung |
| 1995 (68th) | Babe | Scott E. Anderson, Charles Gibson, Neal Scanlan, and John Cox |
| 1995 (68th) | Apollo 13 | Robert Legato, Michael Kanfer, Leslie Ekker, and Matt Sweeney |
| 1996 (69th) | Independence Day | Volker Engel, Douglas Smith, Clay Pinney, and Joseph Viskocil |
| 1996 (69th) | Dragonheart | Scott Squires, Phil Tippett, James Straus, and Kit West |
| 1996 (69th) | Twister | Stefen Fangmeier, John Frazier, Habib Zargarpour, and Henry LaBounta |
| 1997 (70th) | Titanic | Robert Legato, Mark Lasoff, Thomas L. Fisher, and Michael Kanfer |
| 1997 (70th) | The Lost World: Jurassic Park | Dennis Muren, Stan Winston, Randal M. Dutra, and Michael Lantieri |
| 1997 (70th) | Starship Troopers | Phil Tippett, Scott E. Anderson, Alec Gillis, and John Richardson |
| 1998 (71st) | What Dreams May Come | Joel Hynek, Nicholas Brooks, Stuart Robertson, and Kevin Mack |
| 1998 (71st) | Armageddon | Richard R. Hoover, Patrick McClung, and John Frazier |
| 1998 (71st) | Mighty Joe Young | Rick Baker, Hoyt Yeatman, Allen Hall, and Jim Mitchell |
| 1999 (72nd) | The Matrix | John Gaeta, Janek Sirrs, Steve Courtley, and Jon Thum |
| 1999 (72nd) | Star Wars: Episode I – The Phantom Menace | John Knoll, Dennis Muren, Scott Squires, and Rob Coleman |
| 1999 (72nd) | Stuart Little | John Dykstra, Jerome Chen, Henry F. Anderson III, and Eric Allard |

=== 2000s ===
| Year | Film | Nominees |
|---|---|---|
| 2000 (73rd) | Gladiator | John Nelson, Neil Corbould, Tim Burke, and Rob Harvey |
| 2000 (73rd) | Hollow Man | Scott E. Anderson, Craig Hayes, Scott Stokdyk, and Stan Parks |
| 2000 (73rd) | The Perfect Storm | Stefen Fangmeier, Habib Zargarpour, John Frazier, and Walt Conti |
| 2001 (74th) | The Lord of the Rings: The Fellowship of the Ring | Jim Rygiel, Randall William Cook, Richard Taylor, and Mark Stetson |
| 2001 (74th) | A.I. Artificial Intelligence | Dennis Muren, Scott Farrar, Stan Winston, and Michael Lantieri |
| 2001 (74th) | Pearl Harbor | Eric Brevig, John Frazier, Ed Hirsh, and Ben Snow |
| 2002 (75th) | The Lord of the Rings: The Two Towers | Jim Rygiel, Joe Letteri, Randall William Cook, and Alex Funke |
| 2002 (75th) | Spider-Man | John Dykstra, Scott Stokdyk, Anthony LaMolinara, and John Frazier |
| 2002 (75th) | Star Wars: Episode II – Attack of the Clones | Rob Coleman, Pablo Helman, John Knoll, and Ben Snow |
| 2003 (76th) | The Lord of the Rings: The Return of the King | Jim Rygiel, Joe Letteri, Randall William Cook, and Alex Funke |
| 2003 (76th) | Master and Commander: The Far Side of the World | Dan Sudick, Stefen Fangmeier, Nathan McGuinness, and Robert Stromberg |
| 2003 (76th) | Pirates of the Caribbean: The Curse of the Black Pearl | John Knoll, Hal Hickel, Charles Gibson, and Terry Frazee |
| 2004 (77th) | Spider-Man 2 | John Dykstra, Scott Stokdyk, Anthony LaMolinara, and John Frazier |
| 2004 (77th) | Harry Potter and the Prisoner of Azkaban | Roger Guyett, Tim Burke, John Richardson, and William George |
| 2004 (77th) | I, Robot | John Nelson, Andrew R. Jones, Erik Nash, and Joe Letteri |
| 2005 (78th) | King Kong | Joe Letteri, Brian Van't Hul, Christian Rivers, and Richard Taylor |
| 2005 (78th) | The Chronicles of Narnia: The Lion, the Witch and the Wardrobe | Dean Wright, Bill Westenhofer, Jim Berney, and Scott Farrar |
| 2005 (78th) | War of the Worlds | Dennis Muren, Pablo Helman, Randal M. Dutra, and Dan Sudick |
| 2006 (79th) | Pirates of the Caribbean: Dead Man's Chest | John Knoll, Hal Hickel, Charles Gibson, and Allen Hall |
| 2006 (79th) | Poseidon | Boyd Shermis, Kim Libreri, Chas Jarrett, and John Frazier |
| 2006 (79th) | Superman Returns | Mark Stetson, Neil Corbould, Richard R. Hoover, and Jon Thum |
| 2007 (80th) | The Golden Compass | Michael L. Fink, Bill Westenhofer, Ben Morris, and Trevor Wood |
| 2007 (80th) | Pirates of the Caribbean: At World's End | John Knoll, Hal Hickel, Charles Gibson, and John Frazier |
| 2007 (80th) | Transformers | Scott Farrar, Scott Benza, Russell Earl, and John Frazier |
| 2008 (81st) | The Curious Case of Benjamin Button | Eric Barba, Steve Preeg, Burt Dalton, and Craig Barron |
| 2008 (81st) | The Dark Knight | Nick Davis, Chris Corbould, Tim Webber, and Paul Franklin |
| 2008 (81st) | Iron Man | John Nelson, Ben Snow, Dan Sudick, and Shane Mahan |
| 2009 (82nd) | Avatar | Joe Letteri, Stephen Rosenbaum, Richard Baneham, and Andrew R. Jones |
| 2009 (82nd) | District 9 | Dan Kaufman, Peter Muyzers, Robert Habros, and Matt Aitken |
| 2009 (82nd) | Star Trek | Roger Guyett, Russell Earl, Paul Kavanagh, and Burt Dalton |

=== 2010s ===
| Year | Film | Nominees |
|---|---|---|
| 2010 (83rd) | Inception | Paul Franklin, Chris Corbould, Andrew Lockley, and Peter Bebb |
| 2010 (83rd) | Alice in Wonderland | Ken Ralston, David Schaub, Carey Villegas, and Sean Phillips |
| 2010 (83rd) | Harry Potter and the Deathly Hallows – Part 1 | Tim Burke, John Richardson, Christian Manz, and Nicolas Aithadi |
| 2010 (83rd) | Hereafter | Michael Owens, Bryan Grill, Stephan Trojansky, and Joe Farrell |
| 2010 (83rd) | Iron Man 2 | Janek Sirrs, Ben Snow, Ged Wright, and Dan Sudick |
| 2011 (84th) | Hugo | Robert Legato, Joss Williams, Ben Grossmann, and Alex Henning |
| 2011 (84th) | Harry Potter and the Deathly Hallows – Part 2 | Tim Burke, David Vickery, Greg Butler, and John Richardson |
| 2011 (84th) | Real Steel | Erik Nash, John Rosengrant, Dan Taylor, and Swen Gillberg |
| 2011 (84th) | Rise of the Planet of the Apes | Joe Letteri, Dan Lemmon, R. Christopher White, and Daniel Barrett |
| 2011 (84th) | Transformers: Dark of the Moon | Scott Farrar, Scott Benza, Matthew E. Butler, and John Frazier |
| 2012 (85th) | Life of Pi | Bill Westenhofer, Guillaume Rocheron, Erik-Jan de Boer, and Donald R. Elliott |
| 2012 (85th) | The Hobbit: An Unexpected Journey | Joe Letteri, Eric Saindon, David Clayton, and R. Christopher White |
| 2012 (85th) | The Avengers | Janek Sirrs, Jeff White, Guy Williams, and Dan Sudick |
| 2012 (85th) | Prometheus | Richard Stammers, Trevor Wood, Charley Henley, and Martin Hill |
| 2012 (85th) | Snow White and the Huntsman | Cedric Nicolas-Troyan, Philip Brennan, Neil Corbould, and Michael Dawson |
| 2013 (86th) | Gravity | Tim Webber, Chris Lawrence, Dave Shirk, and Neil Corbould |
| 2013 (86th) | The Hobbit: The Desolation of Smaug | Joe Letteri, Eric Saindon, David Clayton, and Eric Reynolds |
| 2013 (86th) | Iron Man 3 | Christopher Townsend, Guy Williams, Erik Nash, and Dan Sudick |
| 2013 (86th) | The Lone Ranger | Tim Alexander, Gary Brozenich, Edson Williams, and John Frazier |
| 2013 (86th) | Star Trek Into Darkness | Roger Guyett, Patrick Tubach, Ben Grossmann, and Burt Dalton |
| 2014 (87th) | Interstellar | Paul Franklin, Andrew Lockley, Ian Hunter, and Scott R. Fisher |
| 2014 (87th) | Captain America: The Winter Soldier | Dan DeLeeuw, Russell Earl, Bryan Grill, and Dan Sudick |
| 2014 (87th) | Dawn of the Planet of the Apes | Joe Letteri, Dan Lemmon, Daniel Barrett, and Erik Winquist |
| 2014 (87th) | Guardians of the Galaxy | Stéphane Ceretti, Nicolas Aithadi, Jonathan Fawkner, and Paul Corbould |
| 2014 (87th) | X-Men: Days of Future Past | Richard Stammers, Lou Pecora, Tim Crosbie, and Cameron Waldbauer |
| 2015 (88th) | Ex Machina | Mark Ardington, Sara Bennett, Paul Norris, and Andrew Whitehurst |
| 2015 (88th) | Mad Max: Fury Road | Andrew Jackson, Dan Oliver, Andy Williams, and Tom Wood |
| 2015 (88th) | The Martian | Anders Langlands, Chris Lawrence, Richard Stammers, and Steven Warner |
| 2015 (88th) | The Revenant | Richard McBride, Matt Shumway, Jason Smith, and Cameron Waldbauer |
| 2015 (88th) | Star Wars: The Force Awakens | Chris Corbould, Roger Guyett, Patrick Tubach, and Neal Scanlan |
| 2016 (89th) | The Jungle Book | Robert Legato, Adam Valdez, Andrew R. Jones, and Dan Lemmon |
| 2016 (89th) | Deepwater Horizon | Craig Hammack, Jason Snell, Jason Billington, and Burt Dalton |
| 2016 (89th) | Doctor Strange | Stéphane Ceretti, Richard Bluff, Vincent Cirelli, and Paul Corbould |
| 2016 (89th) | Kubo and the Two Strings | Steve Emerson, Oliver Jones, Brian McLean, and Brad Schiff |
| 2016 (89th) | Rogue One: A Star Wars Story | John Knoll, Mohen Leo, Hal Hickel, and Neil Corbould |
| 2017 (90th) | Blade Runner 2049 | John Nelson, Gerd Nefzer, Paul Lambert, and Richard R. Hoover |
| 2017 (90th) | Guardians of the Galaxy Vol. 2 | Christopher Townsend, Guy Williams, Jonathan Fawkner, and Dan Sudick |
| 2017 (90th) | Kong: Skull Island | Stephen Rosenbaum, Jeff White, Scott Benza, and Mike Meinardus |
| 2017 (90th) | Star Wars: The Last Jedi | Ben Morris, Mike Mulholland, Neal Scanlan, and Chris Corbould |
| 2017 (90th) | War for the Planet of the Apes | Joe Letteri, Daniel Barrett, Dan Lemmon, and Joel Whist |
| 2018 (91st) | First Man | Paul Lambert, Ian Hunter, Tristan Myles, and J. D. Schwalm |
| 2018 (91st) | Avengers: Infinity War | Dan DeLeeuw, Kelly Port, Russell Earl, and Dan Sudick |
| 2018 (91st) | Christopher Robin | Chris Lawrence, Mike Eames, Theo Jones, and Chris Corbould |
| 2018 (91st) | Ready Player One | Roger Guyett, Grady Cofer, Matthew E. Butler, and David Shirk |
| 2018 (91st) | Solo: A Star Wars Story | Rob Bredow, Patrick Tubach, Neal Scanlan, and Dominic Tuohy |
| 2019 (92nd) | 1917 | Guillaume Rocheron, Greg Butler, and Dominic Tuohy |
| 2019 (92nd) | Avengers: Endgame | Dan DeLeeuw, Russell Earl, Matt Aitken, and Dan Sudick |
| 2019 (92nd) | The Irishman | Pablo Helman, Leandro Estebecorena, Nelson Sepulveda-Fauser, and Stephane Grabli |
| 2019 (92nd) | The Lion King | Robert Legato, Adam Valdez, Andrew R. Jones, and Elliot Newman |
| 2019 (92nd) | Star Wars: The Rise of Skywalker | Roger Guyett, Neal Scanlan, Patrick Tubach, and Dominic Tuohy |

=== 2020s ===
| Year | Film | Nominees |
|---|---|---|
| 2020 (93rd) | Tenet | Andrew Jackson, David Lee, Andrew Lockley, and Scott Fisher |
| 2020 (93rd) | Love and Monsters | Matt Sloan, Genevieve Camilleri, Matt Everitt, and Brian Cox |
| 2020 (93rd) | The Midnight Sky | Matt Kasmir, Chris Lawrence, Max Solomon, and David Watkins |
| 2020 (93rd) | Mulan | Sean Andrew Faden, Anders Langlands, Seth Maury, and Steve Ingram |
| 2020 (93rd) | The One and Only Ivan | Nick Davis, Greg Fisher, Ben Jones, and Santiago Colomo Martínez |
| 2021 (94th) | Dune | Paul Lambert, Tristan Myles, Brian Connor, and Gerd Nefzer |
| 2021 (94th) | Free Guy | Swen Gillberg, Bryan Grill, Nikos Kalaitzidis, and Dan Sudick |
| 2021 (94th) | No Time to Die | Charlie Noble, Joel Green, Jonathan Fawkner, and Chris Corbould |
| 2021 (94th) | Shang-Chi and the Legend of the Ten Rings | Christopher Townsend, Joe Farrell, Sean Noel Walker, and Dan Oliver |
| 2021 (94th) | Spider-Man: No Way Home | Kelly Port, Chris Waegner, Scott Edelstein, and Dan Sudick |
| 2022 (95th) | Avatar: The Way of Water | Joe Letteri, Richard Baneham, Eric Saindon, and Daniel Barrett |
| 2022 (95th) | All Quiet on the Western Front | Frank Petzold, Viktor Müller, Markus Frank, and Kamil Jafar |
| 2022 (95th) | The Batman | Dan Lemmon, Russell Earl, Anders Langlands, and Dominic Tuohy |
| 2022 (95th) | Black Panther: Wakanda Forever | Geoffrey Baumann, Craig Hammack, R. Christopher White, and Dan Sudick |
| 2022 (95th) | Top Gun: Maverick | Ryan Tudhope, Seth Hill, Bryan Litson, and Scott R. Fisher |
| 2023 (96th) | Godzilla Minus One | Takashi Yamazaki, Kiyoko Shibuya, Masaki Takahashi, and Tatsuji Nojima |
| 2023 (96th) | The Creator | Jay Cooper, Ian Comley, Andrew Roberts and Neil Corbould |
| 2023 (96th) | Guardians of the Galaxy Vol. 3 | Stéphane Ceretti, Alexis Wajsbrot, Guy Williams and Theo Bialek |
| 2023 (96th) | Mission: Impossible – Dead Reckoning Part One | Alex Wuttke, Simone Coco, Jeff Sutherland and Neil Corbould |
| 2023 (96th) | Napoleon | Charley Henley, Luc-Ewen Martin-Fenouillet, Simone Coco and Neil Corbould |
| 2024 (97th) | Dune: Part Two | Paul Lambert, Stephen James, Rhys Salcombe and Gerd Nefzer |
| 2024 (97th) | Alien: Romulus | Eric Barba, Nelson Sepulveda-Fauser, Daniel Macarin and Shane Mahan |
| 2024 (97th) | Better Man | Luke Millar, David Clayton, Keith Herft and Peter Stubbs |
| 2024 (97th) | Kingdom of the Planet of the Apes | Erik Winquist, Stephen Unterfranz, Paul Story and Rodney Burke |
| 2024 (97th) | Wicked | Pablo Helman, Jonathan Fawkner, David Shirk and Paul Corbould |
| 2025 (98th) | Avatar: Fire and Ash | Joe Letteri, Richard Baneham, Eric Saindon and Daniel Barrett |
| 2025 (98th) | F1 | Ryan Tudhope, Nicolas Chevallier, Robert Harrington and Keith Dawson |
| 2025 (98th) | Jurassic World Rebirth | David Vickery, Stephen Aplin, Charmaine Chan and Neil Corbould |
| 2025 (98th) | The Lost Bus | Charlie Noble, David Zaretti, Russell Bowen and Brandon K. McLaughlin |
| 2025 (98th) | Sinners | Michael Ralla, Espen Nordahl, Guido Wolter and Donnie Dean |

== Shortlisted finalists ==
Finalists for Best Visual Effects are selected by the Visual Effects Branch Executive Committee. Beginning with a long list of up to 20 titles, the committee then advances ten films to the shortlist, where the full membership of the Visual Effects Branch is invited to view excerpts and is provided with supporting information at a "bake-off" where balloting determines the five nominees. Prior to the 80th Academy Awards, members of the Visual Effects Executive Committee would select an initial long list of anywhere between ten to twenty films, which would then be voted on to be narrowed down to a final list seven films, which would proceed to the bake off. For example, for the 77th Academy Awards, the long list had eighteen films. From 2007 - 2015, The Executive Committee settled on a long-list of fifteen semi-finalists each year. Starting in 2015, and continuing to today, the Academy expanded the long list to a set list of twenty films, although it is not always announced publicly.

| Year | Finalists | Ref |
|---|---|---|
| 1982 | The Dark Crystal, Das Boot, Star Trek II: The Wrath of Khan, Tron | |
| 1984 | Dune, Gremlins, The Last Starfighter, Star Trek III: The Search for Spock | |
| 1993 | Addams Family Values, Alive, Hocus Pocus, Super Mario Bros. | |
| 1994 | The Hudsucker Proxy, Interview with the Vampire, The Lion King, Speed | |
| 1995 | Batman Forever, Casper, Jumanji, The Indian in the Cupboard, Waterworld | |
| 1996 | Mars Attacks!, Mission: Impossible, The Nutty Professor, Star Trek: First Contact | |
| 1997 | Batman & Robin, Contact, The Fifth Element, Men in Black | |
| 1998 | Babe: Pig in the City, Godzilla, Small Soldiers, The Truman Show | |
| 1999 | The Mummy, Sleepy Hollow, Wild Wild West, The World Is Not Enough | |
| 2000 | Cast Away, Dinosaur, How the Grinch Stole Christmas, X-Men | |
| 2001 | Black Hawk Down, Cats & Dogs, The Fast and the Furious, Harry Potter and the Sorcerer's Stone, Jurassic Park III (Note: A tie resulted in eight finalists.) | |
| 2002 | Harry Potter and the Chamber of Secrets, Minority Report, Men in Black II, xXx | |
| 2003 | Hulk, Peter Pan, Terminator 3: Rise of the Machines, X2: X-Men United | |
| 2004 | First Round: The Incredibles, The Polar Express, Van Helsing; Second Round: The Aviator, The Day After Tomorrow, Lemony Snicket's A Series of Unfortunate Events, Sky Captain and the World of Tomorrow | |
| 2005 | First Round: Corpse Bride, Sin City, Stealth, Wallace & Gromit: The Curse of the Were-Rabbit; Second Round: Batman Begins, Charlie and the Chocolate Factory, Harry Potter and the Goblet of Fire, Star Wars: Episode III – Revenge of the Sith | |
| 2006 | Casino Royale, Eragon, Night at the Museum, X-Men: The Last Stand | |
| 2007 | First Round: Beowulf, Harry Potter and the Order of the Phoenix, Live Free or Die Hard, National Treasure: Book of Secrets, Ratatouille, Spider-Man 3, Sunshine, The Water Horse: Legend of the Deep; Second Round: The Bourne Ultimatum, Evan Almighty, I Am Legend, 300 | |
| 2008 | First Round: The Chronicles of Narnia: Prince Caspian, Cloverfield, The Day the Earth Stood Still, Hancock, The Incredible Hulk, Indiana Jones and the Kingdom of the Crystal Skull, Quantum of Solace, The Spiderwick Chronicles; Second Round: Australia, Hellboy II: The Golden Army, Journey to the Center of the Earth, The Mummy: Tomb of the Dragon Emperor | |
| 2009 | First Round: Angels & Demons, Coraline, Disney's A Christmas Carol, G-Force, GI Joe: The Rise of Cobra, Sherlock Holmes, Watchmen, Where the Wild Things Are; Second Round: Harry Potter and the Half-Blood Prince, Terminator Salvation, Transformers: Revenge of the Fallen, 2012 | |
| 2010 | First Round: The Chronicles of Narnia: The Voyage of the Dawn Treader, Clash of the Titans, The Last Airbender, Percy Jackson & the Olympians: The Lightning Thief, Prince of Persia: The Sands of Time, Shutter Island, The Sorcerer's Apprentice, Unstoppable; Second Round: Scott Pilgrim vs. the World, Tron: Legacy | |
| 2011 | First Round: Cowboys & Aliens, Sherlock Holmes: A Game of Shadows, Sucker Punch, Super 8, Thor; Second Round: Captain America: The First Avenger, Mission: Impossible – Ghost Protocol, Pirates of the Caribbean: On Stranger Tides, The Tree of Life, X-Men: First Class | |
| 2012 | The Amazing Spider-Man, Cloud Atlas, The Dark Knight Rises, John Carter, Skyfall | |
| 2013 | Elysium, Oblivion, Pacific Rim, Thor: The Dark World, World War Z | |
| 2014 | Godzilla, The Hobbit: The Battle of the Five Armies, Maleficent, Night at the Museum: Secret of the Tomb, Transformers: Age of Extinction | |
| 2015 | First Round: Bridge of Spies, Chappie, Everest, Furious 7, The Hunger Games: Mockingjay – Part 2, In the Heart of the Sea, Jupiter Ascending, Mission: Impossible – Rogue Nation, Spectre, Terminator Genisys; Second Round: Ant-Man, Avengers: Age of Ultron, Jurassic World, Tomorrowland, The Walk | |
| 2016 | First Round: Alice Through the Looking Glass, Batman v Superman: Dawn of Justice, Deadpool, Independence Day: Resurgence, Miss Peregrine's Home for Peculiar Children, Star Trek Beyond, Suicide Squad, Sully, Warcraft, X-Men: Apocalypse; Second Round: Arrival, The BFG, Captain America: Civil War, Fantastic Beasts and Where to Find Them, Passengers | |
| 2017 | First Round: Beauty and the Beast, Ghost in the Shell, Jumanji: Welcome to the Jungle, Justice League, Life, Logan, Pirates of the Caribbean: Dead Men Tell No Tales, Spider-Man: Homecoming, Thor: Ragnarok, Wonder Woman; Second Round: Alien: Covenant, Dunkirk, Okja, The Shape of Water, Valerian and the City of a Thousand Planets | |
| 2018 | First Round: Aquaman, Bumblebee, Fantastic Beasts: The Crimes of Grindelwald, Incredibles 2, Isle of Dogs, Mission: Impossible – Fallout, Mortal Engines, The Nutcracker and the Four Realms, Paddington 2, A Quiet Place; Second Round: Ant-Man and the Wasp, Black Panther, Jurassic World: Fallen Kingdom, Mary Poppins Returns, Welcome to Marwen | |
| 2019 | First Round: Ad Astra, The Aeronauts, Aladdin, Dumbo, Hobbs & Shaw, Ford v Ferrari, Jumanji: The Next Level, Men in Black: International, Midway, Spider-Man: Far From Home; Second Round: Alita: Battle Angel, Captain Marvel, Cats, Gemini Man, Terminator: Dark Fate | |
| 2020 | Birds of Prey, Bloodshot, Mank, Soul, Welcome to Chechnya | |
| 2021 | Black Widow, Eternals, Ghostbusters: Afterlife, Godzilla vs. Kong, The Matrix Resurrections | |
| 2022 | First Round: Bardo, False Chronicle of a Handful of Truths, Black Adam, Devotion, Elvis, Everything Everywhere All At Once, Good Night Oppy, The Gray Man, Gigi & Nate, RRR, Thor: Love and Thunder; Second Round: Doctor Strange in the Multiverse of Madness, Fantastic Beasts: The Secrets of Dumbledore, Jurassic World Dominion, Nope, Thirteen Lives | |
| 2023 | First Round: Ant-Man and the Wasp: Quantumania, Aquaman and the Lost Kingdom, Barbie, The Boys in the Boat, Dungeons & Dragons: Honor Among Thieves, Killers of the Flower Moon, The Marvels, Nyad, Transformers: Rise of the Beasts, Wonka; Second Round: Indiana Jones and the Dial of Destiny, Poor Things, Rebel Moon – Part One: A Child of Fire, Society of the Snow, Spider-Man: Across the Spider-Verse | |
| 2024 | First Round: Beetlejuice Beetlejuice, The Fall Guy, Furiosa: A Mad Max Saga, Godzilla x Kong: The New Empire, Ghostbusters: Frozen Empire, Here, A Quiet Place: Day One, Spaceman, The Substance; Second Round: Civil War, Deadpool & Wolverine, Gladiator II, Mufasa: The Lion King, Twisters | |
| 2025 | First Round: Captain America: Brave New World, The Fantastic Four: First Steps, How to Train Your Dragon, Lilo & Stitch, Mickey 17, A Minecraft Movie, Mission: Impossible – The Final Reckoning, Predator: Badlands, The Running Man, Thunderbolts*; Second Round: The Electric State, Frankenstein, Superman, Tron: Ares, Wicked: For Good | |

== Artists with multiple awards ==
8 awards

- Dennis Muren

6 awards

- Joe Letteri

5 awards

- Gordon Jennings
- Ken Ralston

4 awards

- L.B. Abbott
- Richard Edlund
- Paul Lambert
- Glen Robinson

3 awards

- Richard Baneham
- Randall William Cook
- Farciot Edouart
- John P. Fulton
- Alex Funke
- A. Arnold Gillespie
- Andrew Lockley
- Louis Mesenkop
- Gerd Nefzer
- Carlo Rambaldi
- Jim Rygiel
- Stan Winston
- Robert Legato

2 awards

- Daniel Barrett
- Neil Corbould
- John Dykstra
- Scott R. Fisher
- A.D. Flowers
- Paul Franklin
- Charles Gibson
- George Gibbs
- Allen Hall
- Thomas Howard
- Ian Hunter
- Brian Johnson
- Andrew R. Jones
- Eustace Lycett
- Robert MacDonald
- Tristan Myles
- John Nelson
- Warren Newcombe
- Bruce Nicholson
- Guillaume Rocheron
- Stephen Rosenbaum
- Loren L. Ryder
- Eric Saindon
- Fred Sersen
- Douglas Shearer
- Robert Skotak
- Kenneth F. Smith
- John Stears
- Richard Taylor
- Phil Tippett
- Bill Westenhofer
- Albert Whitlock

== Artists with multiple nominations ==
15 nominations

- Dennis Muren

13 nominations

- Dan Sudick

12 nominations

- A. Arnold Gillespie

11 nominations

- John Frazier
- Joe Letteri

10 nominations

- Richard Edlund
- Farciot Edouart
- Gordon Jennings

8 nominations

- Neil Corbould
- Ken Ralston
- Fred Sersen

7 nominations

- Nathan Levinson*

6 nominations

- John Bruno
- Chris Corbould
- Russell Earl
- Scott Farrar
- Roger Guyett
- John Knoll
- Douglas Shearer*
- John Richardson
- Phil Tippett
- Stan Winston

5 nominations

- L.B. Abbott
- Jack Cosgrove
- John Dykstra
- John P. Fulton
- Roger Heman
- Michael Lantieri
- Robert Legato
- Dan Lemmon
- Neal Scanlan

4 nominations

- Daniel Barrett
- Tim Burke
- Lawrence Butler
- Burt Dalton
- Jonathan Fawkner
- Charles Gibson
- Allen Hall
- Byron Haskin
- Pablo Helman
- Hal Hickel
- Arthur Johns*
- Paul Lambert
- Chris Lawrence
- Eustace Lycett
- Louis Mesenkop
- Thomas T. Moulton*
- John Nelson
- Glen Robinson
- Ben Snow
- James G. Stewart*
- Patrick Tubach
- Dominic Tuohy
- Vernon L. Walker
- Guy Williams

3 nominations

- Scott E. Anderson
- Scott Benza
- Ray Binger
- Eric Brevig
- Bernard B. Brown*
- Stéphane Ceretti
- Randall William Cook
- Paul Corbould
- Dan DeLeeuw
- George Dutton*
- Stefen Fangmeier
- Scott R. Fisher
- A. D. Flowers
- Paul Franklin
- Alex Funke
- George Gibbs
- Bryan Grill
- E.H. Hansen*
- Richard R. Hoover
- Donald Jahraus
- Joseph McMillan Johnson
- Andrew R. Jones
- Anders Langlands
- Andrew Lockley
- Robert MacDonald
- Erik Nash
- Gerd Nefzer
- Warren Newcombe
- Bruce Nicholson
- Carlo Rambaldi
- Stephen Rosenbaum
- Loren Ryder*
- Jim Rygiel
- Eric Saindon
- Roy Seawright
- Dave Shirk
- Janek Sirrs
- Scott Squires
- Richard Stammers
- Michael Steinore*
- Mark Stetson
- Scott Stokdyk
- Christopher Townsend
- Douglas Trumbull
- Bill Westenhofer
- Albert Whitlock
- Richard Yuricich

2 nominations

- Nicolas Aithadi
- Matt Aitken
- Richard Baneham
- Craig Barron
- Greg Butler
- Matthew E. Butler
- David Clayton
- Simone Coco
- Rob Coleman
- Art Cruickshank
- Jim Danforth
- Nick Davis
- Randal M. Dutra
- Paul Eagler
- Peter Ellenshaw
- Joe Farrell
- Michael L. Fink
- Thomas L. Fisher
- Bill George
- Swen Gillberg
- Alec Gillis
- Roy Granville*
- Ben Grossmann
- Craig Hammack
- Ralph Hammeras
- Charley Henley
- Thomas Howard
- Ian Hunter
- Joel Hynek
- Andrew Jackson
- Greg Jein
- Harley Jessup
- Brian Johnson
- Michael Kanfer
- Neil Krepela
- Anthony LaMolinara
- Danny Lee
- Milo B. Lory*
- Howard Lydecker
- Derek Meddings
- Michael J. McAlister
- Patrick McClung
- Grant McCune
- Ben Morris
- Tristan Myles
- Gerd Nefzer
- Dan Oliver
- Zoran Perisic
- Clay Pinney
- Kelly Port
- Elmer Raguse*
- Guillaume Rocheron
- Robert Skotak
- Robert Skotak
- Clarence Slifer
- Kenneth F. Smith
- John Stears
- Richard Taylor
- Jon Thum
- Adam Valdez
- Cameron Waldbauer
- Tim Webber
- Alex Weldon
- Kit West
- Jeff White
- R. Christopher White
- William H. Wilmarth*
- Erik Winquist
- Trevor Wood
- Tom Woodruff Jr.
- Hoyt Yeatman
- Matthew Yuricich
- Habib Zargarpour

== Franchises ==
=== Multiple awards ===
3 Wins

- Avatar
- Middle-earth
- Star Wars

2 Wins

- Alien
- Dune
- Indiana Jones
- King Kong

=== Multiple nominations ===
14 Nominations

- Marvel Cinematic Universe

10 Nominations

- Star Wars

5 Nominations

- Alien
- Middle-earth

4 Nominations

- Planet of the Apes

3 Nominations

- Avatar
- Avengers
- Batman
- Guardians of the Galaxy
- The Invisible Man
- Iron Man
- James Bond
- Jurassic Park
- King Kong
- Oz
- Pirates of the Caribbean
- Spider-Man
- Star Trek
- Wizarding World

2 Nominations

- Blade Runner
- Dune
- Indiana Jones
- The Jungle Book
- Mighty Joe Young
- Poltergeist
- The Poseidon Adventure
- Space Odyssey
- Superman
- Transformers
- War of the Worlds

== Superlatives ==
For this Academy Award category, the following superlatives emerge:

- Most awards: Dennis Muren – 8 awards (resulting from 15 nominations)
- Most nominations: Dennis Muren – 15 nominations (resulting in 8 awards)
- Most nominations without a win: Dan Sudick – 13 nominations

=== Age superlatives ===
| Record | Recipient | Film | Age | Note |
|---|---|---|---|---|
| Oldest winner | L. B. Abbott | Logan's Run | 68 years, 288 days | Special Achievement Award |
| Oldest nominee | John Frazier | The Lone Ranger | 69 years, 115 days | |
| Youngest winner | Tatsuji Nojima | Godzilla Minus One | 25 years, 149 days | |
| Youngest nominee | Tatsuji Nojima | Godzilla Minus One | 25 years, 102 days | |

== See also ==
- Saturn Award for Best Special Effects
- BAFTA Award for Best Special Visual Effects
- Critics' Choice Movie Award for Best Visual Effects
- List of Academy Award–nominated films
- Visual Effects Society Awards
