= Trevor Wood (special effects artist) =

English special effects artist

- Born: Trevor John Wood; July 31, 1953 (age 72); Eton, Berkshire, England
- Occupation: Special effects artist

Trevor John Wood (born July 31, 1953) is an English special effects artist. He won an Academy Award and was nominated for another one in the category Best Visual Effects for the films The Golden Compass and Prometheus.

== Selected filmography ==
- The Golden Compass (2007; co-won with Michael L. Fink, Bill Westenhofer and Ben Morris)
- Prometheus (2012; co-nominated with Richard Stammers, Charley Henley and Martin Hill)
