= Ray Binger =

American cinematographer (1888–1970)

- Born: November 16, 1888; Pickett, Wisconsin, United States
- Died: September 29, 1970 (aged 81); Orange County, California, United States
- Occupation: Cinematographer
- Years active: 1924-1948

Ray Binger (November 16, 1888 – September 29, 1970) was an American cinematographer. He started working in Hollywood in 1924, mastering the art of process photography. By 1934 he had gravitated towards special effects work. He was one of the many technicians involved in bringing authenticity to The Hurricane in 1937, and was instrumental in the plane crash sequence in Alfred Hitchcock’s Foreign Correspondent in 1940. Not all his assignments were quite that showy, however. He received an Oscar nomination in the category Best Special Effects for generating fake crowds to fill up the baseball stands in 1942's The Pride of the Yankees. He was nominated twice more in the same category for The Long Voyage Home (1940) and The North Star (1943).

== Career ==
Binger is credited variously as "R. O. Binger" and "Ray O. Binger". From the 1940s into the late 1950s he was active in process photography and special photographic effects, working mainly at Samuel Goldwyn's studio and on productions for United Artists and Walter Wanger,and later at Universal. His later credits include effects camera work with Clifford Stine on The Land Unknown (1957).

== Academy Award nominations ==
Binger was nominated three times for the Academy Award for Best Special Effects. In each case the nomination was shared with a sound-effects nominee, Thomas T. Moulton..

Ceremony	Film	Category	Nominee(s)	Result
13th	The Long Voyage Home	Best Special Effects	Ray Binger (photographic effects); Thomas T. Moulton (sound effects)	Nominated
15th	The Pride of the Yankees	Best Special Effects	Jack Cosgrove and Ray Binger (photographic effects); Thomas T. Moulton (sound effects)	Nominated
16th	The North Star	Best Special Effects	Clarence Slifer and Ray O. Binger (photographic effects); Thomas T. Moulton (sound effects)	Nominated
