= James B. Gordon (visual effects artist) =

American special and visual effects artist (1907–1972)

- Born: December 11, 1907; New York, U.S.
- Died: March 2, 1972 (aged 64); Los Angeles, California, U.S.
- Occupations: Special and visual effects artist

James B. Gordon (December 11, 1907 – March 2, 1972) was an American special and visual effects artist. He was nominated for an Academy Award in the category Best Special Effects for the film Journey to the Center of the Earth.

== Selected filmography ==
- Journey to the Center of the Earth (1959; co-nominated with L. B. Abbott and Carlton W. Faulkner)
