= Robert MacDonald (special effects artist) =

- Born: Robert Andrew MacDonald; July 16, 1912; California, USA
- Died: May 12, 1989 (aged 76); Ventura, California, USA
- Other names: Bob MacDonald; Bob MacDonald Sr. Robert MacDonald Sr. R. A. MacDonald
- Occupation: Special effects artist
- Years active: 1945-1986
- Spouse: Lucy Maude Rich 1914-1994
- Children: Robert MacDonald Jr., Deborah MacDonald, Lucy Romney MacDonald, Joan MacDonald

Robert Andrew MacDonald (July 16, 1912 – May 12, 1989) was an American special effects artist who won two Academy Awards.

== Oscar nominations ==
All three nominations were in the category of Best Special Effects.

- 32nd Academy Awards-Ben-Hur, shared with A. Arnold Gillespie and Milo B. Lory. Won.
- 35th Academy Awards-The Longest Day, shared with Jacques Maumont. Won.
- 18th Academy Awards-Nominated for They Were Expendable. Nomination shared with A. Arnold Gillespie, Donald Jahraus and Michael Steinore. Lost to Wonder Man

== Selected filmography ==
- Enemy Mine (1985)
- Gremlins (1984)
- Superman (1978)
- Ryan's Daughter (1970)
- The Charge of the Light Brigade (1968)
- Is Paris Burning? (1966)
- What's New Pussycat? (1965)
- The Longest Day (1962)
- Ben Hur (1959)
- Wizard of Oz (1939)
- They Were Expendable (1945)
- Topkapi (1964) (Also acted in small part)
