= Eustace Lycett =

British special effects artist (1914–2006)

- Born: Eustace Arden Lycett; 21 December 1914; Stoke-on-Trent, Staffordshire, England, UK
- Died: 16 November 2006 (aged 91); Fullerton, California, USA
- Occupation: Visual effects artist
- Years active: 1957-1980
- Spouse: Mary Ethel Lycett (1937-2004) (her death)
- Children: Kenneth, William, Roy and Victor

Eustace Lycett (21 December 1914 – 16 November 2006) was a British special effects artist who worked on attractions at Disneyland from the 1960s, such as Great Moments with Mr. Lincoln and Rocket to the Moon, as well as contributing to Disney animation.

== Oscars ==
All four of these films were in the category of Best Visual Effects

- 34th Academy Awards-Nominated for The Absent-Minded Professor. Nomination shared with Robert A. Mattey. Lost to The Guns of Navarone.
- 37th Academy Awards-Mary Poppins. Award shared with Peter Ellenshaw and Hamilton Luske. Won.
- 44th Academy Awards-Bedknobs and Broomsticks. Award shared with Danny Lee and Alan Maley. Won.
- 52nd Academy Awards-Nominated for The Black Hole. Nomination shared with Art Cruickshank, Harrison Ellenshaw, Peter Ellenshaw and Joe Hale. Lost to Alien.

== Selected filmography ==
- The Last Flight of Noah's Ark (1980)
- The Black Hole (1980)
- Shadow of Fear (1979)
- The Cat from Outer Space (1978)
- Return from Witch Mountain (1978)
- Herbie Goes to Monte Carlo (1977)
- Pete's Dragon (1977)
- Freaky Friday (1976)
- No Deposit, No Return (1976)
- The Shaggy D.A. (1976)
- Herbie Rides Again (1974)
- Snowball Express (1972)
- Bedknobs and Broomsticks (1971)
- The Boatniks (1970)
- My Dog, the Thief (1969)
- Blackbeard's Ghost (1968)
- The Gnome-Mobile (1967)
- The Happiest Millionaire (1967)
- Lt. Robin Crusoe, U.S.N. (1967)
- Mary Poppins (1964)
- Son of Flubber (1963)
- Summer Magic (1963)
- Bon Voyage! (1962)
- Moon Pilot (1962)
- The Absent-Minded Professor (1961)
- Babes in Toyland (1961)
