= Kit West =

British special effects artist (1936–2016)

- Born: 6 February 1936; London, England
- Died: 17 April 2016 (aged 80); England
- Occupation: Special effects artist
- Notable work: Raiders of the Lost Ark, Return of the Jedi

Kit West (6 February 1936 – 17 April 2016) was a British special effects artist who was most known for his work in Raiders of the Lost Ark, Return of the Jedi and Dune.

== Early life ==
Born in London, his early films were government and military training films produced by Realist Film Unit. He served two years in the British Army, where he gained experience in pyrotechnics.

== Oscar history ==
All these were for Best Visual Effects.

- 1981 Academy Awards-Raiders of the Lost Ark, award shared with Richard Edlund, Joe Johnston and Bruce Nicholson. Won the Oscar.
- 1985 Academy Awards-Young Sherlock Holmes, nomination shared with David W. Allen, John R. Ellis and Dennis Muren. Lost to Cocoon.
- 1996 Academy Awards-Dragonheart, nomination shared with Scott Squires, James Straus and Phil Tippett. Lost to Independence Day.

== BAFTA award ==
- 1983–Return of the Jedi-for Best Special Effects-Won, shared with Richard Edlund, Dennis Muren and Ken Ralston.

== Death ==
West died on 17 April 2016 and was cremated at Mortlake Crematorium.
