= Skotak =

Skotak is a surname. Notable people with the surname include:

- Dennis Skotak (born 1943), American visual effects artist
- Robert Skotak (born 1945), American filmmaker and visual effects artist
