= Kenneth F. Smith =

Special effects artist

- Occupation: Visual effects artist
- Years active: 1980-2003

Kenneth F. Smith is a special effects artist. He works at ILM as well. He also won 2 Academy awards.

== Oscars ==
Both films were in the category of Best Visual Effects

- 55th Academy Awards-E.T. the Extra-Terrestrial. Award shared with Carlo Rambaldi and Dennis Muren. Won.
- 60th Academy Awards-Innerspace. Award shared with Bill George, Dennis Muren and Harley Jessup. Won.

== Selected filmography ==
- Pirates of the Caribbean: The Curse of the Black Pearl (2003)
- Harry Potter and the Chamber of Secrets (2002)
- Minority Report (2002)
- Signs (2002)
- Harry Potter and the Sorcerer's Stone (2001)
- Planet of the Apes (2001)
- The Perfect Storm (2000)
- Galaxy Quest (1999)
- The Mummy (1999)
- Star Wars: Episode I – The Phantom Menace (1999)
- Deep Impact (1998)
- The Lost World: Jurassic Park (1997)
- Titanic (1997)
- Star Trek: First Contact (1996)
- Death Becomes Her (1992)
- Hook (1991)
- The Rocketeer (1991)
- Star Trek VI: The Undiscovered Country (1991)
- Back to the Future Part III (1990)
- The Hunt for Red October (1990)
- Back to the Future Part II (1989)
- Ghostbusters II (1989)
- Indiana Jones and the Last Crusade (1989)
- Who Framed Roger Rabbit (1988)
- Innerspace (1987)
- Back to the Future (1985)
- Cocoon (1985)
- The Goonies (1985)
- Young Sherlock Holmes (1985)
- Starman (1984)
- Star Trek III: The Search for Spock (1984)
- Return of the Jedi (1983)
- E.T. the Extra-Terrestrial (1982)
- Star Trek II: The Wrath of Khan (1982)
- Raiders of the Lost Ark (1981)
- Empire Strikes Back (1980)
