= Simone Coco =

Italian visual effects artist

- Occupation: Visual effects artist

Simone Coco is an Italian visual effects artist from Cagliari, Sardinia. He was nominated for two Academy Awards in the category Best Visual Effects for the films Mission: Impossible – Dead Reckoning Part One and Napoleon.

== Selected filmography ==
- Mission: Impossible – Dead Reckoning Part One (2023; co-nominated with Alex Wuttke, Jeff Sutherland and Neil Corbould)
- Napoleon (2023; co-nominated with Charley Henley, Luc-Ewen Martin-Fenouillet and Neil Corbould)
