= Harley Jessup =

American production designer and visual effects art director

- Born: Harley William Jessup; Corvallis, Oregon, U.S.
- Education: Oregon State University
- Occupation: Production designer
- Years active: 1980–2025
- Employers: Industrial Light & Magic (1987-1994); Pixar Animation Studios (1997–2025)
- Notable work: Innerspace (1987); Hook (1991); Monsters, Inc. (2001); Ratatouille (2007); Coco (2017)
- Spouse: Ann Jessup
- Children: 3

Harley William Jessup is an American production designer and visual effects artist who has been nominated for two visual effects Academy Awards, and won once. Best known for working at Pixar Animation Studios, Jessup has served as production designer for Monsters, Inc. (with Bob Pauley), Ratatouille, Cars 2, Presto, The Good Dinosaur, Coco, and Elio. Before coming to Pixar, Jessup was production designer on Walt Disney Pictures' James and the Giant Peach.

Jessup was a visual effects art director at Industrial Light & Magic from 1987 to 1994. From 1991 to 1994 he served as ILM art department creative director. Jessup's visual effects art direction credits include, Innerspace (for which he won an Academy Award for Best Visual Effects), Hook (nominated for an Academy Award), The Hunt for Red October (with Steve Beck), Ghostbusters II, Joe Versus the Volcano and Fire in the Sky.

In 1985, Jessup won an Emmy Award for best visual effects for The Ewok Adventure, produced by ILM's parent company Lucasfilm for ABC.

Jessup began his career at Korty Films designing animated short films for Sesame Street, including The Adventures of Thelma Thumb. He served as art director on John Korty's animated feature Twice Upon a Time.

Jessup has written and illustrated three children's books, What Alice Up to? and Grandma Summer for Viking Children's Books and Welcome to Monstropolis for Disney/Egmont. He studied graphic design at Oregon State University (BFA) and Stanford University (MFA).

In 2025, Jessup officially retired from Pixar following his work on Elio, marking the end of his 28-year tenure at the studio.

== Oscars ==
Both films were in the category of Best Visual Effects

- 60th Academy Awards: Innerspace. Award shared with Bill George, Dennis Muren and Kenneth F. Smith. Won.
- 64th Academy Awards: Nominated for Hook, nomination was shared with Eric Brevig, Michael Lantieri and Mark Sullivan. Lost to Terminator 2: Judgment Day.

== Selected filmography ==
- Twice Upon a Time (1983): art director
- Howard the Duck (1986): assistant production designer
- Innerspace (1987): visual effects art director
- Ghostbusters II (1989): visual effects art director
- The Hunt for Red October (1990): visual effects art director
- Hook (1991): visual effects art director
- James and the Giant Peach (1996): production designer
- A Bug's Life (1998): additional storyboard artist
- Monsters, Inc. (2001): production designer
- Ratatouille (2007): production designer
- Up (2009): lighting art director
- Cars 2 (2011): production designer
- The Good Dinosaur (2015): production designer
- Coco (2017): production designer
- Luca (2021): additional production design
- Elemental (2023): additional artist
- Inside Out 2 (2024): visual development artist (uncredited)
- Elio (2025): production designer
