= The Mystery in Dracula's Castle =

1973 Disney television film

- Genre: Mystery
- Directed by: Robert Totten
- Starring: Mariette Hartley; John Fiedler; Mills Watson
- Country of origin: United States
- Original language: English

Production
- Producer: Bill Anderson
- Cinematography: Charles F. Wheeler
- Production company: Walt Disney Productions

Original release
- Network: NBC
- Release: January 7 – January 14, 1973

The Mystery in Dracula's Castle is a 1973 American television film produced by Walt Disney Productions. Directed by Robert Totten, it originally aired in two parts on NBC's The Wonderful World of Disney on January 7 and January 14, 1973.

The screenplay was written by Sue Milburn, who won the Walt Disney Filmwriting Award while a junior at New York University. The award included $2,500 and ten weeks of employment at the Disney studio in Burbank, where she worked on the script with producer Bill Anderson.

The plot follows brothers Alfie and Leonard Booth, who are making a horror movie titled Dracula and the Sheriff’s Daughter while vacationing in a coastal community. They choose an abandoned lighthouse as a filming location, unaware that jewel thieves are using it as a hideout.

The premiere broadcast of Part 1 ranked fifth among U.S. television programs for the week of January 1–7, 1973, while Part 2 ranked fourth for the week of January 8–14 with a 28.4 Nielsen rating and 44 percent audience share. The second part aired immediately following Super Bowl VII on NBC. A 1973 novelization of the film, The Mystery in Dracula's Castle, written by Vic Crume, was published by Scholastic Book Services.

Film critic Kim Newman later reviewed the film on his website, discussing its children's adventure story, horror-film references and the boys' attempts to make their own monster movie. Retrospective reviews from Horror and Sons and MonsterHunter Movie Reviews also discussed the film's mixture of family adventure, mystery and horror-film imagery.

The production was Robert Totten's final project for Disney. His earlier work for the studio included Way Down Cellar, Ride a Northbound Horse, The Wild Country and Michael O'Hara the Fourth. The assistant director on the film was Robert D. Webb, the cinematographer was Charles F. Wheeler, art direction by John B. Mansbridge and Malcolm C. Bert, special effects by Alan Maley, Art Cruickshank, and Danny Lee, and set decoration by John A. Kuri.

The film also featured Higgins as Watson, the stray dog who joins the boys and later became best known for playing the title role in Benji.

== Cast ==
- Mariette Hartley as Marsha Booth
- John Fiedler as Bill Wasdahl
- Mills Watson as Noah Baxter
- Johnny Whitaker as Alfie Booth
- Clu Gulager as Keith Raynor
- James Callahan as Sheriff Wyndham
- Scott Kolden as Leonard Booth
- Peter Renaday as the Detective
- Higgins as Watson
- Maggie Wellman as Jean Wyndham
- Jean-Michel Michenaud as Morgan
- Link Wyler as the Patrolman
- Ben Wrigley as the Grave Robber in Curse of Count Dracula
