= Michael L. Fink =

American visual effects artist

- Occupation: Visual effects artist

Michael L. Fink is an American visual effects artist. He won an Academy Award for Best Visual Effects for the film The Golden Compass, and was nominated for another for Batman Returns.

== Selected filmography ==
- Batman Returns (1992; co-nominated with Craig Barron, John Bruno and Dennis Skotak)
- The Golden Compass (2007; co-won with Bill Westenhofer, Ben Morris and Trevor Wood)
