= Shadow of Fear (1979 film) =

1979 Disney television film

- Genre: Mystery
- Based on: The Healer by Daniel P. Mannix
- Written by: Gerry Day
- Directed by: Noel Nosseck
- Starring: Lisa Whelchel; Ike Eisenmann; John Anderson
- Composer: George Duning
- Country of origin: United States
- Original language: English

Production
- Executive producer: Ron W. Miller
- Producer: Jerome Courtland
- Cinematography: Tak Fujimoto
- Production company: Walt Disney Productions

Original release
- Network: NBC
- Release: January 28 – February 4, 1979

Shadow of Fear is a 1979 American television film produced by Walt Disney Productions for The Wonderful World of Disney. Directed by Noel Nosseck, it originally aired in two parts on NBC on January 28 and February 4, 1979.

The film was based on Daniel P. Mannix's 1971 novel The Healer, which was also the original title of the film.

The film was executive produced by Ron W. Miller, produced by Jerome Courtland, cinematographer was Tak Fujimoto, teleplay by Gerry Day, art direction by John B. Mansbridge and William J. Creber, music by George Duning, special effects by Eustace Lycett, Art Cruickshank, and Danny Lee, and the set decorator was Norman Rockett.

== Cast ==
- Lisa Whelchel as Robin Lapp
- Ike Eisenmann as Billy Stewart
- John Anderson as Abe Zook
- Joyce Van Patten as Laura Stewart
- Charles Tyner as Hans
- Peter Haskell as Dave Bryant
- Kip Niven as Jim
- John McLiam as Isaac
- Matt Clark as Ike
- Dermott Downs as Mark
- Pete Renaday as Jacob
- William H. Bassett as the Doctor
- Tom Scott as Paul
- Kurt Courtland as Amish Boy
- Tasha Lee Zemrus as Amish Girl
- Peg Stewart as Ruth
- Eddie Allen Bell as Lineman
- Regina Waldon as Woman
- Bill Murphy as Hunter

== Critical reception ==
According to The San Bernardino Sun, "the wolves used in the film were raised at George Toth’s Cougar Hill Ranch, which specializes in wild animals for movies, TV and commercials".

The Ukiah Daily Journal called it "a bizarre tale",, but the Kokomo Tribune felt it had "some good special effects".
