= Aloma of the South Seas (1941 film) =

1941 film by Alfred Santell

- Theatrical release poster
- Directed by: Alfred Santell
- Screenplay by: Frank Butler; Lillie Hayward; Seena Owen
- Story by: Seena Owen; Curt Siodmak
- Based on: Aloma of the South Seas by LeRoy Clemens and John B. Hymer
- Produced by: Monta Bell; Buddy DeSylva
- Starring: Dorothy Lamour; Jon Hall
- Cinematography: Wilfred M. Cline; William E. Snyder
- Edited by: Arthur P. Schmidt
- Production company: Paramount Pictures
- Distributed by: Paramount Pictures
- Release date: August 27, 1941
- Running time: 78 minutes
- Country: United States
- Language: English
- Box office: $2 million (U.S. and Canada rental)

Aloma of the South Seas is a 1941 American romantic adventure drama film directed by Alfred Santell and starring Dorothy Lamour and Jon Hall. The film was shot in Technicolor and distributed by Paramount Pictures.

Aloma of the South Seas is based on the 1925 Broadway play of the same name by LeRoy Clemens and John B. Hymer. It is a remake of the 1926 silent film of the same name. Lamour and Hall were the reigning darlings of south sea island adventures of this era having starred in John Ford's The Hurricane. Aloma of the South Seas fits into the romance adventure canon of which Lamour and Hall excelled at.

== Plot ==
Aloma and Prince Tanoa are promised by the islanders to wed from their childhood, though the two despise each other and fight. Tanoa is sent to the United States for his education and does not return for 15 years after the death of his father. Once crowned, Tanoa's treacherous cousin Revo who has plotted to rule in place of Tanoa since childhood, sees his chance by arming himself and his band with rifles and a light machine gun.

== Cast ==
- Dorothy Lamour as Aloma
- Jon Hall as Tanoa
- Lynne Overman as Corky
- Phillip Reed as Revo
- Katherine DeMille as Kari
- Fritz Leiber as High Priest
- Dona Drake as Nea
- Esther Dale as Tarusa
- Pedro de Cordoba as Raaiti
- John Barclay as Ikali
- Norma Gene Nelson as Aloma as a child
- Evelyn Del Rio as Nea, as a child
- Scotty Beckett as Tanoa as a child
- William Roy as Revo as a child
- Noble Johnson as Moukali

== Awards ==
The film was nominated for two Academy Awards:

- Best Cinematography
- Best Visual Effects (Farciot Edouart, Gordon Jennings, Louis Mesenkop)
