= Tom Howard (special effects) =

British special effects artist

- Born: Thomas William Howard; 27 March 1910; Northamptonshire, England, UK
- Died: 30 August 1985 (aged 75); Hertfordshire, England, UK
- Other names: Thomas Howard; Tommy Howard
- Occupation: Special effects artist
- Years active: 1940–1974

Tom Howard (27 March 1910 – 30 August 1985) was a British special effects artist who won two Academy Awards. He had 82 films from 1940 to 1974.

== Oscar History ==
Both of these were for Best Special Effects.

- 19th Academy Awards-Blithe Spirit. Won.
- 31st Academy Awards-tom thumb. Won.

== Biography ==
Tom Howard (born in Kent on 27 March 1910) was an esteemed British special effects artist who gained especial prestige for his work in the 1940s – 1960s, in what is considered the golden age of Hollywood filmmaking. Initially starting out as a theatre-projectionist – the cinema equivalent of a water boy – Howard would transition to Denham Studios, working under the tutelage of Alexandra Korda, a Hungarian film director who would have a profound impact on the evolution of Howard's career. Howard would become a key player in the production of many of Korda's films, including the perennial classic Lawrence of Arabia, dreaming up (alongside Lawrence Butler) the earliest innovations of impressive photographic effects that would eventually net him an Oscar for his work in David Lean's Blithe Spirit (1945). By 1945, his prestigious innovations would come to the attention of MGM, who would end up appointing him as Director of Visual Effects for their British Studios division, located in Borehamwood, a town in Southern Hertfordshire, UK. There, he would be responsible for many effects that are still celebrated as some of the most memorable work in the business today, demonstrating a pioneering eye for practical effects, use of space, and iconic visual imagery. His most notable works include the burning of Rome in Mervyn LeRoy's Quo Vadis and many of the effects shots that made Stanley Kubrick’s 2001: A Space Odyssey such a beloved film. His tenure at the British offices of MGM Entertainment would last 15 years. In 1958, Howard would win his sophomore Academy Award for his involvement with George Pal’s Tom Thumb at the 31st Academy Award ceremony, and continue to work on many films, including The Haunting, Where Eagles Dare, et al. A quiet, unassuming man, he made his home near the MGM studios in the village of Bushey where he and his wife, Dorothy, brought up their children, and the only sign of his illustrious film reputation were the doorstops to his study and the dining room which, on closer inspection, turned out to be his Oscars. By the time of his retirement, Howard would have touched as many as 150 motion pictures, and have accomplished work on 85 of them. Howard died in his home in Bushey, Hertfordshire, from a stroke on 30 August 1985, at the age of 75.

== On 2001: A Space Odyssey ==
Tom Howard was known to have a consistent working relationship with the legendary Stanley Kubrick, regarded by many as one of the greatest original filmmakers of all time. He would serve as special effects advisor on Kubrick’s "2001: A Space Odyssey". Combining optical and mechanical effects, the special effects that Howard, Kubrick, and other experts refined and collaborated on *"multiplied technical innovations: the intensive use of front projection for the landscapes in "The Dawn of Man" or the invention of stepping motors servo-controlled by computer for moving the spaceships."

== Appearances ==
As an individual who was always behind the camera, Howard rarely gave televised interviews. However, in the late 1970s, he was featured in an extended two-part interview on the program Clapperboard, hosted by Chris Kelly, where he discussed his experiences in Hollywood and the magic of visual effects. Otherwise, the only other times he could be persuaded to talk about his work were to cine film clubs or to local youth groups; when speaking to the latter he would usually begin by saying "I'm very old so you probably won't have heard of any of the people I've worked with" before going on to name people like Rex Harrison, Richard Burton, Stanley Kubrick, David Lean, etc. At the end of such talks he might show off one of his Oscars, usually transported in a teatowel.

== Other works ==
Tom Howard was also a "founding member of the British Society of Cinematographers and a fellow of the Royal Photographic Society and Britain’s Cinematograph, Sound and Television Society." In 1967, he would invent a variation on Front Projection Composite Cinematography. This patent would be widely influential on the process of filmmaking.

== Selected filmography ==
- The Little Prince (1974)
- Digby, the Biggest Dog in the World (1973)
- 2001: A Space Odyssey (1968)
- The Haunting (1963)
- Gorgo (1961)
- The Thief of Baghdad (1961)
- Tom Thumb (1958)
- Knights of the Round Table (1953)
- Blithe Spirit (1945)
- The Thief of Bagdad (1940)
