= Charley Henley =

Visual effects artist

- Occupation: Visual effects artist
- Years active: 1995–present
- Parents: Drewe Henley (father); Felicity Kendal (mother)

Charley Henley (born 1973) is a British visual effects supervisor. He was nominated at the 85th Academy Awards for his work on the film Prometheus, in the category of Best Visual Effects. He shared his nomination with Martin Hill, Richard Stammers and Trevor Wood. He was also nominated at the 96th Academy Awards for his work on the film Napoleon, in the category of Best Visual Effects. He shared his nomination with Luc-Ewen Martin-Fenouillet, Simone Coco, and Neil Corbould. He is the son of the actor Drewe Henley and actress Felicity Kendal.

== Selected filmography ==
- Gladiator (2000)
- Harry Potter and the Philosopher's Stone (2001)
- A Knights Tale (2001)
- Lara Croft: Tomb Raider (2001)
- Harry Potter and the Chamber of Secrets (2002)
- Alien vs. Predator (2004)
- Ella Enchanted (2004)
- Harry Potter and the Prisoner of Azkaban (2004)
- Harry Potter and the Goblet of Fire (2005)
- X-Men: The Last Stand (2006)
- Harry Potter and the Order of the Phoenix (2007)
- The Chronicles of Narnia: Prince Caspian (2008)
- The Chronicles of Narnia: The Voyage of the Dawn Treader (2010)
- Prometheus (2012)
- Total Recall (2012)
- 300: Rise of an Empire (2014)
- Cinderella (2015)
- Napoleon (2023)
