= Fred Sersen =

- Born: February 24, 1890; Veselí nad Moravou, Moravia, Austria-Hungary
- Died: December 11, 1962 (aged 72); Los Angeles, California, United States
- Occupation: special effects artist
- Years active: 1930–1956
- Awards: Best Visual Effects; 1939 The Rains Came; 1943 Crash Dive

Fred Sersen (February 24, 1890 – December 11, 1962) was an American painter and cinema special effects artist working mainly at 20th Century Fox Studios from the 1930s to the 1950s with credits in over 200 movies. He won two Academy Awards for Best Effects, Special Effects (photographic), in 1940 for The Rains Came, and in 1944 for Crash Dive. An artificial lake created for the former film was named in his honor.

== Biography ==
Fred Sersen was born Ferdinand Metoděj Sršeň, February 24, 1890, in Veselí nad Moravou, then a part of Austria-Hungary, At the age of 17 he moved to the United States. He studied art at the Los Angeles School of Art and Design, the Portland Art Academy, and the San Francisco Institute of Art. His first credited film was A Connecticut Yankee (1931). In 1937 he recreated the 1871 Great Chicago Fire on the screen for the film In Old Chicago. Other notable effects for which he is credited include the fire in Hangover Square, the flying saucer in The Day the Earth Stood Still, and the sinking of the ship in Titanic.

He died December 11, 1962, in Los Angeles, California.

== Academy Awards nominations and wins ==
Year	Title	Result	Ref
1939	The Rains Came	Won	
1940	The Blue Bird	Nominated	
1941	A Yank in the R.A.F.	Nominated	
1942	The Black Swan	Nominated	
1943	Crash Dive	Won	
1944	Wilson	Nominated	
1945	Captain Eddie	Nominated	
1948	Deep Waters	Nominated	
