= Arthur Johns (sound engineer) =

American sound engineer

- Born: October 30, 1889; Kansas, United States
- Died: September 4, 1947 (aged 57); Los Angeles, California, United States
- Occupation: Sound engineer
- Years active: 1925-1946

Arthur Johns (October 30, 1889 – September 4, 1947) was an American sound engineer. He won an Academy Award for Best Special Effects, and was nominated for three more in the same category.

== Selected filmography ==
Johns won an Academy Award for Best Special Effects and, was nominated for three more:

Won

- Wonder Man (1945)

Nominated

- Gone with the Wind (1939)
- Rebecca (1940)
- Since You Went Away (1944)
