= Days of Glory (1944 film) =

1944 American film directed by Jacques Tourneur

- Theatrical release poster
- Directed by: Jacques Tourneur
- Written by: Melchior Lengyel
- Screenplay by: Casey Robinson
- Produced by: Casey Robinson
- Starring: Tamara Toumanova; Gregory Peck
- Cinematography: Tony Gaudio
- Edited by: Joseph Noriega
- Music by: Daniele Amfitheatrof; Constantin Bakaleinikoff
- Production company: RKO Radio Pictures
- Distributed by: RKO Radio Pictures
- Release date: June 8, 1944
- Running time: 86 minutes
- Country: United States
- Languages: English; German
- Budget: $958,000

Days of Glory is a 1944 American film, directed by Jacques Tourneur, which tells the story of a group of Soviet guerrillas fighting back during the 1941 Nazi invasion of Russia. It marked the film debut of Tamara Toumanova and Gregory Peck, as well as most of the other principal actors. It was also the first film produced by screen writer Casey Robinson, who in early January 1943 had been contracted by RKO Radio Pictures to write and produce the film under the working title This Is Russia. Robinson and Toumanova married in 1944 and divorced in 1955. The film included the last screen appearance of actor Erford Gage, who subsequently entered the U.S. Army and was killed in action in 1945.

== Plot ==
In the wintry Russian countryside of the early 1940s, Vladimir leads a squad of partisans operating behind German lines. The group's routine is disrupted when Nina, a ballerina, is brought to their hideout after becoming separated from her troupe. She confesses she has neither handled a gun nor learned to fight, cook, mend, or clean. Vladimir doubts she will be of any use. Later, a German soldier stumbles upon the group's lair but is captured. That night, he attempts an escape, but, at gunpoint, Nina shoots him, winning the approval of her new comrades. The next night, when the guerrillas set out to sabotage a German munitions train, Vladimir takes Nina along to be initiated. The operation is a success. Yet although she and Vladimir are becoming close, Nina is put off by his ruthlessness. He explains that before the war he, as an engineer, had to destroy the very hydroelectric power plant he had helped build in order to keep the enemy from using it.

The couple's budding romance threatens the stability of the squad. At one point, when Vladimir must enlist someone to pass through Nazi lines to relay a coded message to his superior, he decides a woman would less likely be caught. He chooses the veteran Yelena, the only woman in the group besides Nina. When Yelena's horse returns to their hideout with blood on the saddle, Nina volunteers to take her place. Vladimir reluctantly accedes, sending the teen-aged boy Mitya along with her. Upon delivering the message, she is given a coded reply: "The snow will fall tomorrow." This indicates that an anticipated massive Russian counterattack will begin the next day. Vladimir's superiors put him in charge of a merged partisan operation.

Before the fighting begins, however, he orders Nina to take Mitya's younger sister Olga to safety.

Fighting bravely, the group's members are killed one by one, but Nina returns to Vladimir. As they fight on, he administers her the partisan oath of allegiance just before a German tank rolls atop their machine-gun nest and explodes.

== Cast ==
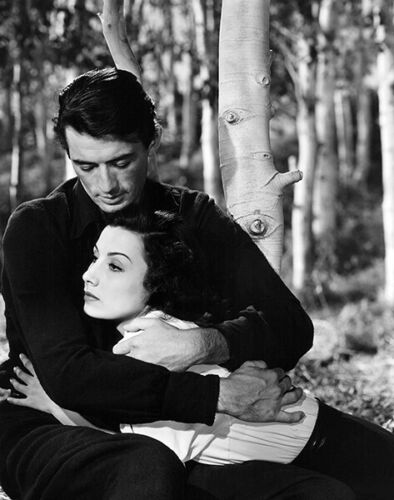
Peck and Toumanova

- Tamara Toumanova as Nina Ivanova
- Gregory Peck as Vladimir
- Alan Reed as Sasha
- Maria Palmer as Yelena
- Lowell Gilmore as Semyon
- Hugo Haas as Fedor
- Dena Penn as Olga, Mitya's Young Sister
- Glen Vernon as Mitya (credited as Glenn Vernon)
- Igor Dolgoruki as Dmitri
- Edward Durst as Petrov
- Lou Crosby as Johann Staub

== Production ==
Days of Glory is one of a handful of Hollywood films made during American participation in World War II to increase public support for the country's alliance with the Soviet Union against Nazi Germany. Such films, which would become the target of investigations during the Cold War by the House Committee on Un-American Activities, included Mission to Moscow, The North Star, Three Russian Girls, Counter-Attack, and Song of Russia.

Parts of the film were shot in Cedar City, Utah.

== Reception ==
Bosley Crowther faulted the screenwriter for "letting his story progress so fitfully and loading his characters with dialogue rather than stirring deeds." He said "the director failed to make the best of what he had," and "Gregory Peck comes recommended with a Gary Cooper angularity and a face somewhat like that modest gentleman's, but his acting is equally stiff." The film recorded a loss of $593,000.

On the review aggregator website Rotten Tomatoes, 53% of 15 critics' reviews are positive.

== Award nominations ==
Vernon L. Walker, James G. Stewart, and Roy Granville were nominated for the Oscar for Best Effects.

== See also ==
- List of American films of 1944
