= Jeff Sutherland (visual effects artist) =

English visual effects artist

- Occupation: Visual effects artist

Jeff Sutherland is an English visual effects artist. He was nominated for an Academy Award in the category Best Visual Effects for the film Mission: Impossible – Dead Reckoning Part One.

== Selected filmography ==
- The Siege (1998)
- The Perfect Storm (2000)
- Space Cowboys (2000)
- Pearl Harbor (2001)
- K-19: The Widowmaker (2002)
- Gangs of New York (2002)
- The Hunted (2003)
- Pirates of the Caribbean: The Curse of the Black Pearl (2003)
- Master and Commander: The Far Side of the World (2003)
- Star Wars: Episode III – Revenge of the Sith (2005)
- War of the Worlds (2005)
- Pirates of the Caribbean: Dead Man's Chest (2006)
- Transformers (2007)
- Iron Man (2008)
- Star Trek (2009)
- Terminator Salvation (2009)
- Battleship (2012)
- Transformers: Age of Extinction (2014)
- Jurassic World (2015)
- Rogue One (2016)
- Star Wars: The Last Jedi (2017)
- Bumblebee (2018)
- Star Wars: The Rise of Skywalker (2019)
- No Time to Die (2021)
- Mission: Impossible – Dead Reckoning Part One (2023; co-nominated with Alex Wuttke, Simone Coco and Neil Corbould)
