= Patrick McClung =

- Other name: Pat McClung
- Occupation: Visual effects artist
- Years active: 1979-2011

Patrick McClung is a two-time Oscar nominated visual effects artist.

== Oscar Nominations ==
Both are in the category of Best Visual Effects.

- 67th Academy Awards-Nominated for True Lies. Nomination shared with John Bruno, Thomas L. Fisher and Jacques Stroweis. Lost to Forrest Gump.
- 71st Academy Awards-Nominated for Armageddon. Nomination shared with John Frazier and Richard R. Hoover. Lost to What Dreams May Come.

== Selected filmography ==
- X-Men Origins: Wolverine (2009)
- Live Free or Die Hard (2007)
- X-Men: The Last Stand (2006)
- The Day After Tomorrow (2004)
- The Tuxedo (2002)
- Charlie's Angels (2000)
- Armageddon (1998)
- Dante's Peak (1997)
- Apollo 13 (1995)
- True Lies (1994)
- Cliffhanger (1993)
- The Abyss (1989)
- Die Hard (1988)
- Aliens (1986)
- Ghostbusters (1984)
- The Empire Strikes Back (1980)
- Star Trek: The Motion Picture (1979)
