= Richard R. Hoover =

Visual effects artist

- Other name: Richard Hoover
- Occupation: Visual effects artist
- Years active: 1992-present

Richard R. Hoover is a visual effects artist noted for his work on Armageddon, Superman Returns and Blade Runner 2049.

== Bio ==
Hoover earned a fine arts degree from the University of Oregon in 1980.

== Oscar Nominations ==
Both are in the category of Best Visual Effects.

- 71st Academy Awards - Nominated for Armageddon. Nomination shared with John Frazier and Patrick McClung. Lost to What Dreams May Come.
- 79th Academy Awards - Nominated for Superman Returns. Nomination shared with Mark Stetson, Neil Corbould and Jon Thum. Lost to Pirates of the Caribbean: Dead Man's Chest.
- 90th Academy Awards- Won for Blade Runner 2049. Nomination shared with John Nelson, Gerd Nefzer, and Paul Lambert.

== Selected filmography ==
- Jungle 2 Jungle (1997)
- Armageddon (1998)
- Inspector Gadget (1999)
- Unbreakable (2000)
- Seabiscuit (2003)
- Anchorman: The Legend of Ron Burgundy (2004)
- Superman Returns (2006)
- Valkyrie (2008)
- Cats & Dogs: The Revenge of Kitty Galore (2010)
- The Smurfs (2011)
- The Smurfs 2 (2013)
- Blade Runner 2049 (2017)
- Red Notice (2021)
