= William E. Snyder (cinematographer) =

American cinematographer

- Born: September 21, 1901; New York, U.S.
- Died: March 4, 1984 (aged 82); California, U.S.
- Occupation: Cinematographer

William E. Snyder (September 21, 1901 – March 4, 1984) was an American cinematographer. He was nominated for three Academy Awards in the category Best Cinematography for the films Aloma of the South Seas, The Loves of Carmen and Jolson Sings Again.

== Selected filmography ==
- Aloma of the South Seas (1941; co-nominated with Wilfred M. Cline and Karl Struss)
- The Loves of Carmen (1947)
- Jolson Sings Again (1948)
