= Mark Sullivan (visual effects artist) =

American visual effects artist

- Occupation: Special effects artist
- Years active: 1982-present

Mark Sullivan is a visual effects who was nominated at the 64th Academy Awards for the film Hook in the category of Best Visual effects. His nomination was shared with Eric Brevig, Harley Jessup and Michael Lantieri.

== Selected filmography ==
- Twilight Zone: The Movie (1983)
- Pee-wee's Big Adventure (1985)
- Killer Clowns from Outerspace (1988)
- The Abyss (1989)
- Ghostbusters II (1989)
- Indiana Jones and the Last Crusade (1989)
- RoboCop 2 (1990)
- Backdraft (1991)
- Hook (1991)
- The Rocketeer (1991)
- The Mummy (1999)
- Star Wars: Episode I – The Phantom Menace (1999)
- Star Wars: Episode II – Attack of the Clones (2002)
- The Passion of the Christ (2004)
- Apocalypto (2006)
- The Forbidden Kingdom (2008)
- The Tourist (2010)
