= Nathan Levinson =

American sound engineer

- Born: July 15, 1888; New York City, New York, United States
- Died: October 18, 1952 (aged 64); Toluca Lake, California, United States
- Occupation: Sound engineer
- Years active: 1927-1951

Nathan Levinson (July 15, 1888 – October 18, 1952) was an American sound engineer. He won an Oscar in the category Sound Recording for the film Yankee Doodle Dandy and was nominated for 16 more in the same category. He was also nominated seven times in the category Best Special Effects.

The Oscar statue that Levinson won for Yankee Doodle Dandy was sold for nearly $90,000 at an auction in Dallas in July 2011.

== Selected filmography ==
Levinson won a competitive Academy Award, an Academy Honorary Award, and was nominated for 16 more in the category Best Sound. He was also nominated seven times for Best Special Effects:

Won

- Yankee Doodle Dandy (1942)

Nominated (Best Sound)

- I Am a Fugitive from a Chain Gang (1932)
- 42nd Street (1933)
- Gold Diggers of 1933 (1933)
- Flirtation Walk (1934)
- Captain Blood (1935)
- The Charge of the Light Brigade (1936)
- The Life of Emile Zola (1937)
- Four Daughters (1938)
- The Private Lives of Elizabeth and Essex (1939)
- The Sea Hawk (1940)
- Sergeant York (1941)
- This Is the Army (1943)
- Hollywood Canteen (1944)
- Rhapsody in Blue (1945)
- Johnny Belinda (1948)
- A Streetcar Named Desire (1951)

Nominated (Best Special Effects)

- The Private Lives of Elizabeth and Essex (1939)
- The Sea Hawk (1940)
- The Sea Wolf (1941)
- Desperate Journey (1942)
- Air Force (1943)
- The Adventures of Mark Twain (1944)
- A Stolen Life (1946)
