= Roy Granville =

American sound engineer

- Born: August 12, 1910; Los Angeles, California, United States
- Died: September 1986; Mesa, Arizona, United States
- Occupation: Sound engineer
- Years active: 1935-1968

Roy Granville (August 12, 1910 – September 1986) was an American sound engineer. He was nominated for two Academy Awards for Best Special Effects.

== Selected filmography ==
Granville was nominated for two Academy Awards:

- Bombardier (1943)
- Days of Glory (1944)
