= Loren L. Ryder =

American sound engineer

- Born: March 9, 1900; California, United States
- Died: May 28, 1985 (aged 85); Monterey, California, United States
- Occupation: Sound engineer
- Years active: 1932–1968

Loren L. Ryder (March 9, 1900 – May 28, 1985) was an American sound engineer. He won five Academy Awards and was nominated for twelve more in the categories Best Sound Recording and Best Effects.

After serving in World War I, Ryder studied physics and mathematics at the University of California, Berkeley, graduating in 1924. He went to work at Pacific Telephone & Telegraph where he developed an improved technique for transmitting images over telephone lines, using light valves. In 1928, Ryder joined Paramount Pictures where he worked in the emerging field of talking pictures. From and 1936 until 1957 he served as the studio's chief engineer and sound director. Some of his achievements included the development of the VistaVision wide-screen format and the production of the first full-length film using magnetic audio recording. Ryder was part of the production team who received an Academy Honorary Award at the 11th Academy Awards for their efforts on the Paramount film Spawn of the North. During World War II, General George S. Patton called upon Ryder's audio expertise to help disguise the sounds of American tanks at the Battle of the Bulge.

== Selected filmography ==
Best Sound nominee

- Wells Fargo (1937)
- If I Were King (1938)
- The Great Victor Herbert (1939)
- North West Mounted Police (1940)
- Skylark (1941)
- Road to Morocco (1942)
- Melody Inn (1943)
- Double Indemnity (1944)
- The Unseen (1945)
- The War of the Worlds (1953)
- Rear Window (1954)
- The Ten Commandments (1956)

Best Effects

- Union Pacific (1939)
- Typhoon (1940)
