= A. D. Flowers =

American special effects artist

- Born: February 22, 1917; Hillsboro, Texas, U.S.
- Died: July 5, 2001 (aged 84); Fullerton, California, U.S.
- Occupation: Visual effects artist
- Years active: 1939–1979
- Spouse: Vivian Lois Shea (1938–2001) (his death)
- Children: 2
- Awards: Academy Award for Best Visual Effects (1970)

A. D. Flowers (February 22, 1917 – July 5, 2001) was an American special effects artist best known for his work on Tora! Tora! Tora!, which won him an Academy Award for Best Visual Effects at the 43rd Academy Awards. He was also a credited special effects artist for The Godfather and Apocalypse Now.

Flowers was born in Texas, and raised in Oklahoma. After graduating from high school, he relocated to California. There, he began an entry-level job at Metro-Goldwyn-Mayer. He served in the U.S. Navy during World War II on USS Saranac, a Type T2-SE-A1 Suamico-class fleet oiler. After being discharged from the service, he returned to California and continued to work in the film industry. He died at age 84 from complications of emphysema and pneumonia.

== Academy Awards ==
All three were in the category of Best Visual Effects, with one being a Special Achievement win.

- 43rd Academy Awards – Tora! Tora! Tora! (shared with L. B. Abbott).
- 45th Academy Awards – The Poseidon Adventure. Shared with L. B. Abbott. This was a Special Achievement Academy Award.
- 52nd Academy Awards – Nominated for 1941. Nomination shared with William A. Fraker and Gregory Jein. Lost to Alien.
