= George Dutton =

American sound engineer

- Born: December 19, 1899; Massachusetts, United States
- Died: May 13, 1977 (aged 77); San Marcos, California, United States
- Occupation: Sound engineer
- Years active: 1937-1958

George Dutton (December 19, 1899 – May 13, 1977) was an American sound engineer. He was nominated for five Academy Awards; three in the category Best Effects and two for Sound Recording.

== Selected filmography ==
Best Effects

- So Proudly We Hail! (1943)
- The Story of Dr. Wassell (1944)
- Unconquered (1947)

Best Sound

- Gunfight at the O.K. Corral (1957)
- Vertigo (1958)
