= Alex Weldon =

- Born: Alex C. Widlicska; 1914; Budapest, Hungary
- Died: 10 January 2004 (aged 88–89); Jamestown, New York, United States
- Occupation: Visual effects artist
- Years active: 1931–1980
- Spouse: Margaret Weldon (m. 1939)
- Children: 1

Alex Weldon (1914 – 10 January 2004) was an American visual effects artist. He was born in Budapest, graduated from Hollywood High School and attended UCLA.

He was nominated for two Academy Awards in the category of Best Visual Effects.

== Selected filmography ==
- Invasion of the Saucer Men (1957)
- King of Kings (1961)
- El Cid (1961)
- The Longest Day (1961)
- 55 Days at Peking (1962)
- The Fall of the Roman Empire (1964)
- Circus World (1964)
- Von Ryan's Express (1965)
- The Battle of the Bulge (1965)
- Krakatoa: East of Java (1968) *
- Patton (1970) *
- Papillon (1973)
- The Wind and the Lion (1975)
- Islands in the Stream (1977)
- Orca - The Killer Whale (1977)
- Star Trek: The Motion Picture (1980)

(*) Nominated for Oscar award
