= Warren Newcombe =

American special effects artist

- Born: April 28, 1894; Waltham, Massachusetts, United States
- Died: August 3, 1960 (aged 66); Coyoacan, Mexico
- Occupation: Special effects artist
- Years active: 1932–1957

Warren Newcombe (April 28, 1894 – August 3, 1960) was an American special effects artist. He won two Academy Awards for Best Special Effects and was nominated for another one in the same category. He worked on more than 200 films during his career.

== Selected filmography ==
The Enchanted City (1922), directed by Newcombe

Newcombe won two Academy Awards for Best Special Effects and was nominated for another one:

Won

- Thirty Seconds Over Tokyo (1944)
- Green Dolphin Street (1947)

Nominated

- Mrs. Miniver (1942)
