= Typhoon (1940 film) =

1940 film

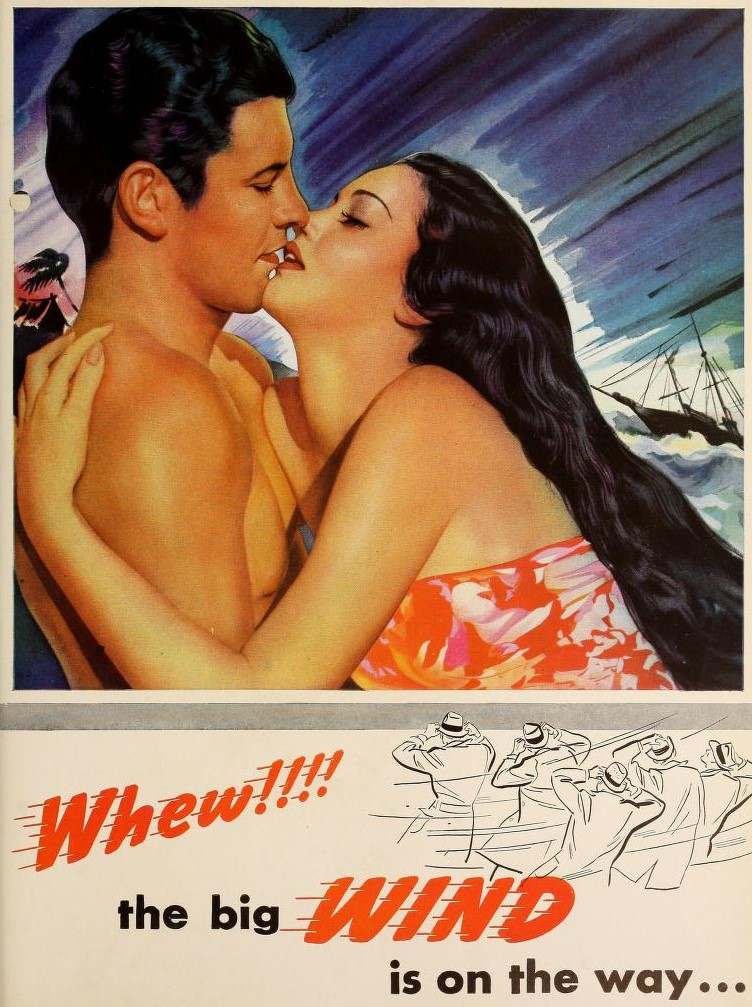
- Dorothy Lamour and Robert Preston in Typhoon
- Directed by: Louis King
- Screenplay by: Allen Rivkin
- Story by: Steve Fisher
- Produced by: Anthony Veiller
- Starring: Dorothy Lamour; Robert Preston
- Cinematography: Allen M. Davey; William C. Mellor
- Edited by: Alma Macrorie
- Music by: Friedrich Hollaender
- Color process: Technicolor
- Production company: Paramount Pictures
- Distributed by: Paramount Pictures
- Release dates: April 25, 1940 (Honolulu, Hawaii); May 17, 1940 (United States)
- Running time: 70 minutes
- Country: United States
- Language: English

Typhoon is a 1940 American south seas adventure film directed by Louis King and starring Dorothy Lamour and Robert Preston. It was nominated for an Oscar for Best Visual Effects (Farciot Edouart, Gordon Jennings, Loren L. Ryder).

== Plot ==
A young girl abandoned on a South Seas island falls in love with a worthless seafarer.

== Cast ==
- Dorothy Lamour as Dea
- Robert Preston as Johnny Potter
- Lynne Overman as Skipper Joe
- J. Carrol Naish as Mekaike
- Chief Thundercloud as Kehi
- Frank Reicher as Doctor
- John Rogers as Bar keep
- Paul Harvey as Dea's father
- Norma Gene Nelson as Dea, as a child
- Angelo Cruz as Kehi's bodyguard
- Jack Carson as Mate
- Al Kikume as Cook
