= Wilfrid M. Cline =

American cinematographer (1903–1976)

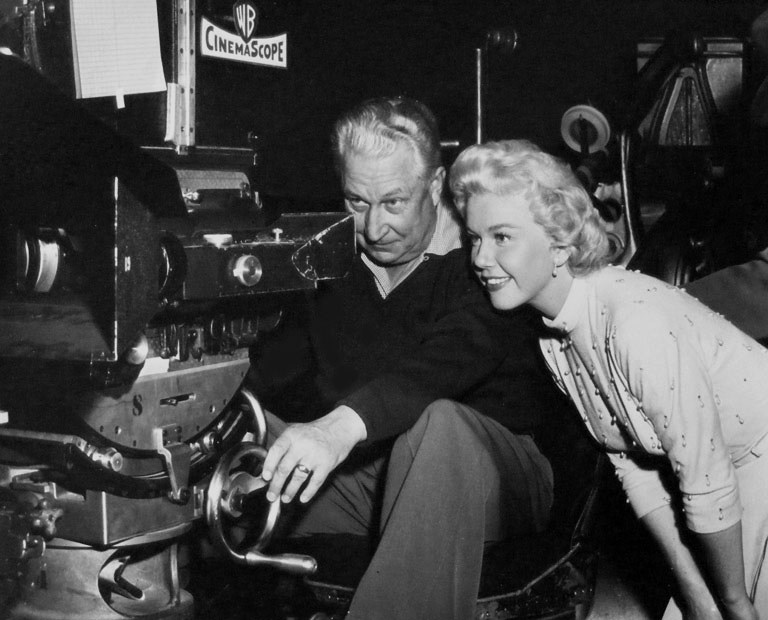
- Cline (left) on the set of Lucky Me with Doris Day, 1954
- Born: Wilfrid Mantin Cline; September 3, 1903; Los Angeles, California, U.S.
- Died: April 9, 1976 (aged 72); Balboa Island, California, U.S.
- Occupation: Cinematographer
- Spouse: Margaret Cline
- Children: 2

Wilfrid Mantin Cline (September 3, 1903 – April 9, 1976) was an American cinematographer. He was nominated for an Academy Award in the category Best Color Cinematography for the film Aloma of the South Seas. He was also nominated for a Primetime Emmy Award in the category Outstanding Achievement in Any Area of Creative Technical Crafts for his work on the television program My World and Welcome to It.

Cline died on April 9, 1976 in Balboa Island, California, at the age of 72. He was buried in Pacific View Memorial Park.

== Selected filmography ==
- Aloma of the South Seas (1941; co-nominated with Karl Struss and William E. Snyder)
- The Big Valley (1965-1969) cinematographer for 77 episodes
