= Alex Wuttke =

English visual effects artist

- Occupation: Visual effects artist

Alex Wuttke is an English visual effects artist. He was nominated for an Academy Award in the category Best Visual Effects for the film Mission: Impossible – Dead Reckoning Part One.

== Selected filmography ==
- The Flintstones in Viva Rock Vegas (2000)
- Brotherhood of the Wolf (2001)
- Die Another Day (2002)
- Lara Croft: Tomb Raider – The Cradle of Life (2003)
- The Chronicles of Riddick (2004)
- Alien vs. Predator (2004)
- Batman Begins (2005)
- The Magic Flute (2006)
- Flyboys (2006)
- 10, 000 BC (2008)
- Quantum of Solace (2008)
- 2012 (2009)
- Thor: The Dark World (2013)
- Ant-Man (2015)
- Spectre (2015)
- Wonder Woman (2017)
- Jurassic World: Fallen Kingdom (2018)
- Six Minutes to Midnight (2020)
- Mission: Impossible – Dead Reckoning Part One (2023; co-nominated with Simone Coco, Jeff Sutherland and Neil Corbould)
- Mission: Impossible – The Final Reckoning (2025)
