= Milo B. Lory =

American sound editor (1903–1974)

- Born: November 12, 1903; Indiana, U.S.
- Died: December 3, 1974 (aged 71); Hollywood, Los Angeles, California, U.S.
- Other name: Milo Lory
- Occupation: Sound editor

Milo B. Lory (November 12, 1903 – December 3, 1974) was an American sound editor. He was best known for his work on the film Ben-Hur (1959), which earned him an Academy Award. He was also nominated in the same category for his work on the film Mutiny on the Bounty (1962).

== Oscar nominations ==
Both nominations were in the category of Best Special Effects.

- 32nd Academy Awards-Ben-Hur, shared with A. Arnold Gillespie and Robert MacDonald. Won.
- 35th Academy Awards-Nominated for Mutiny on the Bounty. Nomination shared with A. Arnold Gillespie. Lost to The Longest Day.

== Filmography ==
- The Grissom Gang (1971)
- The Organization (1971)
- Too Late the Hero (1970)
- Mutiny on the Bounty (1962)
- Ben-Hur (1959)
- Saddle the Wind (1958)
- The Barretts of Wimpole Street (1957)
- The Teahouse of the August Moon (1957)
- Around the World in 80 Days (1956)
- Oklahoma! (1955)
- Athena (1954)
