= L. B. Abbott =

American cinematographer (1908–1985)

L. B. Abbott A.S.C.
- Born: Lenwood Ballard Abbott; June 13, 1908; Pasadena, California
- Died: September 28, 1985 (aged 77); Los Angeles, California
- Occupation: Cinematographer
- Awards: Best Special Visual Effect; 1967 Doctor Dolittle; 1970 Tora! Tora! Tora! Special Achievement Award; 1972 The Poseidon Adventure; 1976 Logan's Run

Lenwood Ballard "Bill" Abbott, A.S.C. (June 13, 1908 – September 28, 1985) was an American special effects expert, cinematographer and cameraman.

He became the head of the Special Effects Department at 20th Century Fox in 1957, a post he held until retirement in 1970. He was called out of retirement, however, to work on the TV series M*A*S*H in 1972 (Abbott had worked on the film on which the series was based). Abbott was a member of the American Society of Cinematographers.

== Awards and nominations ==
Academy Awards:

- Special Visual Effects for Doctor Dolittle (1967)
- Special Visual Effects for Tora! Tora! Tora! (1970)
- Special Achievement Award (Visual Effects) for The Poseidon Adventure (1972), with A. D. Flowers
- Special Visual Effects for Logan's Run (1976), with Glen Robinson and Matthew Yuricich

Academy Award nominations:

- Special Effects for Journey to the Center of the Earth (1959): Abbott (visual), James B. Gordon (visual) and Carlton W. Faulkner (audible)

== Selected filmography ==
- The Day the Earth Stood Still (1951)
- The Enemy Below (1957)
- Journey to the Center of the Earth (1959)
- Voyage to the Bottom of the Sea (1961)
- The Sound of Music (1965)
- Fantastic Voyage (1966)
- Doctor Dolittle (1967)
- Planet of the Apes (1968)
- Butch Cassidy and the Sundance Kid (1969)
- Patton (1970)
- The Poseidon Adventure (1972)
- The Towering Inferno (1974)
- Logan's Run (1976)
- The Swarm (1978)
- When Time Ran Out (1980)

== Television credits ==
- Voyage to the Bottom of the Sea (1964–1968)
- Lost in Space (1965–1968)
- The Time Tunnel (1966–1967)
- M*A*S*H (1972)

== See also ==
- Frank Van der Veer
