= Stand By for Action =

1942 American war film by Robert Z. Leonard

- Theatrical release poster
- Directed by: Robert Z. Leonard
- Screenplay by: George Bruce; John L. Balderston; Herman J. Mankiewicz
- Story by: Laurence Kirk; Harvey S. Haislip; R. C. Sherriff
- Produced by: Orville O. Dull; Robert Z. Leonard
- Starring: Robert Taylor; Brian Donlevy; Charles Laughton
- Cinematography: Charles Rosher
- Edited by: George Boemler
- Music by: Lennie Hayton
- Production company: Metro-Goldwyn-Mayer
- Distributed by: Loew's Inc.
- Release date: December 31, 1942
- Running time: 109 minutes
- Country: United States
- Language: English
- Budget: $1.4 million
- Box office: $3.2 million

Stand By for Action (British title: Cargo of Innocents) is a 1942 American black-and-white U.S. Navy war film from MGM, directed by Robert Z. Leonard, and starring Robert Taylor, Brian Donlevy, Charles Laughton, Walter Brennan. Marilyn Maxwell made her film debut in this feature. Suggested by a story by Laurence Kirk, and with an original story by Captain Harvey Haislip and R. C. Sherriff, the film's screenplay was written by George Bruce, John L. Balderston, and Herman J. Mankiewicz.

== Plot ==
During the early months of U.S. involvement in World War II, well-connected, Harvard-educated Lieutenant Gregg Masterman enjoys his cushy posting as the junior aide to Rear Admiral Stephen "Old Ironpants" Thomas, playing tennis and arranging various Navy social functions. During a chance encounter, he gives bad advice to up-from-the-ranks Lieutenant Commander Martin J. Roberts. As a result, Thomas gives Roberts command of a once obsolete but now reconditioned World War I-era destroyer, the USS Warren. To his dismay, however, Masterman finds himself reassigned by Admiral Thomas as Roberts' new executive officer. When Masterman learns that Henry Johnson, the ship's civilian caretaker, was a member of the Warren's original crew during the war and is familiar with the ship's quirks, he helps him to reenlist in the Navy with his old rating and once again serve aboard his beloved ship. Despite his awkward beginning, Masterman begins to turn into an effective sea officer under Roberts' tutelage, though Roberts has to constantly remind him that he cannot put the welfare of any person over that of their mission. The first time a Japanese plane attacks the Warren, though, it is Masterman's error that keeps them from shooting it down.

Admiral Thomas is put in charge of a convoy of ships from Honolulu to San Francisco, but one of the escort destroyers breaks down and USS Warren is assigned to replace it. While traveling at flank speed through a heavy Pacific squall to join the convoy, Johnson falls and suffers a concussion. Masterman violates orders and reduces speed to give Johnson a smoother ride for a while. Johnson improves but remains delirious, believing he is back aboard the destroyer during World War I. Before reaching the convoy, the Warren comes across a lifeboat from a ship that had to separate from it and was torpedoed. On it are two crewmen and a party being evacuated from a maternity hospital: two pregnant women and 20 babies. Masterman and the crew must deal with them, as well as two births.

Another Japanese plane attacks and cripples Admiral Thomas's flagship, damaging its steering mechanism. The Warren shoots the plane down, but its battleship emerges from a thick fog bank and opens fire on the flagship. It is up to the Warren's crew to take immediate battle action. Roberts informs Masterman of his attack plan: to set up a heavy smoke screen, double-back behind it, then charge through the smoke and launch a spread of torpedoes into the battleship at close range. When the captain is injured, Masterman must assume command. The injured Johnson is able to escape from sickbay and appears at the destroyer's helm shortly after the bridge crew are injured. He immediately takes charge under Masterman during the battle. The Warren successfully fires six torpedoes into the Japanese battleship, detonating its ammunition magazines and completely destroying the capital ship.

After their return to San Francisco, a formal ceremony is held aboard the now repaired USS Warren: a proud Admiral Thomas presents Roberts, Masterman, and a recovered Johnson with the Navy's highest honor, the Navy Cross, awarded by the president.

== Cast ==
- Robert Taylor as Lieutenant Gregg Masterman
- Charles Laughton as Rear Admiral Stephen Thomas
- Brian Donlevy as Lieutenant Commander Martin J. Roberts
- Walter Brennan as Chief Yeoman Henry Johnson
- Marilyn Maxwell as Audrey Carr (her screen debut)
- Henry O'Neill as Commander Stone M.C.
- Marta Linden as Mary Collins
- Chill Wills as Chief Boatswain's Mate Jenks
- Douglass Dumbrille as Captain Ludlow

== Production ==
A number of titles were considered, but ultimately the film became Stand By for Action. The other titles were: Cargo of Innocence (the title under which the film was released in Great Britain), A Cargo of Innocents, Men O'War, Clear for Action, Navy Convoy, This Man's Navy, and Pacific Task Force. Although the film was shot in Hollywood, it was originally scheduled to be filmed in late 1941 at MGM's studio in England, with Clarence Brown directing Robert Donat and Edmund Gwenn. Film production was shifted to California, however, because of the U.S. war situation following Pearl Harbor. The original intention was that the film would be set in the Atlantic Ocean and be about the Royal Navy. After the U.S. entered World War II, the story was shifted to focus on the U.S. Navy in the Pacific. This was the first naval war film made by MGM.

== Release ==
The film premiered on New Year's Eve, 1942, in a number of cities, including Boston, Providence, Rhode Island, Washington, D.C., Chicago, Norfolk, Virginia, San Diego, California, and San Francisco. MGM had previously screened the film for naval officers on bases in California.

== Response ==
=== Critical response ===
The critical response was not good, with the reviewer for Yank magazine saying that the film was "not about The War, but about Hollywood's War", and other reviewers comparing it to In Which We Serve, the 1942 British naval film written by and starring Noël Coward and directed by Coward and David Lean, with the earlier film being deemed superior. Bosley Crowther, the film critic for The New York Times, thought that Charles Laughton's performance was not his best, an opinion that Laughton himself agreed with, saying that it was like something out of H.M.S. Pinafore.

=== Box office ===
Despite the poor reviews, Stand By for Action was successful at the box office. It earned $2,013,000 in the US and Canada and $1,185,000 elsewhere making MGM a profit of $786,000.

== Awards and honors ==
The film was nominated for the Oscar for Best Special Effects (A. Arnold Gillespie, Donald Jahraus, Michael Steinore).
