= Ralph Hammeras =

American designer

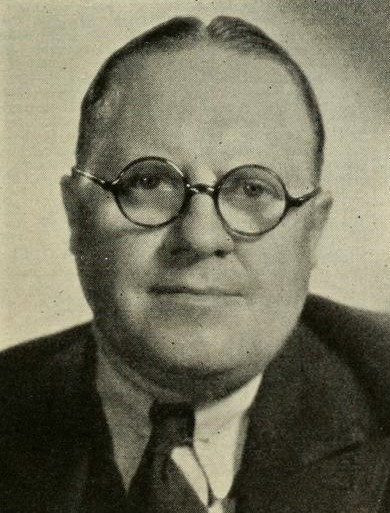
- Born: March 24, 1894; Minneapolis, Minnesota
- Died: February 3, 1970 (aged 75); Los Angeles, California
- Occupations: Special effects designer; Cinematographer; Art director
- Years active: 1925-1960

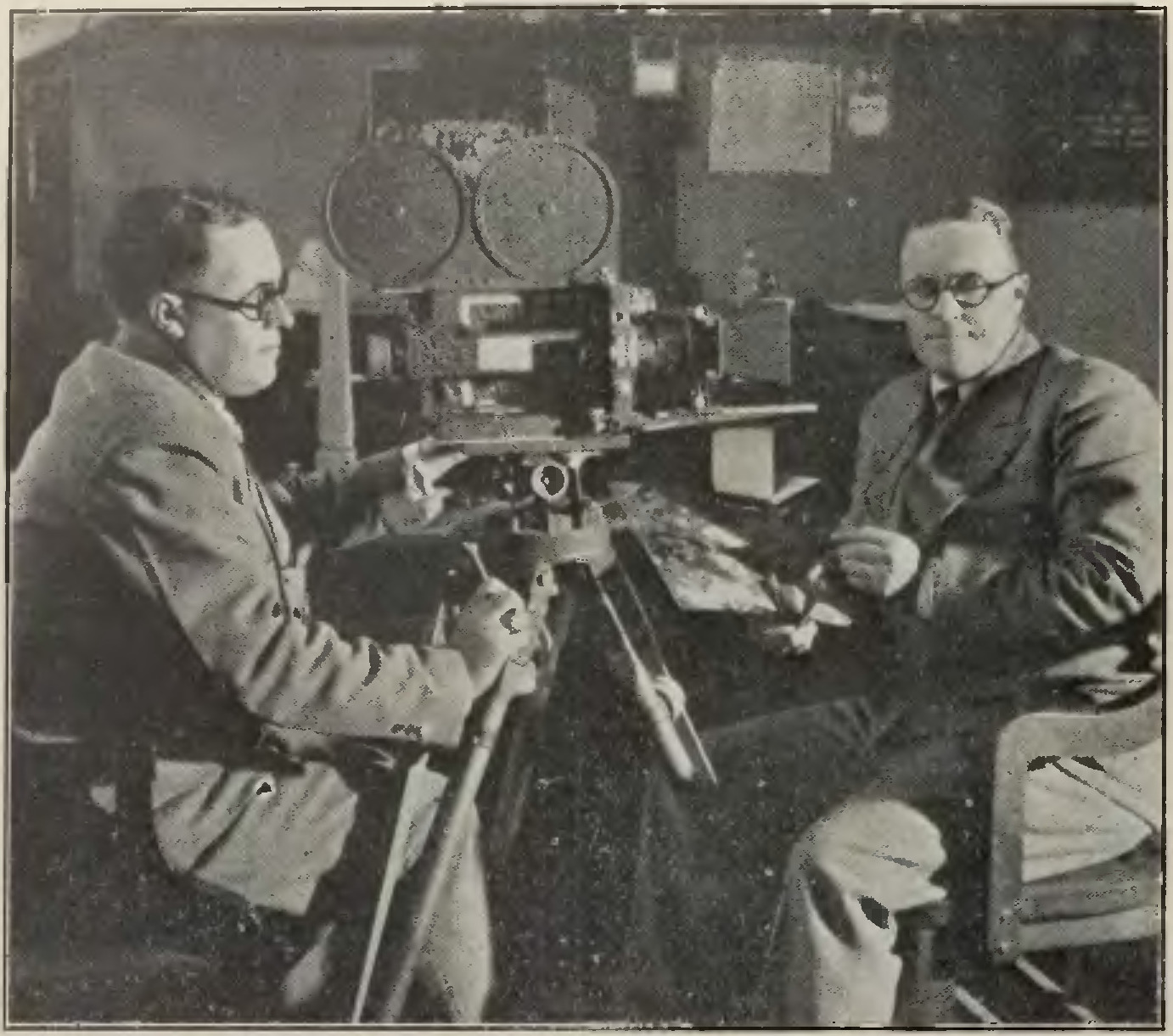
Ralph Hammeras trick photo in The Film Daily, 1929

Ralph Hammeras (March 24, 1894 – February 3, 1970) was an American special effects designer, cinematographer and art director. He was nominated for three Academy Awards. He created a large-scale miniature of the city of London for the film The Sky Hawk, he also created special mechanical effects for it. He was born in Minneapolis, Minnesota, and died in Los Angeles, California.

== Awards ==
- 1929: Nominated for an Academy Award for Best Engineering Effects.
- 1931: Just Imagine - Nominated for an Academy Award for Best Art Direction.
- 1949: Deep Waters - Nominated for an Academy Award for Best Special Effects.
