= Drewe Henley =

British actor (1940–2016)

- Born: 1940; Malvern, Worcestershire, England
- Died: 14 February 2016 (aged 75); Exeter, Devon, England
- Occupation: Actor
- Years active: 1963–1977
- Spouses: Jacqueline Pearce (m. 1963; div. 1967); Felicity Kendal (m. 1968; div. 1979); Lyn Henley (m. 1983; died 2015)
- Children: Charley Henley

Gordon Drewe Henley (1940 – 14 February 2016) was an English actor. He had a variety of roles in film, television and theatre including as Red X-Wing Squadron Leader Garven Dreis in Star Wars Episode IV: A New Hope. He retired from acting due to bipolar disorder. His second wife was actress Felicity Kendal, with whom he had a son, Charley Henley.

== Career ==
Henley appeared in film, television and theatre productions. These included episodes of Z-Cars, UFO, The Avengers and Randall and Hopkirk (Deceased) and a three-week run of Henry V in 1968 in which he played the lead role.

He is known for his role as X-Wing pilot Red Leader (Garven Dreis) in the film Star Wars Episode IV: A New Hope (1977), a role for which he was mistakenly credited as Drewe Hemley. Henley used an American accent for the part; the role had limited physical movement as Henley's character remained in the cockpit for much of the film which Henley found difficult. Unlike many of the actors in the first released film in the series, Henley's performance was not dubbed in post-production. Henley interpreted his character as an experienced battle veteran and so opted to play him without any excitement in his voice. Director George Lucas disagreed with this so they compromised so that Red Leader would at first be formal but as the battle progressed become more excited.

The performance was Henley's final one on film, as he was diagnosed with bipolar disorder, then known as manic depression, shortly after completing his part and retired from acting. When the Special Edition cut of Star Wars Episode IV: A New Hope was released in 1997 it featured an additional scene of Henley in which he talked with Luke Skywalker (Mark Hamill) and Biggs Darklighter (Garrick Hagon). Henley was pleased with the scene's addition, although his credit was not corrected.

== Personal life ==
He was married to actress Jacqueline Pearce for three and a half years from 1963 until they divorced. He married actress Felicity Kendal in 1968 and they had one son, Charley. They divorced in 1979 after he became manic depressive.

According to an interview with Kendal in 2000, Henley had become a "former" manic depressive. Henley and his illness were discussed in her autobiography White Cargo. He and his third wife, Lyn Henley, ran a bed and breakfast in Devon, and they were married until her death in 2015.

== Death ==
In 2013, Henley was diagnosed with vascular dementia and within the last 12 months of his life had become increasingly frail and his dementia was advancing. On Valentine's Day, 2016, he choked to death on a fish pie at the Royal Devon and Exeter Hospital. He was 75 years old.

Henley posthumously reprised his role as Garven Dreis from Star Wars Episode IV: A New Hope in the 2016 film Rogue One: A Star Wars Story via the use of archive footage. Previously unused audio was also used for some of his scenes.

== Filmography ==
=== Film ===
Year	Title	Role	Notes
1963	Heavens Above!	Doris' Boy Friend	Uncredited
1964	Nothing But the Best	Denis	
1964	633 Squadron	Thor	Uncredited
1965	Operation Crossbow		Uncredited
1965	The Alphabet Murders	Bowling Alley Attendant	Uncredited
1966	A Man for All Seasons		Uncredited
1967	The 25th Hour	Capt. Brunner	
1968	Mrs. Brown, You've Got a Lovely Daughter	Clive	
1970	Hell Boats	Sub. Lt. Johnson, R.N.	
1970	When Dinosaurs Ruled the Earth	Khaku	
1971	Puppet on a Chain	Jimmy Duclos	
1971	Quest for Love	Man	
1972	Frenzy	Forensics technician	Uncredited
1976	The Seven-Per-Cent Solution		Uncredited
1977	Star Wars	Garven Dreis (Red Leader)	Credited as Drewe Hemley
2016	Rogue One: A Star Wars Story	Garven Dreis (Red Leader)	Archival footage, posthumous appearance

=== Television ===
Year	Title	Role	Notes
1967	The Avengers	Murdering Groom (in "A Funny Thing Happened On The Way To The Station")	1 episode
1967	Wuthering Heights	Edgar Linton	3 episodes
1968-1969	Z-Cars	Steve Ritchie/Sgt. Walker	3 episodes
1969	UFO (Conflict)	Capt. Steve Maddox	1 episode
1970-71	The Doctors	Dr. David Owens	6 episodes
1974	The Protectors	Clarke	1 episode
1975	Hogg's Back	Weight-lifter	1 episode
1977	Space: 1999	Joe Ehrlich	2 episodes
