= Bill Anderson (producer) =

American film producer

- Born: William Hillyard Anderson; October 12, 1911; Smithfield, Utah, U.S.
- Died: December 28, 1997 (aged 86); San Francisco, California, U.S.
- Occupation: Producer
- Known for: Old Yeller, Zorro

William Hillyard Anderson (October 12, 1911 – December 28, 1997) was an American producer best known for his work with The Walt Disney Company. He also served on the company's Board of Directors from 1960 to 1984.

== Early life and career ==
Anderson was born in Smithfield, Utah. From a young age, he had the desire to be an actor. To pursue his dream, he moved to California, where he found himself playing small radio parts. He eventually abandoned acting in favor of the automobile industry. He studied pre-law at El Camino College Compton Center and the University of Southern California.

In 1943, the Walt Disney Company hired Anderson to work in their production control department. By 1951, Anderson had risen in the ranks to become production manager for Walt Disney. In 1956, he was named vice president in charge of studio operations. His first film as a producer was Old Yeller. He was given an associate producer credit. In 1959, Anderson's wife Virginia was instrumental in bringing Hayley Mills to his attention. He then suggested to Walt Disney that the English actress would be a good fit for the lead role in Pollyanna. He later produced Disney's 1960 adaptation of The Swiss Family Robinson. He worked extensively on the ABC television series Zorro, starring Guy Williams. He went on to produce many more successful Disney films like The Moon-Spinners, The Happiest Millionaire, The Mystery in Dracula's Castle, The Wacky Zoo of Morgan City, and The Apple Dumpling Gang. In 1960, he became a member of Disney's Board of Directors, a position he would hold until 1984. Anderson died from a cerebral hemorrhage in 1997 after suffering a fall. He was inducted as a Disney Legend in 2004.
