= Dennis Skotak =

American visual effects artist

- Born: Dennis John Skotak; 1943 (age 82–83); Detroit, Michigan, U.S.
- Occupation: Visual effects artist
- Spouse: D. C. Fontana (m. 1981; died 2019)
- Relatives: Robert Skotak (brother)

Dennis John Skotak (born 1943) is an American visual effects artist. He won an Academy Award and was nominated for another one in the category Best Visual Effects for the films The Abyss and Batman Returns.

== Selected filmography ==
- The Abyss (1989; co-won with John Bruno, Dennis Muren and Hoyt Yeatman)
- Batman Returns (1992; co-nominated with Michael L. Fink, Craig Barron and John Bruno)
