= Bruce Nicholson =

Special effects artist

- Occupation: Visual effects artist
- Years active: 1977–present

Bruce Nicholson is a special effects artist who received the Special Achievement Academy Award in 1980 for the visual effects of the film The Empire Strikes Back, which he shared with Brian Johnson, Richard Edlund and Dennis Muren. He won his first competitive Oscar for Raiders of the Lost Ark at the 1981 in the category of Best Visual Effects, where he shared his award with Richard Edlund, Kit West and Joe Johnston. He got one more Oscar nomination, for the 1982 for the film Poltergeist, which lost to E.T. the Extra-Terrestrial.

He has worked on nearly 50 films since 1977.
