= Louis Mesenkop =

American sound engineer

- Born: Louis Henry Mesenkop; February 6, 1903; Illinois, United States
- Died: February 19, 1974 (aged 71); Los Angeles, California, United States
- Occupation: Sound engineer
- Years active: 1935-1956

Louis Mesenkop (February 6, 1903 – February 19, 1974) was an American sound engineer. He won two Academy Awards for Best Special Effects and was nominated for another in the same category. Mesenkop was part of the production team who received an Academy Honorary Award at the 11th Academy Awards for their efforts on the Paramount film Spawn of the North.

== Selected filmography ==
Mesenkop won two Academy Awards for Best Special Effects and was nominated for another:

Won

- I Wanted Wings (1941)
- Reap the Wild Wind (1942)

Nominated

- Aloma of the South Seas (1941)
