= Jack Cosgrove (special effects artist) =

American special effects artist

- Born: June 9, 1902; Catalina Island, California, United States
- Died: March 10, 1965 (aged 62); Hermosa Beach, California, United States
- Occupation: Special effects artist
- Years active: 1934-1960

Jack Cosgrove (June 9, 1902 – March 10, 1965) was an American special effects artist. He was nominated for five Academy Awards for Best Special Effects.

== Selected filmography ==
Cosgrove was nominated for five Academy Awards for his contribution to the following films:

- Gone with the Wind (1939)
- Rebecca (1940)
- The Pride of the Yankees (1942)
- Since You Went Away (1944)
- Spellbound (1945)

He also was in charge of special effects in other films such as Duel in the Sun (1946), Joan of Arc (1948), She Wore a Yellow Ribbon (1949), Flight to Mars (1951) and Invaders from Mars (1953), among others.
