= Thomas T. Moulton =

American sound engineer

- Born: January 1, 1896; Wausau, Wisconsin, United States
- Died: March 29, 1967 (aged 71); Fresno, California, United States
- Occupation: Sound engineer
- Years active: 1934-1952

Thomas T. Moulton (January 1, 1896 – March 29, 1967) was an American sound engineer. He won five Academy Awards in the category Sound Recording and was nominated for eleven more in the same category. He was also nominated four times in the category Best Visual Effects.

== Selected filmography ==
Moulton won five Academy Awards for Best Sound, was nominated for eleven more in the same category and four more for Best Visual Effects:

Won

- The Hurricane (1937)
- The Cowboy and the Lady (1938)
- The Snake Pit (1948)
- Twelve O'Clock High (1949)
- All About Eve (1950)

Nominated (Best Sound)

- The Affairs of Cellini (1934)
- The Dark Angel (1935)
- Dodsworth (1936)
- Gone with the Wind (1939)
- Our Town (1940)
- Ball of Fire (1941)
- The Pride of the Yankees (1942)
- The North Star (1943)
- Casanova Brown (1944)
- Leave Her to Heaven (1945)
- With a Song in My Heart (1952)

Nominated (Best Visual Effects)

- Foreign Correspondent (1940)
- The Long Voyage Home (1940)
- The Pride of the Yankees (1942)
- The North Star (1943)
