= Donald Jahraus =

American special effects artist

- Born: July 13, 1892; Salt Lake City, Utah
- Died: April 3, 1963 (aged 70); Los Angeles, California, U.S.
- Occupation: Special effects artist
- Years active: 1930–1956

Donald Jahraus (July 13, 1892 – April 3, 1963) was an American special effects artist. He won an Academy Award for Best Special Effects and was nominated for two more in the same category.

== Selected filmography ==
Jahraus won an Academy Award for Best Special Effects and was nominated for two more:

Won

- Thirty Seconds Over Tokyo (1944)

Nominated

- Stand By for Action (1942)
- They Were Expendable (1945)
