= Art Cruickshank =

American special effects artist

- Born: December 17, 1918; Massachusetts
- Died: May 22, 1983 (aged 64); Los Angeles, California
- Occupation: Special Effects artist
- Years active: 1964-1983

Art Cruickshank (December 17, 1918 – May 22, 1983) was an American special effects artist who worked at both Disney and 20th Century Fox. Before he was in special effects, Cruickshank was a cameraman at Disney.

== Oscars ==
Both of these were in the category of Best Visual Effects

- 39th Academy Awards-Fantastic Voyage. Won.
- 52nd Academy Awards-Nominated for The Black Hole. Nomination shared with Harrison Ellenshaw, Peter Ellenshaw, Joe Hale, Danny Lee and Eustace Lycett. Lost to Alien.
