= Spawn of the North =

1938 film by Henry Hathaway

- Directed by: Henry Hathaway
- Written by: Jules Furthman; Talbot Jennings
- Produced by: Albert Lewin
- Starring: George Raft; Henry Fonda; Dorothy Lamour; John Barrymore
- Cinematography: Charles Lang
- Edited by: Ellsworth Hoagland
- Music by: Score: Dimitri Tiomkin; Songs: Burton Lane (music); Frank Loesser (lyrics); Sam Coslow (music & lyrics)
- Production company: Paramount Pictures
- Distributed by: Paramount Pictures
- Release date: August 26, 1938 (United States)
- Running time: 110 minutes
- Country: United States
- Language: English
- Budget: over $1 million

Spawn of the North is a 1938 American adventure film directed by Henry Hathaway about rival fishermen in Alaska starring George Raft, Henry Fonda and Dorothy Lamour and featuring Akim Tamiroff and John Barrymore. Spawn of the North is based on the novel of the same name by Barrett Willoughby and shares plot similarities with The Virginian, transferred to Alaska.

== Plot ==
Jim Kimmerlee owns a salmon cannery. He is pleased to see old friend Tyler Dawson, who has been away hunting seal. Tyler's sweetheart, hotel owner Nicky Duval, is also happy to see him.

Thieves have been stealing from fishing traps. Jim is determined to put a stop to it, engaging in a feud with Red Skain, a Russian fisherman who is suspected in the thefts.

Di Turlon comes back to town after several years of big-city life. The adjustment to the fishing community is awkward at first, but Di comes around and becomes interested romantically in Jim.

As he and others go after Red and the thieves, Jim is dismayed to learn that Tyler has become one of Red's accomplices. Planning to catch the fish poachers in the act, Jim tries to spare Tyler by having Nicky sabotage his boat, but Tyler finds another vessel and joins Red at sea. Jim exchanges gunfire with the thieves, killing two and wounding Tyler.

After being found and helped by his friend after Red has abandoned him, Tyler decides there is one more thing he must do. Close to death, he takes a boat back out, confronts Red, then blows a loud boat whistle that causes an avalanche, resulting in both men's death. Jim speaks admiringly of his friend's sacrificial act.

== Cast ==
- George Raft as Tyler Dawson
- Henry Fonda as Jim Kimmerlee
- Dorothy Lamour as Nicky Duval
- Akim Tamiroff as Red Skain
- John Barrymore as Windy Turlon
- Louise Platt as "Di" Turlon
- Lynne Overman as "Jack" Jackson
- Fuzzy Knight as Lefty Jones
- Vladimir Sokoloff as Dimitri
- Duncan Renaldo as Ivan
- John Wray as Dr. Sparks
- Michio Ito as Indian Dancer
- Stanley Andrews as Partridge
- Richard Ung as Tom
- Slicker, the Seal

== Reception ==
=== Critical ===
Picturegoer’s Lionel Collier wrote, "It is a very fine piece of spectacular workmanship with plenty of comedy, a strong sense of drama and brilliant scenic qualities." He added that "the story is on the hackneyed side" and "Development, too, is inclined to be a little slow, and a further editing out of some of the padding would help considerably." He offered a positive assessment of the cast members and wrote that George Raft gave a “"nicely balanced characterization with no forcing either of comedy or dramatic moments … Henry Fonda - who always is inclined to look rather pained in expression - is sound as his greatest friend … Dorothy Lamour acquits herself well as Tyler's tempestuous but devoted sweetheart, and Louise Platt scores as a young girl who falls in love with Henry Fonda. Three excellent character studies are given by Akim Tamiroff as the villain of the piece, John Barrymore as the editor of the local paper … and Lynne Overman as his assistant."

=== Box office and accolades ===
The film was a big box office success and was later remade as Alaska Seas (1954).

The special effects and production team who worked on Spawn of the North received an Academy Honorary Award at the 11th Academy Awards for their efforts. The award was given to the special effects artist Gordon Jennings, with assistance from Jan Domela, Dev Jennings, Irmin Roberts and Art Smith; the transparencies artist Farciot Edouart, with assistance from Loyal Griggs and the sound effects artist Loren L. Ryder, with assistance from Harry D. Mills, Louis Mesenkop and Walter Oberst.
