= Michael Steinore =

American sound engineer

- Born: 1901; New York City, United States
- Died: February 19 1961 (aged 59–60)
- Occupation: Sound engineer
- Years active: 1934-1953

Michael Steinore (1901 – February 19, 1961) was an American sound engineer. He won an Academy Award for Best Special Effects and was nominated for two more in the same category. He worked on more than 60 films during his career.

== Selected filmography ==
Steinore won an Academy Award for Best Special Effects and was nominated for two more:

Won

- Green Dolphin Street (1947)

Nominated

- Stand By for Action (1942)
- They Were Expendable (1945)
