= Martin Hill (visual effects artist) =

Special effects artist

- Occupation: Visual effects artist
- Years active: 2000-present

Martin Hill is a special effects artist. He was nominated at the 85th Academy Awards for his work on the film Prometheus, in the category of Best Visual Effects. He shared his nomination with Charley Henley, Richard Stammers and Trevor Wood.

In 2014, Hill was awarded at the 86th Academy Scientific and Technical Awards, an Academy Scientific and Technical Award, for the Spherical Harmonics-based Efficient Lighting System at Weta Digital. He shares this award with Nick McKenzie and Jon Allitt. Hill also won an Primetime Emmy Award.

== Selected filmography ==
- Enemy at the Gates (2001)
- Batman Begins (2005)
- King Kong (2005)
- X-Men: The Last Stand (2006)
- Avatar (2009)
- The Adventures of Tintin: The Secret of the Unicorn (2011)
- Rise of the Planet of the Apes (2011)
- The Hobbit: An Unexpected Journey (2012)
- Prometheus (2012)
- The Wolverine (2013)
- Furious 7 (2015)
- Valerian and the City of a Thousand Planets (2017)
