= Ben Morris (special effects artist) =

British visual effects supervisor

Ben Morris is a special effects artist. He was co-nominated for Academy Award for Best Visual Effects for Star Wars: The Last Jedi, and won the award for The Golden Compass.
