= Luc-Ewen Martin-Fenouillet =

French visual effects artist

- Occupation: Visual effects artist

Luc-Ewen Martin-Fenouillet is a French visual effects artist. He was nominated for an Academy Award in the category Best Visual Effects for the film Napoleon.

== Selected filmography ==
- John Carter (2012)
- World War Z (2013)
- The Hunger Games: Catching Fire (2013)
- X-Men: Days of Future Past (2014)
- Hercules (2014)
- Jupiter Ascending (2015)
- San Andreas (2015)
- The Man from U.N.C.L.E. (2015)
- The Last Witch Hunter (2015)
- Alien: Covenant (2017)
- Pirates of the Caribbean: Dead Men Tell No Tales (2017)
- The Mummy (2017)
- The Greatest Showman (2017)
- The Predator (2018)
- Dumbo (2019)
- Maleficent: Mistress of Evil (2019)
- Artemis Fowl (2020)
- Cruella (2021)
- Sonic the Hedgehog 2 (2022)
- Napoleon (2023)
