= Bill George (visual effects supervisor) =

American visual effects supervisor

Bill George (born September 28, 1958) is a visual effects supervisor who is known for his work for Industrial Light & Magic on, amongst others, the Star Trek franchise.

== Biography ==
During his teens, Bill George was a dedicated and talented model maker. He used to forage through the dumpsters outside the Van Nuys, Los Angeles facility of Industrial Light & Magic, hoping to find souvenirs. In 1979, he began his career, building miniatures for Greg Jein in Los Angeles. In 1981, he joined Industrial Light & Magic. Over the years, he has worked in a variety of capacities. He has been a model shop supervisor, art director, matte painter and visual effects supervisor. Some career highlights include miniature construction and design on Blade Runner, art direction and design for five Star Trek feature films, directing over thirty television commercials at ILM and overseeing model construction on Ghostbusters II and Alive.

In 1988, George received the Best Visual Effects Academy Award for his work on Innerspace.

== Awards ==
Year	Organisation	Work	Category/award	Result	Ref.
2005	77th Academy Awards	Harry Potter and the Prisoner of Azkaban	Best Visual Effects	Nominated	
1988	60th Academy Awards	Innerspace	Best Visual Effects	Won	

== Select filmography ==
Year	Work	Role	Ref.
2007	Evan Almighty	Visual Effects Supervisor (ILM)	
2006	Pirates of the Caribbean: Dead Man's Chest	Additional Visual Effects Supervisor (ILM)	
2004	Harry Potter and the Prisoner of Azkaban	Visual Effects Supervisor (ILM)	
2003	Stuck on You	Visual Effects Supervisor	
2002	E.T. Special Edition	Visual Effects Supervisor (ILM)	
2002	Harry Potter and the Chamber of Secrets	Visual Effects Supervisor (ILM)	
2001	Planet of the Apes	Visual Effects Supervisor	
1999	Galaxy Quest	Visual Effects Co-supervisor	
1999	Star Wars: Episode I – The Phantom Menace	Additional Matte Painter (ILM)	
1998	Deep Impact	Visual Effects Co-supervisor	
1996	Star Trek: First Contact	Art Consultant	
1994	Star Trek Generations	Visual Effects Art Director (ILM)	
1993	Alive	Visual Effects Art Director	
1991	Star Trek VI: The Undiscovered Country	Visual Effects Art Director	
1990	Joe Versus the Volcano	Model Shop Supervisor	
1989	Always	Visual Effects Art Director	
1989	Ghostbusters II	Model Shop Supervisor (ILM)	
1989	The 'burbs	Visual Effects Art Director	
1988	Caddyshack II	Visual Effects Art Director	
1987	Innerspace	Visual Effects Co-supervisor	
1985	The Goonies	Chief Model Maker (ILM)	
1984	Indiana Jones and the Temple of Doom	Model Maker	
1984	Star Trek III: The Search for Spock	Spacecraft and prop designer	
1983	Return of the Jedi	Model Maker	
1982	Star Trek II: The Wrath of Khan	Model Maker	
1979	Star Trek: The Motion Picture	Model Maker	
