= Scott Squires =

American visual effects supervisor

Scott Squires (born November 7, 1956) is an American visual effects supervisor and director. His first film project was Close Encounters of the Third Kind, where he developed the Cloud Tank Effect. In 1979 Squires, Hoyt Yeatman, Rocco Gioffre, Fred Iguchi, Tom Hollister and Bob Hollister co-founded Dream Quest Images, a visual effects house, which was later purchased by Disney. Squires was president of Dream Quest and left in 1985 to work for Industrial Light and Magic. Squires worked as visual effects supervisor and commercial director at ILM for 20 years and is now a freelance director and visual effects supervisor.

While at ILM, Squires received an Academy Technical Award for Input Scanning and received Academy Award nominations for The Mask, Dragonheart, and Star Wars: Episode I – The Phantom Menace.
