= Hoyt Yeatman =

American visual effects artist

- Born: Hoyt Horatio Yeatman Jr. January 23, 1955 (age 71); San Francisco, California, United States
- Occupations: Visual effects artist, visual effects supervisor
- Years active: 1977–present
- Spouse: Giselle Garavini
- Children: 1

Hoyt Yeatman (born January 23, 1955) is an American visual effects artist and supervisor. He has worked with Jerry Bruckheimer on a number of films, including Armageddon, Con Air, and The Rock. He made his directorial debut with the film G-Force. Yeatman is an alumnus of the UCLA School of Theater, Film and Television.

In 1979 Yeatman, Scott Squires, Rocco Gioffre, Fred Iguchi, Tom Hollister and Bob Hollister co-founded Dream Quest Images, a groundbreaking visual effects house, winning the Academy Award for Visual Effects in 1989 for the motion control and underwater effects in The Abyss. In 1996 Dream Quest was purchased by The Walt Disney Company, which became Disney's "The Secret Lab" in 1999. The Secret Lab closed its doors in 2002. He received an Academy Award for Technical Achievement in 1999.

== Filmography ==
=== Director ===
- G-Force (2009) (credited as Hoyt H. Yeatman Jr.)
