= Carlton W. Faulkner =

American sound engineer

- Born: June 7, 1904; Bay Hundred, Maryland, USA
- Died: January 28, 1967 (aged 62); Los Angeles, California, USA
- Other name: Carl W. Faulkner
- Occupation: Sound engineer
- Years active: 1955-1966

Carlton W. Faulkner (June 7, 1904 – January 28, 1967) was an American sound engineer. He won an Oscar in the category Sound Recording for the film The King and I. He was also nominated for four more Academy Awards, three in the same category and the fourth for Best Effects, Special Effects.

== Selected filmography ==
Faulkner won an Academy Award and was nominated for three more:

Won

- The King and I (1956)

Nominated

- Love Is a Many-Splendored Thing (1955)
- The Young Lions (1958)
- Journey to the Center of the Earth (1959) (Best Sound and Best Effects)
