= Danny Lee (special effects artist) =

Special effects artist (1919–2014)

- Born: Daniel West Lee; July 9, 1919; Wisconsin
- Died: November 28, 2014 (aged 95); Prescott, Arizona
- Occupation: Special effects artist
- Years active: 1955–1980

Daniel West Lee (July 9, 1919 – November 28, 2014) was an American special effects artist. He was known for his work on Arthur Penn's Bonnie and Clyde, most notably orchestrating the film's famous, bullet-ridden finale in which the title duo are killed in a hail of gunfire. He was also known for contributing effects work to over fifty live-action features for The Walt Disney Company between 1959 and 1980, including Mary Poppins, The Love Bug, The Mystery in Dracula's Castle, The Million Dollar Dixie Deliverance, Shadow of Fear, and Academy Award-winning work on Bedknobs and Broomsticks.
