= Slaughter (surname) =

Family name

Slaughter is a surname.

Notable people having this surname include:

- A. J. Slaughter (born 1967), American-Polish basketball player
- Anne-Marie Slaughter (born 1958), American lawyer and political scientist
- Anthony Slaughter (born 1962), British politician
- Carolyn Slaughter (born 1946), writer
- Christopher Columbus Slaughter (1837–1919), American rancher, cattle drover and breeder, banker and philanthropist
- Enos Slaughter (1916–2002), Hall of Fame baseball player
- Fenton M. Slaughter (1826–1897), American politician
- Frank G. Slaughter (1908–2001), novelist
- Fred Slaughter (1942–2016), American basketball player and sports agent
- Gabriel Slaughter (1767–1830), American politician, Governor of Kentucky
- George Webb Slaughter (1811–1895), American Baptist minister, cattle breeder and drover, and rancher in Texas
- Jake Slaughter (born 2002), American football player
- James E. Slaughter (1813–1900), American Army lieutenant
- Jim Slaughter (1928–1999), American professional basketball player
- John Horton Slaughter (1841–1922), American lawman
- Julia Cornelia Slaughter (1850–1905), American artist
- Juliette Slaughter (1945–2012), English racing driver
- Karin Slaughter (born 1971), writer
- Louise Slaughter (1929–2018), American politician
- Marcus Slaughter (born 1985), basketball player
- Mark Slaughter (born 1964), lead singer of Slaughter (band)
- Matthew J. Slaughter (born 1969), economist and Dean of the Tuck School of Business at Dartmouth College
- Nugent Slaughter (1888–1968), special effects designer
- Rebecca Slaughter (born c. 1983), acting chair of the Federal Trade Commission
- Samuel Slaughter (1848–1910), American businessman; Washington state pioneer and politician
- Sandra Slaughter (died 2014), American software engineer and management scientist
- Sean Slaughter (born 1976), American Christian hip hop musician
- Susan Slaughter, American orchestral trumpet player
- Tracey Slaughter (born 1972), New Zealand writer and poet
- Walter Slaughter (1860–1908), composer
- Webster Slaughter (born 1964) American football player
- William B. Slaughter (politician) (1797–1879), American politician
- William B. Slaughter (rancher) (1852–1929), American rancher

== See also ==
- Slaughter (disambiguation)
- Sgt. Slaughter (born 1948), stage name of Robert Rudolph Remus, a pro wrestler
