= Kalmar Bloodbath =

Kalmar Bloodbath may refer to:

- Kalmar Bloodbath (1505)
- Kalmar Bloodbath (1599)
