= Widger =

Widger is a surname. Notable people with the surname include:

- Chris Widger (born 1971), American baseball player
- Mike Widger (1948–2016), American player of Canadian football

== See also ==
- Widgery
- Wiger
