= 1st Academy Awards =

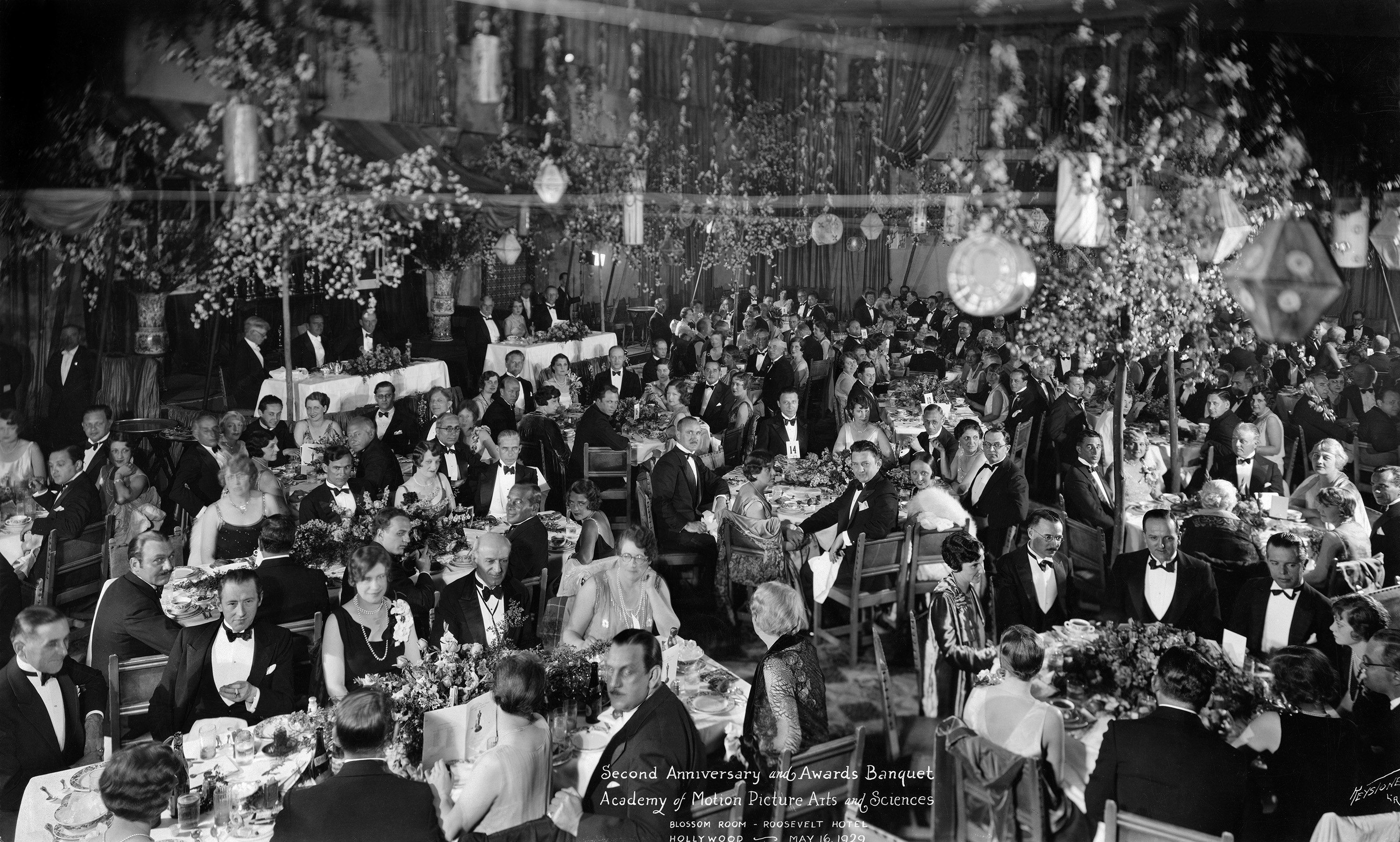
- The first Academy Awards ceremony (pictured) was held at the Hollywood Roosevelt Hotel.
- Date: May 16, 1929
- Site: Hollywood Roosevelt Hotel; Hollywood, Los Angeles, California, U.S.
- Hosted by: Douglas Fairbanks

Highlights
- Best Picture: Wings
- Most awards: 7th Heaven and Sunrise (3 each)
- Most nominations: 7th Heaven (5)

The 1st Academy Awards ceremony, presented by the Academy of Motion Picture Arts and Sciences (AMPAS) and hosted by AMPAS president Douglas Fairbanks, honored the best films from August 1, 1927, to July 31, 1928, and took place on May 16, 1929, at a private dinner held at the Hollywood Roosevelt Hotel in Los Angeles, California. Tickets cost $5 ($94 in 2025, considering inflation); 270 people attended the event, which lasted 15 minutes. It is the only Academy Awards ceremony not broadcast on either radio or television; a radio broadcast was introduced for the 2nd Academy Awards.

During the ceremony, AMPAS presented Academy Awards – later to be colloquially known as "Oscars" – in 12 categories. The winners had been announced three months ahead of the ceremony. Some nominations did not reference a specific film, such as Ralph Hammeras and Nugent Slaughter, who were nominated for Engineering Effects, a category that was dropped the following year – along with those for Unique and Artistic Production, Best Director (Comedy), and Best Title Writing. Unlike later ceremonies, an actor could be awarded for multiple films: Emil Jannings won Best Actor for his work in both The Way of All Flesh and The Last Command, while Best Actress winner Janet Gaynor was honored for three films. Charlie Chaplin and Warner Brothers each received an honorary award. Jannings, a Swiss-born performer who gained fame in Berlin, had been notified in advance of his victory; he subsequently posed for pictures with his statuette before leaving for Germany.

Major winners at the ceremony included 7th Heaven and Sunrise, with three awards apiece (the latter winning for Unique and Artistic Picture), and Wings receiving two awards, including Outstanding Picture. The academy decided retroactively that Wings's award was its highest honor the following year and dropped Unique and Artistic Picture.

== Background ==
Louis B. Mayer, the founder of the Louis B. Mayer Pictures Corporation, which would later merge into Metro-Goldwyn-Mayer (MGM), established the Academy of Motion Picture Arts and Sciences (AMPAS) in 1927. Mayer's purpose in creating the award was to unite the five branches of the film industry: actors, directors, producers, technicians, and writers. Mayer commented on the creation of the awards: "I found that the best way to handle [filmmakers] was to hang medals all over them ... If I got them cups and awards, they'd kill themselves to produce what I wanted. That's why the Academy Award was created." Mayer asked Cedric Gibbons, art director of MGM, to design an Academy Award trophy. Nominees were notified through a telegram in February 1928. In August 1928, Mayer contacted the first Academy Central Board of Judges to decide the winners. However, according to the American director King Vidor, the voting for the Academy Award for Best Picture was in the hands of the AMPAS founders: Mayer, Douglas Fairbanks, Sid Grauman, Mary Pickford, and Joseph Schenck.

== Ceremony ==
The ceremony was held on May 16, 1929, at the Hollywood Roosevelt Hotel, located in Los Angeles. It consisted of a private dinner with 36 banquet tables, where 270 people attended, and tickets cost $5 (equivalent to $94 in 2025). Actors and actresses arrived at the hotel in luxury vehicles, and gathered outside to cheer the attendees. The ceremony was not broadcast on radio, and was hosted by AMPAS president Fairbanks during a 15-minute event.

=== Overview ===
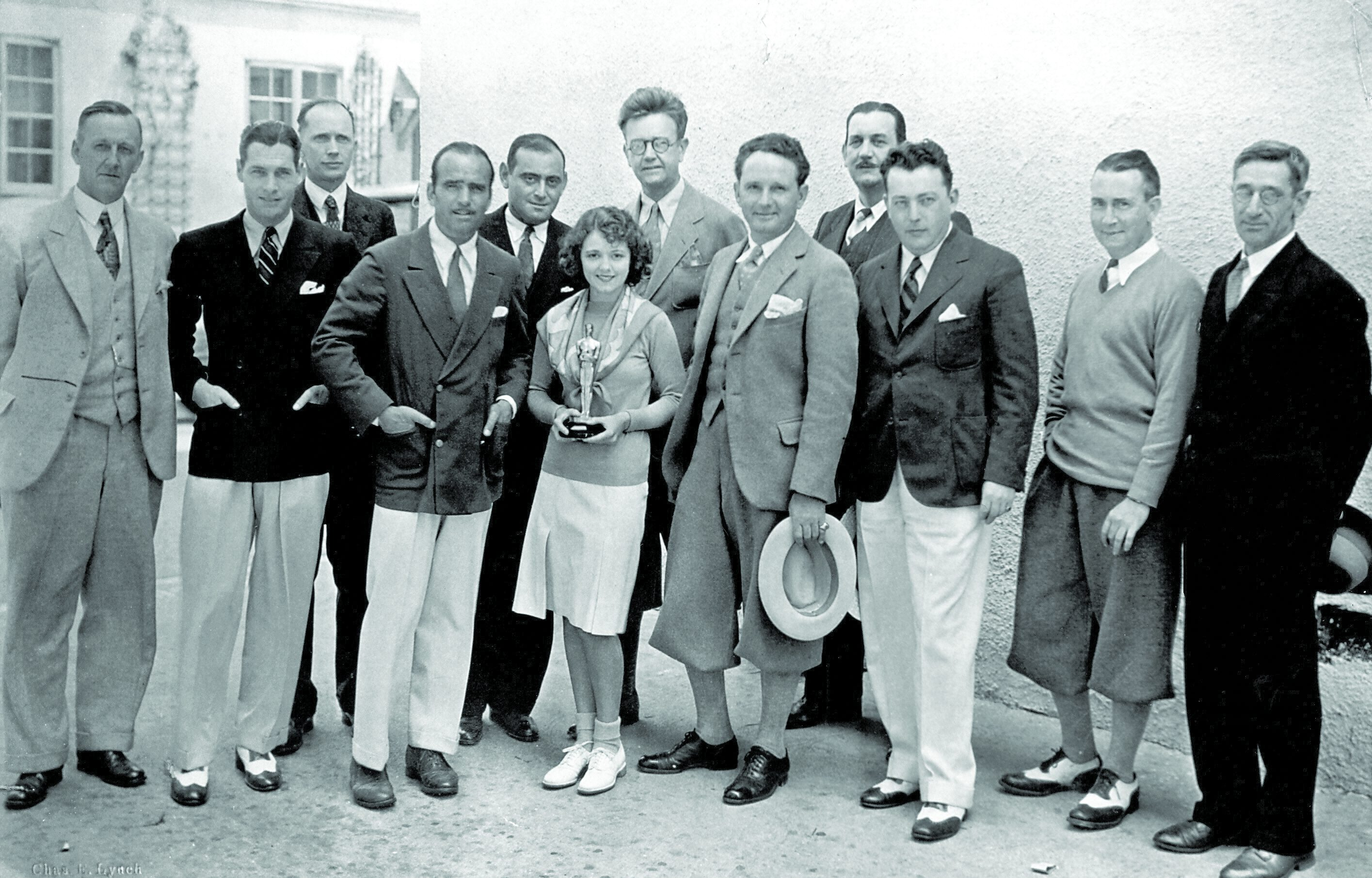
Members of the Academy of Motion Picture Arts and Sciences (AMPAS) in 1929. Janet Gaynor (center) holds her statuette for Best Actress.

The winners were announced three months before the ceremony. The recipients included: Emil Jannings, the inaugural award recipient for Best Actor (The Way of All Flesh and The Last Command); Janet Gaynor for Best Actress (7th Heaven, Street Angel, and Sunrise: A Song of Two Humans); Frank Borzage for Best Director, Drama (7th Heaven); Lewis Milestone for Best Director, Comedy (Two Arabian Knights); and Wings for Best Picture (which was the most expensive film produced up to that time).

Two Special Award were also presented, to Charles Chaplin and Warner Bros. Chaplin, who was nominated multiple times for the 1928 film The Circus (Best Actor, Best Writer, and Best Director, Comedy), was instead honored for his overall contribution to the industry, while Warner Bros. was awarded for pioneering talking pictures with The Jazz Singer (1927).

Three categories were eliminated for subsequent presentations: Best Engineering Effects, Best Title Writing, and Best Unique and Artistic Quality of Production. The major film studios received the majority of awards: Fox Film Corporation, Metro-Goldwyn-Mayer, Paramount Pictures, Radio-Keith-Orpheum, and Warner Bros.

== Winners and nominees ==
=== Awards ===
At the 1st Academy Awards (1927–1928), the nomination process allowed candidates to be nominated and awarded for a single film, multiple films, or without reference to any specific film.

Nominees were announced on February 2, 1929. Winners are listed first, in boldface.

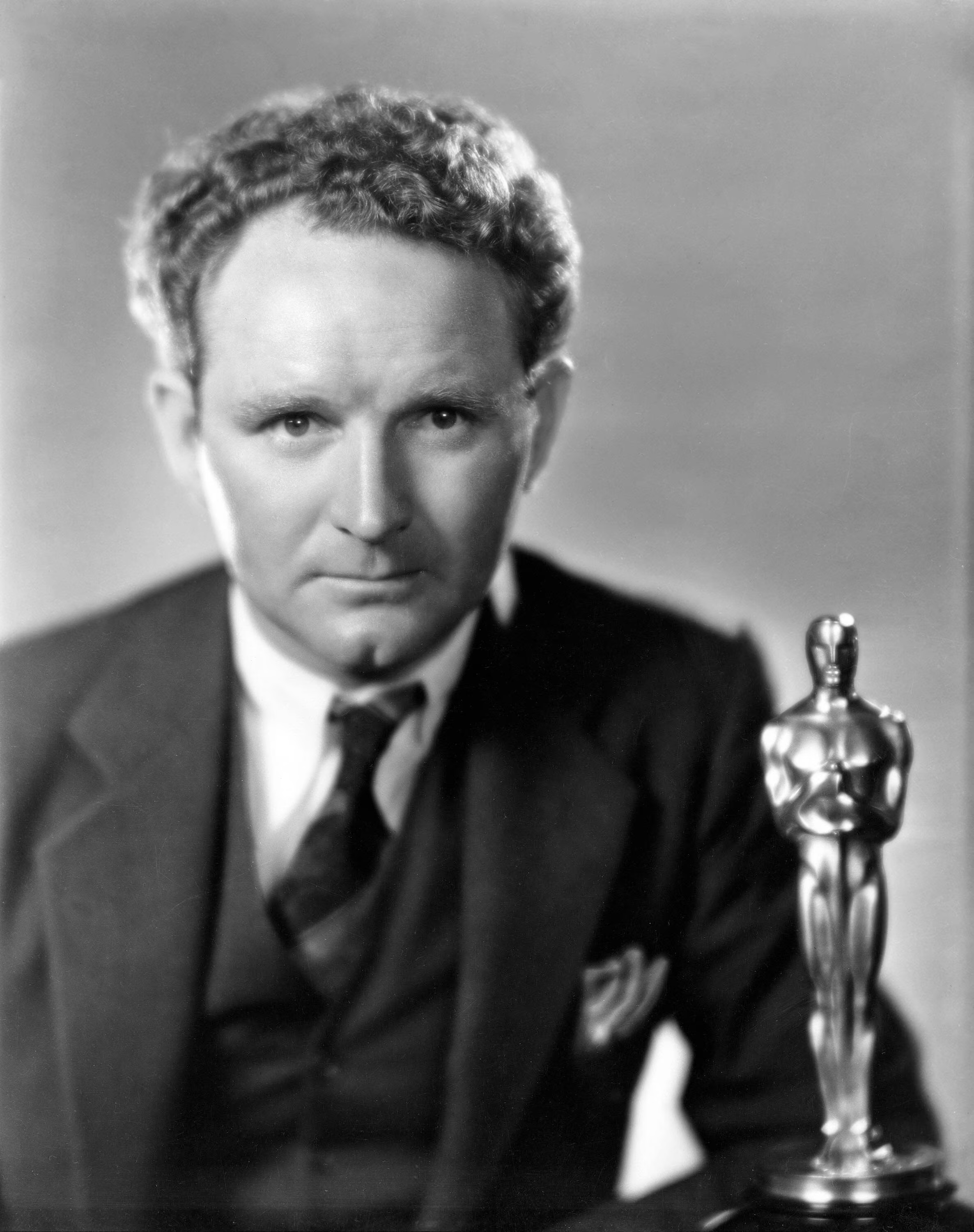
Frank Borzage, Best Directing (Dramatic Picture) winner

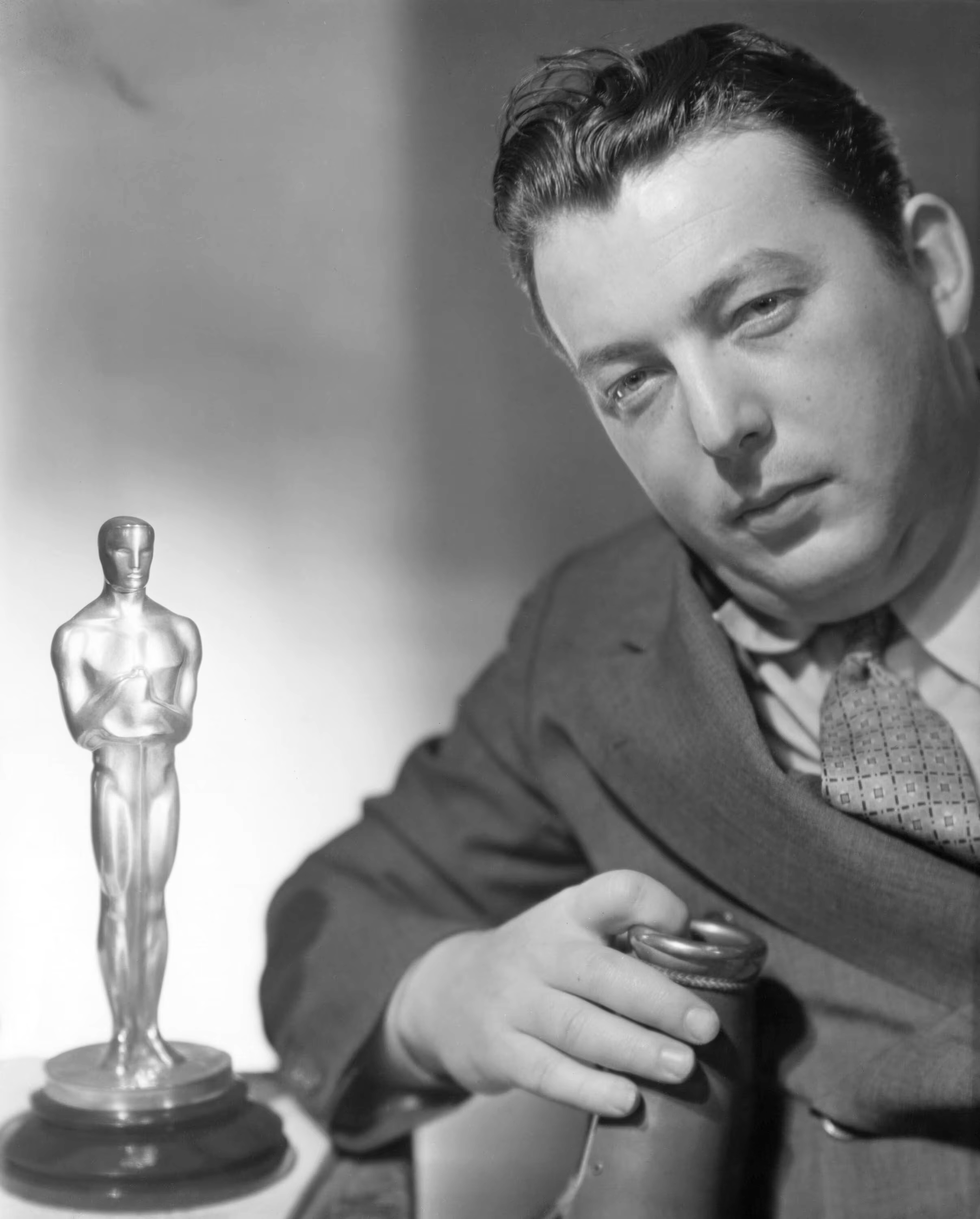
Lewis Milestone, Best Directing (Comedic Picture) winner

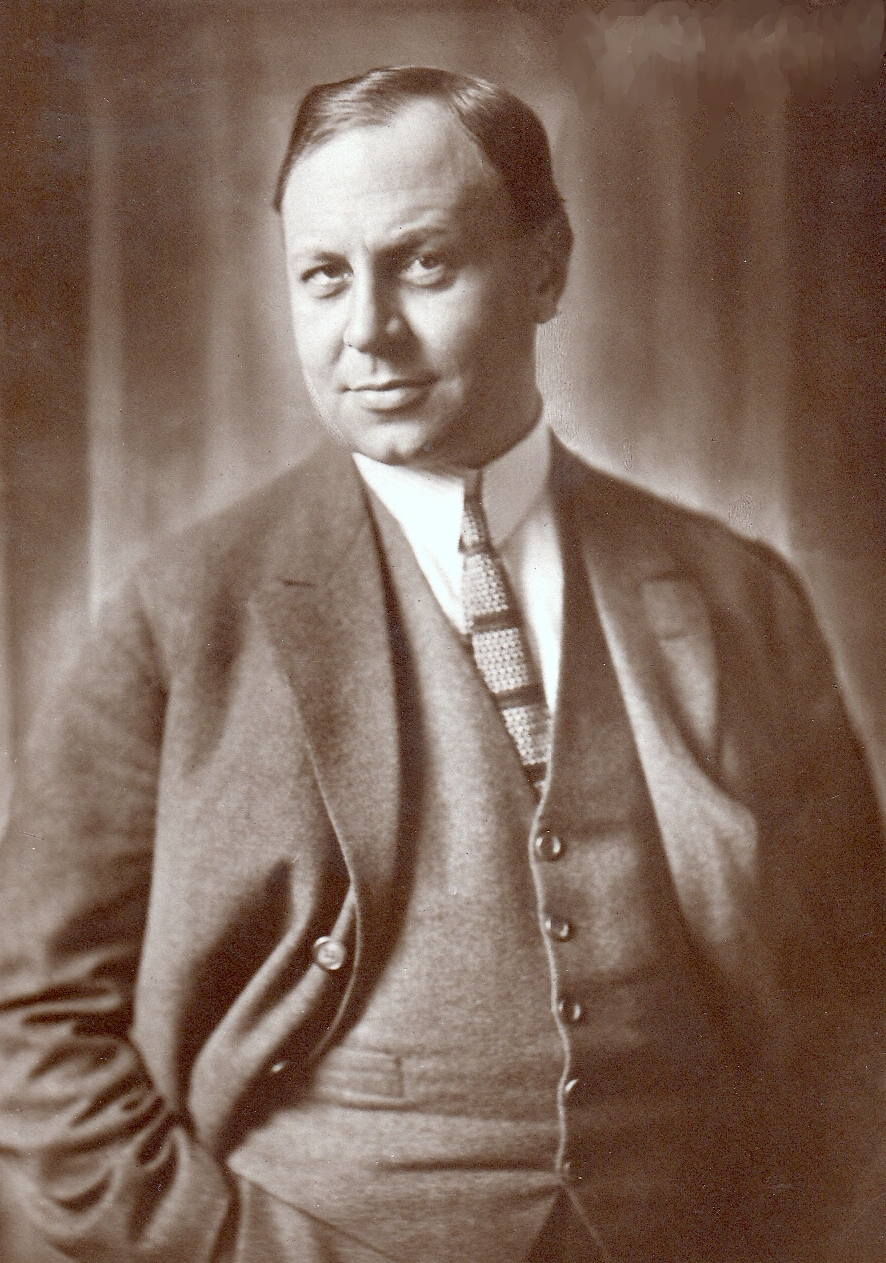
Emil Jannings, Best Actor winner

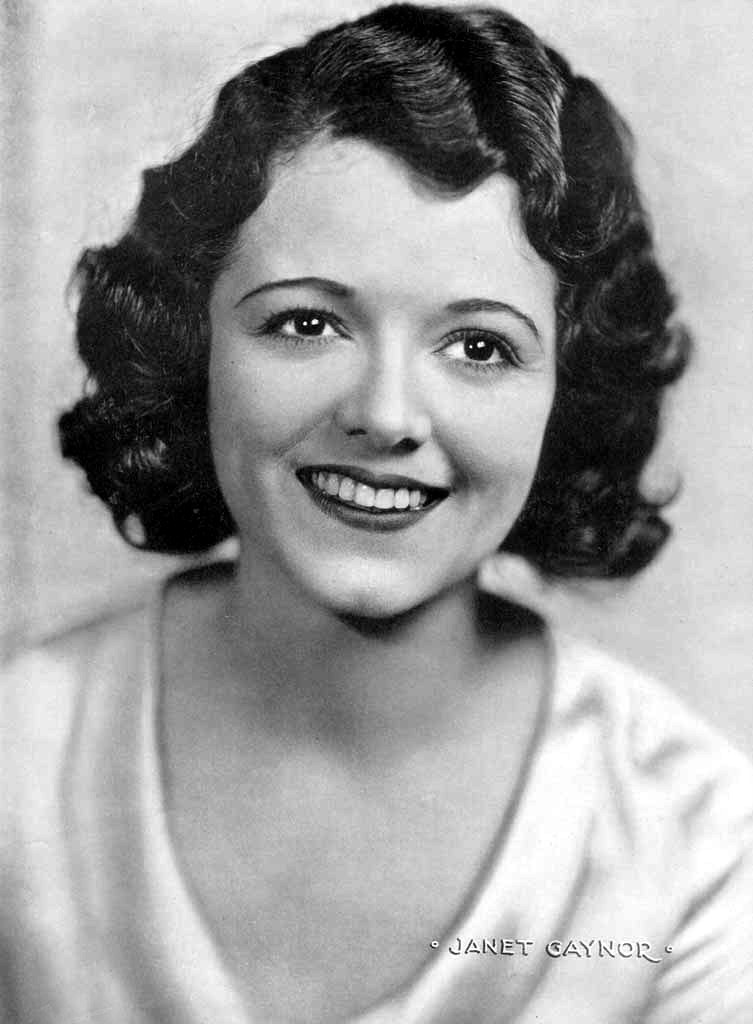
Janet Gaynor, Best Actress winner

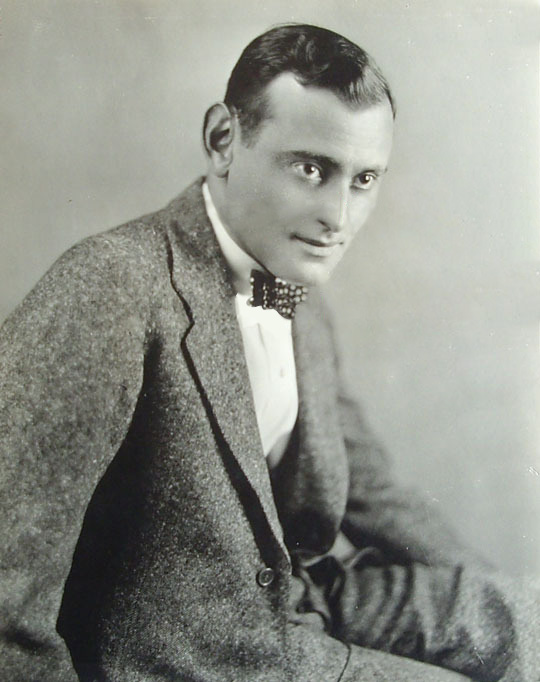
Benjamin Glazer, Best Adapted Screenplay winner

**Outstanding Picture**: **Wings – Paramount Famous Lasky**; The Racket – The Caddo Company; 7th Heaven – Fox	**Best Unique and Artistic Picture**: **Sunrise – Fox**; Chang – Paramount Famous Lasky; The Crowd – Metro-Goldwyn-Mayer
**Best Directing (Dramatic Picture)**: **Frank Borzage** – **7th Heaven**; Herbert Brenon – Sorrell and Son; King Vidor – The Crowd	**Best Directing (Comedy Picture)**: **Lewis Milestone** – **Two Arabian Knights**; Charles Chaplin – The Circus (Note: The Circus originally received three nominations: Best Director (Comedy Picture), Best Actor, and Best Writing (Original Story) – for Charles Chaplin. However, the Academy subsequently decided to remove Chaplin's name from the competitive award categories and instead to confer upon him a Special Award "for acting, writing, directing and producing The Circus".); Ted Wilde – Speedy
**Best Actor**: **Emil Jannings** – **The Last Command** **as General Dolgorucki (Grand Duke Sergius Alexander)** and **The Way of All Flesh** **as August Schilling**; Richard Barthelmess – The Noose as Nickie Elkins and The Patent Leather Kid as The Patent Leather Kid; Charles Chaplin – The Circus as A Tramp	**Best Actress**: **Janet Gaynor** – **7th Heaven as Diane**, **Street Angel as Angela**, and **Sunrise as The Wife**; Louise Dresser – A Ship Comes In as Mrs. Pleznik; Gloria Swanson – Sadie Thompson as Sadie Thompson
**Best Writing (Original Story)**: **Underworld** – **Ben Hecht**; The Circus – Charles Chaplin; The Last Command – Lajos Biro	**Best Writing (Adaptation)**: **7th Heaven** – **Benjamin Glazer**; Glorious Betsy – Anthony Coldeway; The Jazz Singer – Alfred Cohn
**Best Writing (Title Writing)**: **Joseph Farnham** – no specific film; Gerald Duffy (Note: Gerald Duffy's nomination for Best Writing (Title Writing) was a posthumous nomination.) – The Private Life of Helen of Troy; George Marion Jr. – no specific film	**Best Art Direction**: **The Dove** – **William Cameron Menzies**; **Tempest** – **William Cameron Menzies**; 7th Heaven – Harry Oliver; Sunrise – Rochus Gliese
**Best Cinematography**: **Sunrise** – **Charles Rosher and Karl Struss**; The Devil Dancer – George Barnes; The Magic Flame – George Barnes; Sadie Thompson – George Barnes	**Best Engineering Effects**: **Wings** – **Roy Pomeroy**; No specific film – Ralph Hammeras; No specific film – Nugent Slaughter

=== Special awards ===
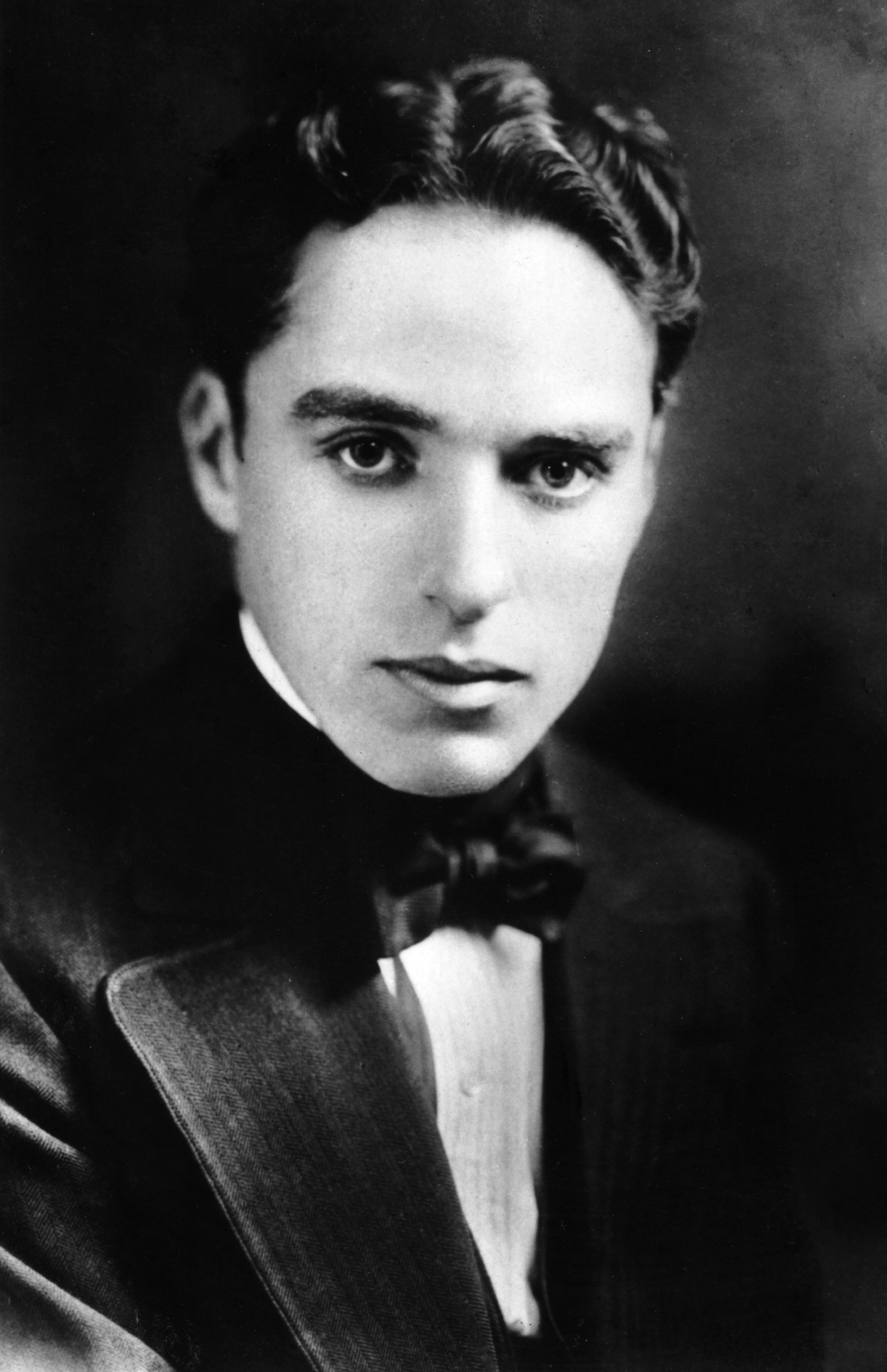
Charles Chaplin, Honorary Award

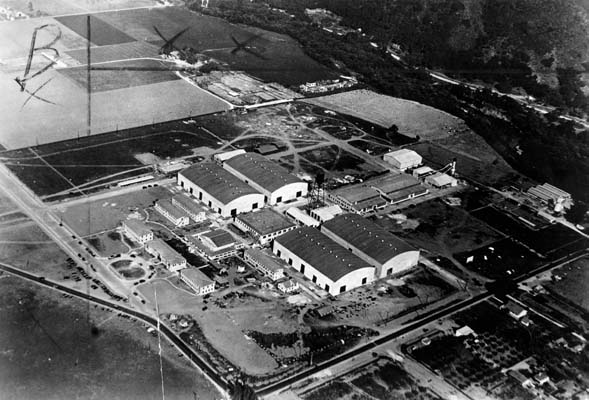
Warner Brothers Production, Honorary Award. First National Studios, Burbank (c. 1928) pictured

The following Honorary Awards – then called Special Awards – were conferred:

- To Charles Chaplin for acting, writing, directing and producing The Circus.
- To Warner Bros. for producing The Jazz Singer, the pioneer outstanding talking picture, which has revolutionized the industry.

== Multiple nominations and awards ==
The following six films received multiple nominations:

Nominations	Film
5	7th Heaven
4	Sunrise: A Song of Two Humans
3	The Circus (Withdrawn nominations)
2	The Crowd
2	The Last Command
2	Sadie Thompson
2	Wings

The following three films received multiple awards:

Awards	Film
3	7th Heaven
3	Sunrise: A Song of Two Humans
2	Wings

== Changes to Academy Awards ==
After the 1st Academy Awards (1927–1928), the following changes were made by the AMPAS:

- Award categories were reduced from twelve to seven:
  - The awards for Best Directing (Comedy Picture) and Best Directing (Dramatic Picture) were merged into a single Best Directing award.
  - The award for Best Engineering Effects was discontinued.
  - The award for Best Unique and Artistic Picture was discontinued.
  - The awards for Best Writing (Adaptation) and Best Writing (Original Story) were merged into a single Best Writing award. These categories would be separated again for the 4th Academy Awards.
  - The award for Best Writing (Title Writing) was discontinued.

== Gallery ==
Academy Award-winning and nominated films – 1st Academy Awards
The full film of Wings. It is the first film to win the Academy Award for Best Picture, which was at the time known as Outstanding Picture. Also won an award for the Best Engineering Effects.

The full film of Sunrise: A Song of Two Humans. It won the Academy Award for Best Unique and Artistic Picture, the only year that such a prize was awarded. The prize was intended to honor prestige art films separately from "commercial fare".

The full film of 7th Heaven

The full film of The Crowd

== See also ==
- 1927 in film
- 1928 in film

== Bibliography ==
- Cosgrave, Bronwyn (2007). Made for Each Other: Fashion and the Academy Awards (I ed.). New York, United States: Bloomsbury Publishing USA. ISBN 978-0-7475-7630-3. OCLC 74523691.
- Eyman, Scott (2005). Lion of Hollywood: the life and legend of Louis B. Mayer (I ed.). New York, United States: Simon & Schuster. ISBN 0-7432-0481-6. OCLC 57506846.
