= Widgery =

Widgery is a surname. Notable people with the surname include:

- Catherine Widgery (born 1953), American artist in public sculpture
- David Widgery (1947–1992), British Marxist writer, journalist, polemicist, physician, and activist
- Frederick John Widgery (1861–1942), English artist who painted landscapes and coastal scenery in Devon and Cornwall
- John Widgery, Baron Widgery (1911–1981), English judge, Lord Chief Justice of England and Wales (1971–80)
- Julia Widgery (1850–1905), American artist
- William Widgery (c.1753–1822), U.S. Representative from Massachusetts
