= Slaughter =

Slaughter may refer to:

== Animals ==
- Animal slaughter, the killing of animals for various purposes
  - Ritual slaughter, the practice of slaughtering livestock in a ritual manner
    - Dhabihah, the prescribed method of ritual slaughter of animals excluding camels, locusts, fish and most sea life in Islamic law
    - Shechita, the ritual slaughter of mammals and birds according to Jewish dietary laws

== Murder ==
- Murder
  - Manslaughter
  - Massacre
  - Mass murder

== People ==
- Slaughter (surname)
- Sgt. Slaughter (born 1948), stage name of Robert Rudolph Remus, a pro wrestler

== Places ==
- Lower Slaughter, in Gloucestershire, England
- Upper Slaughter, also in Gloucestershire
- Slaughter, Louisiana, US
- Slaughter, Washington, US renamed Auburn, Washington February 21, 1893
- Slaughter Lane, a former name of Brewer Street, Oxford, England

== Entertainment ==
=== Film and television ===
- Slaughter (1972 film), a film starring Jim Brown and Stella Stevens
- Snuff (film), originally titled Slaughter in 1972, retitled for its wider 1976 release
- Slaughter (2009 film), a film from After Dark Films
- "Slaughter" (Shameless), an episode of the American TV series Shameless
- "Slaughter" (Vice Principals), an episode of the American TV series Vice Principals

=== Music ===
- Slaughter (American band), an American hard rock band
- Slaughter (Canadian band), a Canadian thrash metal band
- "Slaughter" (song), Billy Preston's theme song to the 1972 film of the same name
- Slaughter (album), 2015, by Young Wicked
- The Slaughter, an album by American heavy metal band Incite
- Slaughter & the Dogs, a British punk band
- Slaughterhouse (group), an American hip hop group

== Other ==
- Chicago Slaughter, professional indoor football team
- Slaughter and May, a City of London law firm
- Slátur, an Icelandic food like haggis or blood pudding

== See also ==
- Bloodbath (disambiguation)
- Butchering
- Slaughterhouse, a facility where animals are slaughtered
