= Woman's Exchange Movement =

System of benevolent consignment stores

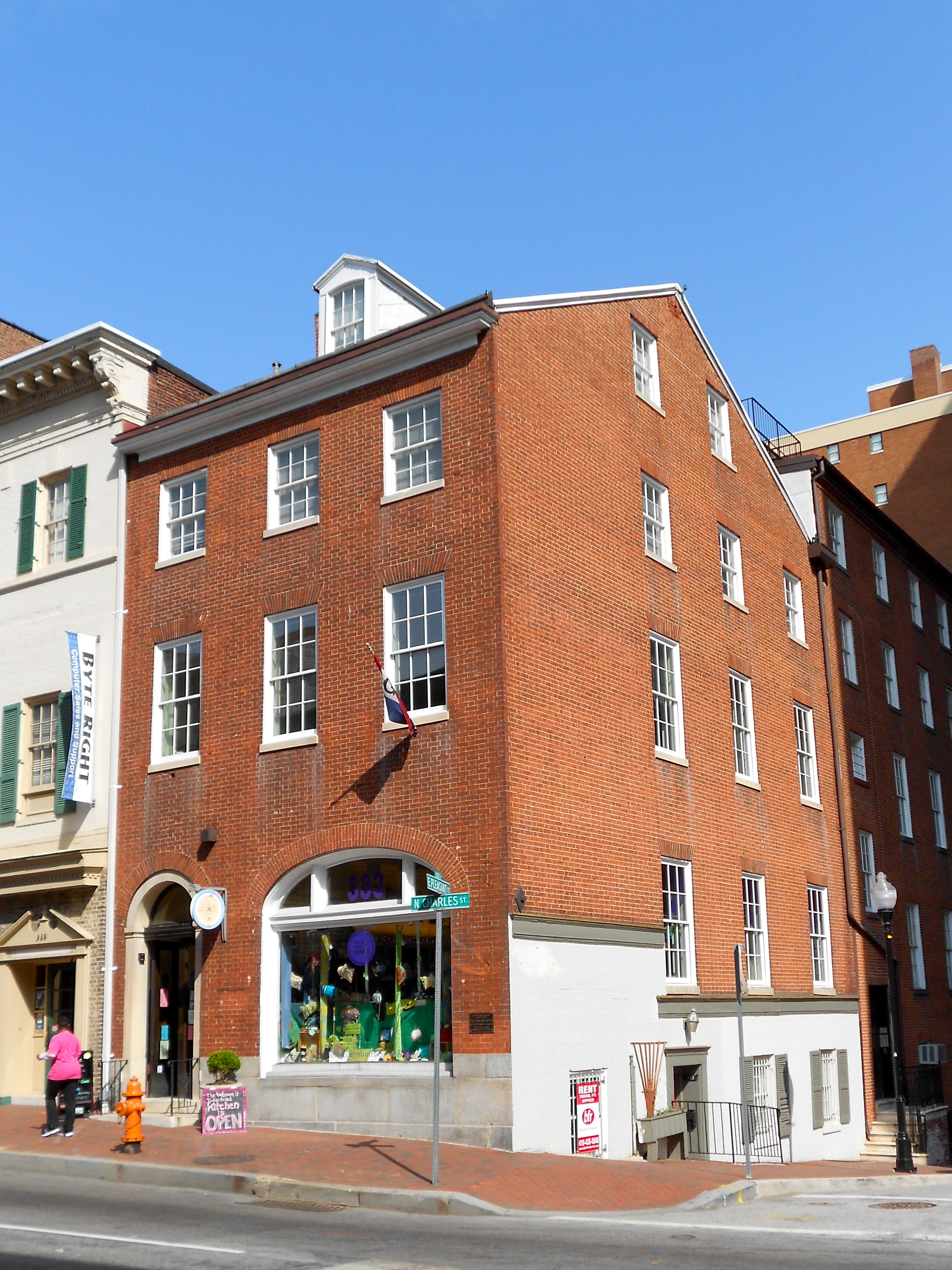
Woman's Industrial Exchange, Baltimore, Maryland

The Woman's Exchange Movement (or Women's Exchange Movement) refers to a system of benevolent consignment stores, usually established and managed by women, to benefit women. A number of them are members of the Federation of Woman's Exchanges (1934), which is still active.

== Background ==
The Woman's Exchange Movement in the United States dates to 1832, with the establishment of the Philadelphia Ladies' Depository.

Exchanges are non-profit establishments. In the 19th century they were mainly set up by philanthropic women, providing a setting for women to sell their embroidery, sewing, and fancywork. This allowed women to earn a living without working outside their homes. Initially, the exchanges in Philadelphia and New Brunswick appear to have catered for women who had seen better days and had now become self-supporting. At the time it was socially unacceptable for "genteel women" to work and the Women's Exchanges allowed them to sell their work anonymously. The managers and organizers of the exchanges added to their philanthropic status. These women were also able to use their entrepreneurial skills in a socially acceptable way.

Many exchanges added tearooms and lunchrooms, which provided more revenue and became fashionable meeting places for upper-class women. While almost all the exchanges were unsuccessful as businesses, they nevertheless set high standards for the items they accepted, charging a commission of only 10 percent on sales. Consumers were therefore able to benefit from an interesting selection of hand-made articles at interesting prices.

While many depositories and exchanges were local or regional operations, the Federation of Woman's Exchanges was established in 1934 and is still active. While the Woman's Exchange Movement continued through the twentieth century and some exchanges are still in business, the movement has faded, due to a changing work force, rising rents, and a resistance to high-priced, hand-made merchandise.

== Select list of 19th-century Women's Exchanges ==
A table of Woman's Exchanges from 1832 through 1891 compiled from the 1891 publication Directory of Exchanges for Woman's Work and other sources.

Name	City	State	Year founded
Woman's Exchange	Albany	New York	1881
Woman's Industrial Exchange	Atchison	Kansas	1888
Woman's Exchange	Augusta	Georgia	1888
Woman's Industrial Exchange	Baltimore	Maryland	1880
Women's Educational and Industrial Union	Boston	Massachusetts	1880
Exchange for Woman's Work	Bridgeport	Connecticut	1887
Exchange for Woman's Work	Bristol	Rhode Island	1885
Brooklyn Female Employment Society	Brooklyn	New York	1854
Woman's Exchange	Buffalo	New York	1886
Exchange for Woman's Work	Charleston	South Carolina	1885
Exchange for Woman's Work	Charlottesville	Virginia	1888
Exchange for Woman's of Work Chicago	Chicago	Illinois	1879
Cincinnati Ladies' Depository	Cincinnati	Ohio	1868
Woman's Exchange	Cincinnati	Ohio	1883
Woman's Exchange	Cleveland	Ohio	1890
Woman's Exchange	Columbus	Ohio	1885
Woman's Exchange	Decatur	Illinois	1889
Woman's Exchange	Denver	Colorado	1886
Exchange for Woman's Work	Detroit	Michigan	1889
Exchange for Woman's Work	Duluth	Minnesota	1889
Woman's Exchange	Elizabeth	New Jersey	1887
Woman's Work Exchange	Englewood	New Jersey	1884
United Workers and Woman's Exchange	Hartford	Connecticut	1888
Woman's Exchange	Houston	Texas	1887
Woman's Exchange	Jackson	Illinois	1891
Woman's Exchange	Lancaster	Pennsylvania	1885
Woman's Exchange	Lexington	Kentucky	1885
Woman's Exchange	Little Rock	Arkansas	1887
Woman's Industrial Exchange	Los Angeles	California	1887
Woman's Exchange	Louisville	Kentucky	1885
Woman's Exchange	Lynchburg	Virginia	1890
Woman's Exchange	Madison	Wisconsin	1887
Exchange for Woman's Work	Memphis	Tennessee	1887
Woman's Industrial Exchange	Milwaukee	Wisconsin	1882
Women's Work and Art Exchange	Morristown	New Jersey	1885
Woman's Exchange	Mount Vernon	New York	1888
Depository of the Union for Good Works	New Bedford	Massachusetts	1881
Woman's Depository and Exchange	New Brunswick	New Jersey	1856
Christian Woman's Exchange	New Orleans	Louisiana	1881
Exchange for Woman's Work	New York	New York	1878
Madison Avenue Depository and Exchange for Woman's Work	New York	New York	1886
Harlem Exchange for Woman's Work	New York	New York	1888
Exchange for Woman's Work	Newark	New Jersey	1881
Woman's Exchange	Newport	Rhode Island	1887
Woman's Work Exchange	Norfolk	Virginia	1884
Exchange for Woman's Work	Northampton	Massachusetts	1888
Woman's Exchange	Oshkosh	Wisconsin	1890
Philadelphia Ladies' Depository	Philadelphia	Pennsylvania	1832
Exchange for Woman's Work	Philadelphia	Pennsylvania	1888
Pittsburgh Ladies' Depository	Pittsburgh	Pennsylvania	1873
Woman's Industrial Exchange	Pittsburgh	Pennsylvania	1886
Woman's Exchange	Plainfield	New Jersey	1889
Rhode Island Exchange for Woman's Work	Providence	Rhode Island	1881
Exchange for Woman's Work	Richmond	Virginia	1883
Rochester Art Exchange	Rochester	New York	1880
Woman's Work Exchange	San Antonio	Texas	1890
Woman's Industrial Exchange	San Diego	California	1887
Woman's Exchange	San Francisco	California	1885
Woman's Industrial Exchange	Santa Barbara	California	1890
Woman's Exchange	Springfield	Illinois	1886
Woman's Exchange	St. Joseph	Missouri	1886
St. Louis Ladies' Depository	St. Louis	Missouri	1879
Woman's Exchange	St. Louis	Missouri	1883
Woman's Work Exchange	St. Paul	Minnesota	1882
Exchange for Woman's Work	Stamford	Connecticut	1885
Exchange for Woman's Work	Staunton	Virginia	1890
Ladies' Exchange	Topeka	Kansas	1889
Woman's Exchange	Troy	New York	1887
Woman's Exchange	Utica	New York	1888
Woman's Exchange	Washington, DC		1890
Woman's Exchange	Waterbury	Connecticut	1890
Woman's Exchange	Wichita	Kansas	1889

== Prominent women in the Exchange Movement ==
- Louisa May Alcott, founder of the Women's Educational and Industrial Union, Boston
- Sara Dary Armbruster, founder of the Woman's Exchange, Philadelphia
- Margaret W. Bartlett, founder of the Christian Woman's Exchange, New Orleans
- Ida Wikoff Baker, first president of the Woman's Exchange, Decatur, Illinois
- Mrs. G. Harmon Brown, founder of the Woman's Industrial Exchange, Baltimore
- Mary Atwater Choate, founder of the New York Exchange for Women's Work
- Harriet Clisby, founder of the Women's Educational and Industrial Union, Boston
- Elizabeth Bacon Custer, founder of the New York Exchange for Women's Work
- Abby Morton Diaz, founder of the Women's Educational and Industrial Union, Boston
- Julia Ward Howe, founder of the Women's Educational and Industrial Union, Boston
- Grace Carew Sheldon, founder of the Woman's Exchange, Buffalo
- Candace Wheeler, founder of the New York Exchange for Women's Work

== See also ==
- Sarasota Woman's Exchange (founded 1962)
