= Bloodbath (disambiguation) =

Bloodbath is a Swedish death metal supergroup from Stockholm.

Bloodbath may also refer to:

== Crimes ==
=== Other terms for Bloodbath ===
- Mass murder
- Massacre, an indiscriminate killing or slaughter

=== Swedish massacres ===
- Kalmar Bloodbath (1505), a massacre by king John of Denmark
- Stockholm Bloodbath, a 1520 massacre in Stockholm
- Nydala Abbey Bloodbath, a 1520 execution of an abbot and several monks by Christian II of Denmark
- Ronneby Bloodbath, a 1564 massacre in the then-Danish city of Ronneby by the Swedish army
- Kalmar Bloodbath (1599), an execution of Sigismund loyalists on the order of Duke Charles
- Åbo Bloodbath, an execution of Sigismund's followers by the end of the war against Sigismund
- Linköping Bloodbath, a massacre of the defeated advisers of King Sigismund

== Media ==
- Blood Bath, a 1966 horror thriller directed by Jack Hill and Stephanie Rothman
- Bloodbath, the UK title for the 1971 Italian horror thriller directed by Mario Bava, Twitch of the Death Nerve
- "Bloodbath" (NCIS), a 2006 episode of NCIS

== Music ==
- Bloodbath (album), 2012 album by Suicidal Angels
- "BLOODBATH", a song by 6arelyhuman and asteria
- OMB Bloodbath (born 1993), American rapper from Houston, Texas

== Other uses ==
- 1945 VFL grand final, an Australian rules football game commonly known as "the Bloodbath"
- Bloodbath of B-R5RB, an historic Eve Online battle involving 7500+ players
