= Julia Cornelia Slaughter =

American artist and community leader

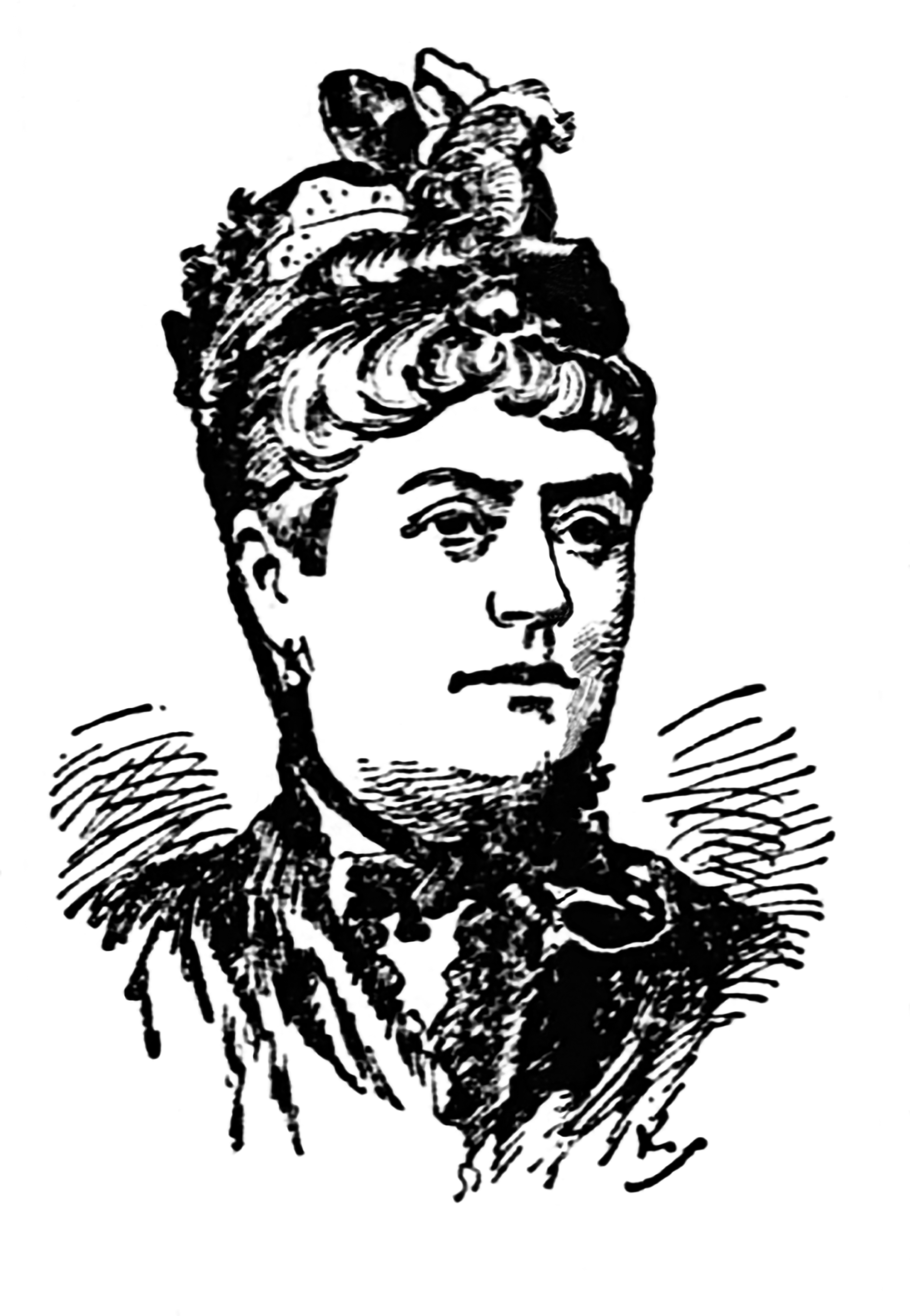
- Born: Julia Cornelia Widgery; 1850; Exeter, Devonshire, England
- Died: 1905 (aged 54–55); West Cardiff, Wales
- Burial place: St. David's Church Cemetery, Exeter, England
- Occupations: Painter; co-founder and president of the Tacoma Art League (later Tacoma Art Museum); Washington Fair Commissioner during the World's Columbian Exposition; Cotton States and International Exposition lady commissioner
- Organizations: Tacoma Art League; Woman's Exchange organization; Washington State Cooperation Society; National Academy of Design; American Art Association
- Known for: American painter and community leader of Washington State. Slaughter was often in charge of art departments in different state and country exhibitions and social gatherings. Co-founded the Tacoma Art League (later Tacoma Art Museum) and art leagues in a number of other Washington State cities.
- Spouse: Samuel C. Slaughter (married in 1889– 1905)
- Father: William Widgery
- Relatives: Frederick John Widgery(brother)

Julia Cornelia Slaughter (née Widgery; 1850–1905) was an American artist and community leader. She started her career as a painter in England, creating portraits and landscapes in oil, watercolor, and pastel. Later, she focused on still lifes and landscapes. In about 1876, she moved to New York and exhibited in major city exhibitions, including the National Academy of Design, American Art Association, and Society of American Artists. Slaughter spent some time in San Francisco and arrived in Tacoma in 1891, where in later years she was highly esteemed in social and art circles.

Slaughter co-founded and was twice elected president of the Tacoma Art League, which later developed into the Tacoma Art Museum. She was the founder and president of the Washington State Cooperation Society; a member of the Ferry Museum Board of Trustees (and the only female member of that time); the first female member of the American Art Union; and the second vice president of the Woman's Exchange organization in Tacoma.

Slaughter was one of the Washingtonian commissioners for the World's Fair of 1893. As superintendent of the Department of Fine Art, she collected a vast array of art pieces from around the state for the Fair exhibition. She is credited for creating art leagues in Seattle, Spokane, Walla Walla, Olympia, Fairhaven and Whatcom (later Bellingham). She was also president of the Lady Commissioners during the Atlanta Cotton States exposition in 1895.

== Early life and family ==
Slaughter was born in 1850 in Exeter, Devonshire, England. She was the daughter of landscape painter William Widgery, and one of her relatives on father's side was the well-known English painter Joseph Mallord William Turner, whose work was exhibited in the National Gallery and considered "the pride of English nation." Slaughter's brother, Frederick John Widgery, studied in European art schools of Europe and became a painter of landscapes.

== Education and first exhibitions ==
Slaughter started studying art in English schools at 14 years old. She worked with oil, watercolor and pastel, and painted both portraits and landscapes. In 1872, she exhibited her first works at the Society of British Artists exhibition on Suffolk Street in London.

== Career ==
=== New York City ===
Approximately in 1876, Slaughter settled in New York and lived there until 1888. She worked as a realist painter, creating still-life paintings and landscapes. During her life in New York, she exhibited her artwork in the "major Annual Exhibitions" of the city, including the National Academy of Design, American Art Association, and Society of American Artists.

=== Tacoma, Washington ===
Slaughter moved to Tacoma in 1891, and later became highly esteemed in social circles of the city. She was known as a "prominent Tacoma artist," and was an active member in the city's in musical, literary, artistic and philanthropical societies.

In late 1880s, Slaughter founded an art league in Tacoma, but it closed after its first exhibition. Later, she co-organized the Tacoma Art League to promote art among Tacoma citizens. It was officially formed on October 28, 1908, and later developed into the Tacoma Art Museum. It held annual exhibitions in the city and was estimated as a "very successful organization" of that period. Over the years, Slaughter was elected president of the league two times, as well as chairing the committees and serving as treasurer. She also became a charter member of the literary club Aloha, founded by league members in 1892.

==== World's Fair Exposition of 1893 ====
In 1893, the Chicago World's Fair (also named World's Columbian Exposition), was held to celebrate the 400th anniversary of Christopher Columbus' arrival in the New World in 1492. In 1891, the Washington State Legislature created a World's Fair Commission to organize Washington state exhibits for the Chicago Fair. Appointed superintendent of the Department of Fine Art in 1891, Slaughter spent several years working for the commission. Her duties were to visit various art centers and organize art leagues across the state. She attracted state artists' attention to Washington state scenery, influenced them to make art pieces depicting it, and collected pieces for the World's Fair exhibition.

In the course of this work, Slaughter organized art leagues in different state cities, including Seattle, Spokane, Walla Walla, Olympia, Fairhaven, and Whatcom (later Bellingham).

==== Other activity and memberships ====
In 1895, Slaughter was elected president of Lady Commissioners, an organization created to work at the Atlanta Cotton States exposition.

She was the founder and president of the Washington State Cooperation Society, which was created to support and popularize Washingtonian home industries. In 1903, Slaughter was on the Board of Trustees of the Ferry Museum, which was considered "Tacoma's most notable public institution." At the time, she was the only female member of the board.

Slaughter was a member of the American Art Union and its first female member. She was the second vice president of the Tacoma Woman's Exchange organization.

== Personal life and death ==
For a period of time, Julia Widgery was known under the name of Julia Grisworld, and under that name exhibited paintings in New York in 1876–1888. American art historian Peter H. Falk concluded that she was briefly married at the time. In 1889, she went to San Francisco and married Samuel C. Slaughter, a pioneer real estate businessman and politician of Tacoma.

Slaughter was diagnosed with cancer in 1905. That year, she went to West Cardiff, Wales, where she later died.

== See also ==
- Frederick John Widgery
- Samuel C. Slaughter
- Tacoma Art Museum
- World's Columbian Exposition
- Cotton States and International Exposition
- Society of American Artists
- Royal Society of British Artists

== Literature cited ==
- "Tacoma Art League records", washingtonhistory.org, Tacoma: Washington State Historical Society
- Ehrmann, Thierry (ed.), "Julia C. Widgery Slaughter (1850 – 1905)", artprice.com, Lyon: ArtPrice
- "Fine arts of the state", Spokane Chronicle, Spokane: Cowles Company, p. 5, 16 December 1891, LCCN sn86072020, OCLC 14374699
- "Seattle art league", Seattle Post-Intelligencer, Seattle: Leigh S. J. Hunt, p. 5, 16 April 1892, ISSN 2379-7304, LCCN sn83045604, OCLC 9563195
- "Decorations of the fair", Seattle Post-Intelligencer, Seattle: Leigh S. J. Hunt, p. 5, 26 September 1892, ISSN 2379-7304, LCCN sn83045604, OCLC 9563195
- Meany, Edmond S.; Evans, Elwood, eds. (1893), The State of Washington: a brief history of the discovery, settlement and organization of Washington, the "Evergreen state," as well as a compilation of official statistics showing the material development of the state up to date, Tacoma: World's Fair Commission of the State of Washington, OCLC 977688916
- "Art at the World's fair", Seattle Post-Intelligencer, Seattle: Leigh S. J. Hunt, p. 4, 1 January 1893, ISSN 2379-7304, LCCN sn83045604, OCLC 9563195
- "Lady commissioners meet", Seattle Post-Intelligencer, Seattle: Leigh S. J. Hunt, p. 2, 13 February 1895, ISSN 2379-7304, LCCN sn83045604, OCLC 9563195
- "Art league is for all", The Spokesman-Review, Spokane: Cowles Company, p. 18, 13 March 1904, ISSN 1064-7317, LCCN sn84024754, OCLC 11102610
- Falk, Peter Hastings, ed. (1999), Who was who in American art, 1564–1975: 400 years of artists in America, Madison: Sound View Press, ISBN 0932087574, LCCN 2001271878, OCLC 1037537967
- Edwards, Jonathan (1900), An Illustrated History of Spokane County, State of Washington (PDF), San Francisco: W. H. Lever, LCCN 02002233, OCLC 4873043
- Falk, Peter Hastings, "Julia Cornelia Widgery Slaughter (1850 – 1905)", askart.com, Kentfield: askART
- Graves, Algernon (1884), A dictionary of artists who have exhibited works in the principal London exhibitions of oil paintings from 1760–1880, London: George Bell & Sons, OCLC 4970975
- Hunt, Herbert (1916), Tacoma its history and its builders; a half century of activity, vol. 1, Chicago: S. J. Clarke Publishing Company, LCCN 18005073, OCLC 656923949
- Prosser, William Farrand (1903), Lewis, Edward Gardner (ed.), A history of the Puget Sound country, its resources, its commerce and its people, New York City: Edward Gardner Lewis, LCCN 05013767
- Sharylen, Maria (1993), Artists of the Pacific Northwest: a biographical dictionary, Jefferson: McFarland & Co., ISBN 0899507972, LCCN 92056693, OCLC 877688312
