= Wiger =

Wiger is a surname. Notable people with the surname include:

- Chuck Wiger (born 1951), American politician
- Merete Wiger (1921–2015), Norwegian novelist, author of short stories, children's writer and playwright
- Nick Wiger (born 1980), American comedian, improviser, podcast personality, and television writer
