= Samuel Slaughter =

Samuel Clarence Slaughter
- Born: 1848; Culpeper County, Virginia, U.S.
- Died: May 23, 1910 (aged 61–62); Tacoma, Washington, U.S.
- Resting place: Oakwood Cemetery; Tacoma Washington, U.S.
- Occupations: Tacoma City Controller; real estate businessman
- Organization: Pierce County Democratic Club
- Known for: Washington State politician and real estate businessman. Served as Tacoma City Controller and contributed to the city's development and commercial growth.
- Political party: Democrat
- Spouse: Julia Widgery Slaughter (married 1889–1905)

Samuel Clarence Slaughter (1848 – May 23, 1910) was a New York banker and then a pioneer, real estate investor, and politician in Tacoma, Washington. Slaughter started his career in New York working for the banking firm Norton, Slaughter & Company for more than fifteen years. He came to Tacoma in 1883 and entered real estate. After over twenty years in the field, Slaughter was highly esteemed in Washington state real estate circles. He worked at Moore & Slaughter, and later was the chief partner at S. C. Slaughter & Company. He was known as a figure who contributed to city development and commercial growth.

Politically, Slaughter was a Democrat, and a member of the Democratic Club of Pierce County. He ran for the position of Tacoma City Controller several times and was elected in 1892, being the only Democratic candidate to succeed in that year's election cycle. He worked as City Controller for two years.

== Early life, family and education ==
Slaughter was born in 1848 in Culpeper County, Virginia, where he grew up and was educated. Slaughter's father was Dr. Philip C. Slaughter, a Confederate Army surgeon during the American Civil War and a chief surgeon at Camp Lee. His ancestors came from Wales to settle in America in 1620. Slaughter's mother was Mary Slaughter (McDonald), whose ancestors came to America from Scotland.

== Career ==
=== New York ===
After getting secondary school education, Slaughter went to New York and became a businessman there. He worked in the well-known banking firm of that time Norton, Slaughter & Company. Slaughter worked and lived in New York for more than fifteen years.

=== Real estate business ===
Slaughter moved to Tacoma in 1882, becoming a pioneer real estate businessman of Washington State. At the time of his arrival, the area, was covered in forests.

In one of his first real estate dealings, he sold a lot located at the corner of Pacific Avenue and 11th street. That area later became "one of the most prominent" business areas of Tacoma, and the piece of land sold by Slaughter became the site for the Pacific National Bank.

Slaughter closed many real estate deals for property that later turned into well-known landmarks of the city. According to Prosser, one of the Washington State Historical Society founders, Slaughter closed more deals than the majority of other businessmen in the field at the time.

Around 1884–1885, Slaughter operated from a business building located on the northwest corner of Pacific Avenue and 13th Street. There, he worked in partnership with Henry K. Moore in the real estate and law firm called Moore & Slaughter. By 1903, Slaughter became chief partner in the firm S. C. Slaughter & Company. In his twenty years of real estate dealings in Tacoma, he was considered one of the "most progressive and enterprising citizens," and noted for his contributions to the city's development and commercial growth.

=== Political activity in Tacoma ===
Politically, Slaughter was a Democrat and a member of the Democratic Club of Pierce County.

In 1890, Slaughter was nominated for the position of the Chairman of the County Commissioners, but he changed his mind to run in the Tacoma City Controller race. He lost to Republican candidate J. H. Houghton.

On April 5, 1892, Slaughter ran for City Controller again, and this time was elected. He was the only Democratic nominee to succeed in that year's elections, and worked at the position for two years.

== Personal life ==
In 1889, Slaughter married Julia C. Widgery in San Francisco. She was born in England, but later moved to America. She became well known in Tacoma as the founder of the Washington State Cooperative Society, the only female trustee for the Ferry Museum, and the president of the Tacoma Art League (which later developed into the Tacoma Art Museum).

In 1908, Slaughter was struck and injured by a car belonging to the Tacoma Railway & Power Company. The accident resulted in lawsuit filed in the Superior Court in 1909 for $2,000 ($53,000 in 2020 dollars (Note: The approximate value converted to 2020 dollars, based on a standard adjustment of the 1913 dollar value using the Consumer Price Index as calculated by United States Department of Labor.)).

On May 23, 1910, Slaughter died in Tacoma of heart disease. He was buried in Oakwood Cemetery in Tacoma.

== See also ==
- Julia Widgery Slaughter
- Culpeper County, Virginia

== Literature cited ==
- "CPI Inflation Calculator", Bureau of Labor Statistics, Washington: United States Department of Labor
- "Peritz & Co. and Other Businesses, Pacific Avenue and Thirteenth Street, Tacoma", washingtonhistory.org, Tacoma: Washington State Historical Society
- Curley, Rob, ed. (August 19, 1890), "Editor notes", Spokane Daily Chronicle, Spokane: Cowles Company, p. 4, LCCN sn88085302, OCLC 61313128
- Curley, Rob, ed. (October 4, 1890), "Pierce County convention", Spokane Daily Chronicle, Spokane: Cowles Company, p. 1, ISSN 2690-7178, LCCN sn84024754, OCLC 61313128
- "Fine arts of the state", Spokane Chronicle, Spokane: Cowles Company, p. 5, December 16, 1891, LCCN sn86072020, OCLC 14374699
- "Art at the World's fair", Seattle Post-Intelligencer, Seattle: Leigh S. J. Hunt, p. 4, January 1, 1893, ISSN 2379-7304, LCCN sn83045604, OCLC 9563195
- Scripps, Edward, ed. (July 7, 1909), "Wants damages", The Tacoma Times, Tacoma: E. W. Scripps Company, p. 5, ISSN 2158-4729, LCCN sn88085187, OCLC 17347623
- Scripps, Edward, ed. (January 13, 1910), "Damage suit against car company on", The Tacoma Times, Tacoma: E. W. Scripps Company, p. 1, ISSN 2158-4729, LCCN sn88085187, OCLC 17347623
- Jackson, Sam, ed. (May 23, 1910), "Pioneer Tacoman dead", Oregon Daily Journal, Portland: Journal Print Co., p. 9, LCCN sn85042444, OCLC 12429002
- "Funeral of Samuel C. Slaughter", The Oregon Daily Journal, Tacoma, Washington, p. 8, May 24, 1910
- Hunt, Herbert (1916), Tacoma its history and its builders; a half century of activity, vol. 1, Chicago: S. J. Clarke Publishing Company, LCCN 18005073, OCLC 656923949
- Prosser, William Farrand (1903), Lewis, Edward Gardner (ed.), A history of the Puget Sound country, its resources, its commerce and its people, New York City: Edward Gardner Lewis, LCCN 05013767
