= Peter H. Falk =

American art historian (born 1950)

Peter Hastings Falk (born 1950) is an American art historian, advisor and publisher. Falk is a graduate of Brown University (Art History, 1973) and of the Rhode Island School of Design (Architecture, 1976). He is a professional appraiser. He is also the U.S. Senior Advisor for Artprice.com.

In 1993, Falk began publishing Art Price Index International. In 1996 he became Editor-in-Chief of ArtNet and later Editor-in-Chief of AskArt. Since 2000, he has been Consulting Editor to Artprice. He publishes reference books on American art under his Falk Art Reference imprint (formerly Sound View Press). He is best known as the author of the biographical dictionary Who Was Who in American Art. It won the Wittenborn Award and American's Library Association's Outstanding Academic Title. He has also published books on conservation and art forensics.

== Works ==
- The Photographic Art Market (1981-on). The first index to photographs sold at auction, which evolved into
- Print Price Index (1991–93). Index to fine prints sold at auction, which evolved into
- Art Price Index International (1993–1999), which was subsumed by Artprice.com
- Who Was Who in American Art (1999). 3 vols. ISBN 978-0-932087-57-7 Winner of the Wittenborn Award for Best Art Reference book published in North America, awarded by ARLIS.
