= Frederick John Widgery =

English artist (1861–1942)

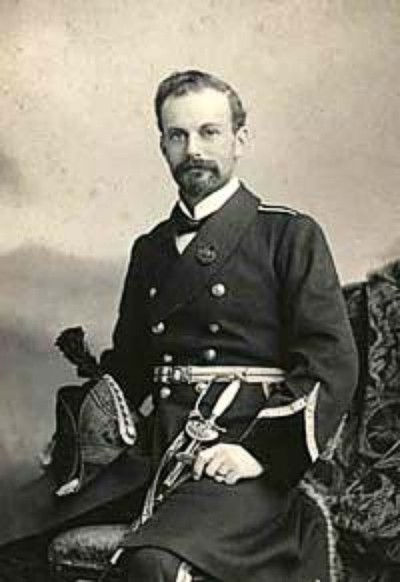

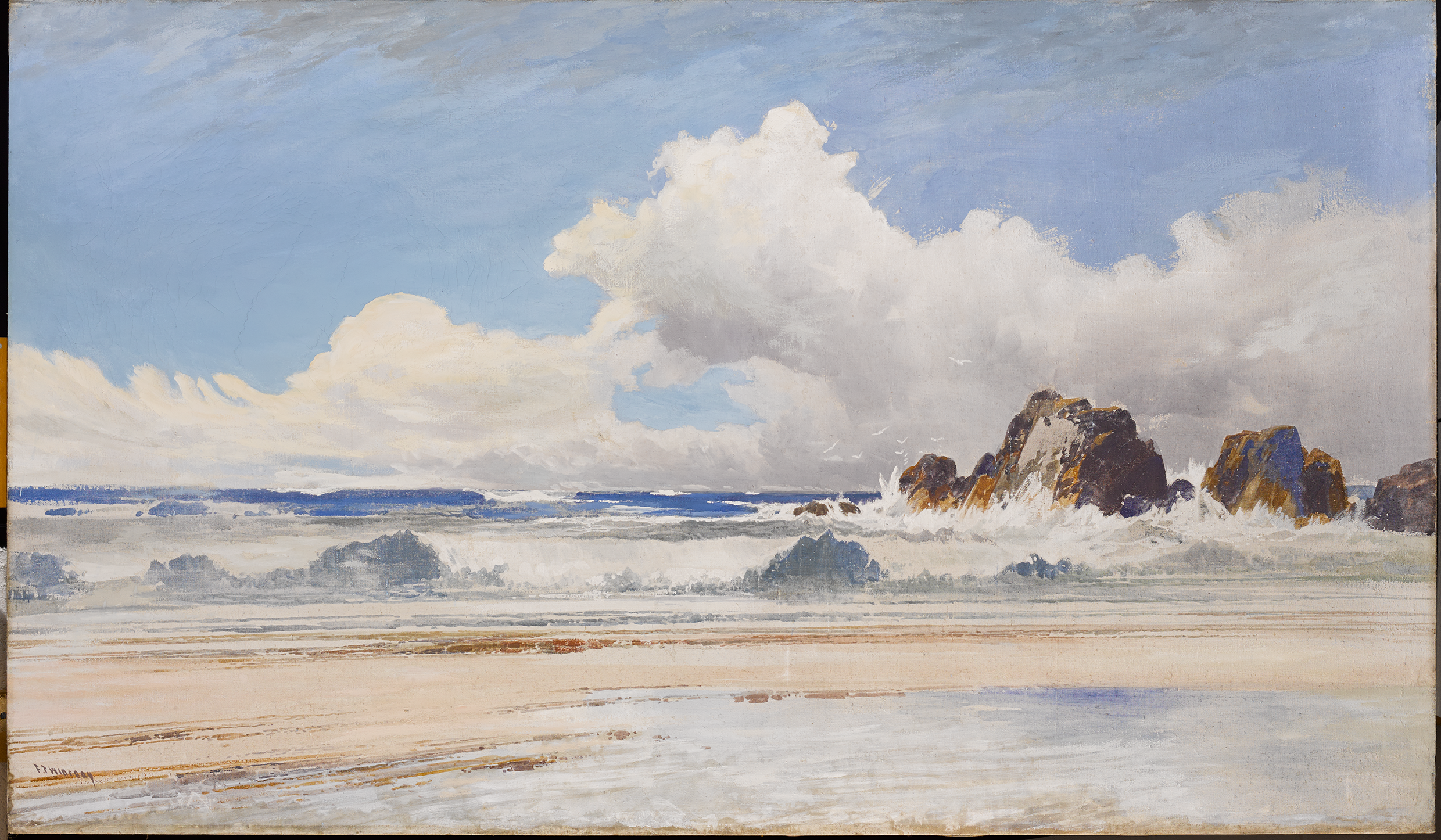
Beach scene, 1930s, Royal Albert Memorial Museum & Art Gallery, Exeter

Frederick John Widgery (May 1861 – 27 January 1942), was an English artist who painted landscapes and coastal scenery in Devon and Cornwall. He was Lord Mayor of Exeter in 1903-04.

He left the Royal Albert Memorial Museum & Art Gallery in Exeter over 500 works, mostly sketches.

Frederick was the younger son of William Widgery (1826–1893), a self-taught artist. He studied at the Exeter School of Art and went on to the South Kensington Museum School and then to Antwerp, studying under Charles Verlat at the National Art School. Returning to England, he studied at Hubert von Herkomer's School at Bushey in Hertfordshire and in 1903 became Mayor of Exeter. Frederick's sister, Julia (Widgery) Slaughter, was also a portrait and landscape painter.
