= Kalmar Castle =

Coordinates: 56.658°N 16.355°E

- Kalmar slott (Swedish)
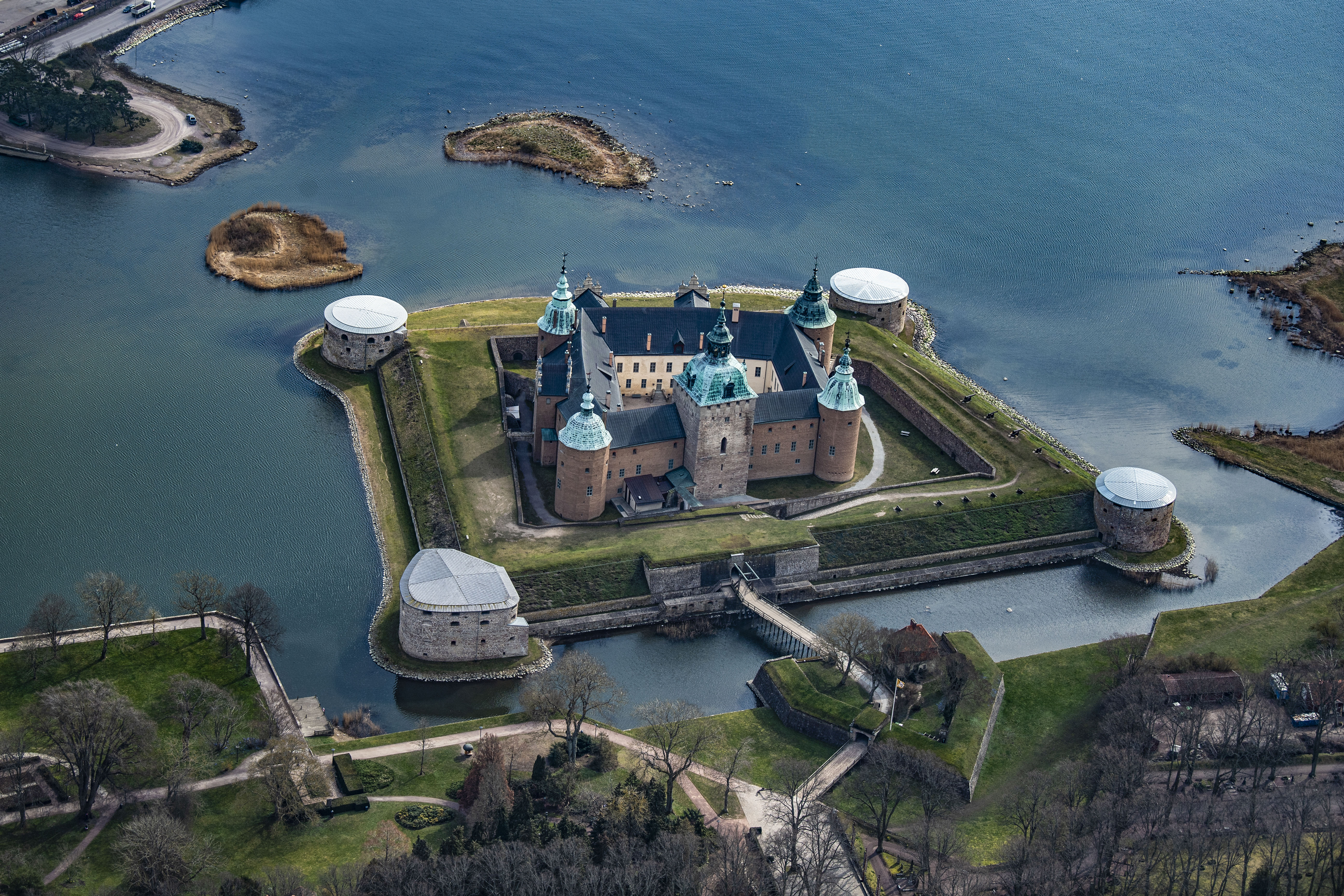
- Interactive map of Kalmar Castle
- Location: Kalmar, Småland, Sweden

Kalmar Castle (Swedish: Kalmar slott) is a castle in Kalmar, in the province of Småland, Sweden. Its origins date to the 12th century, with a defensive tower constructed on the site around 1180. Owing to its strategic location near the former border with Denmark, the castle was historically known as Rikets nyckel ("the Key to the Kingdom"). During the 16th century, the Vasa kings transformed the medieval fortress into a Renaissance palace; today, it is described by Statens fastighetsverk as the best-preserved Renaissance castle in the Nordic countries. In 1397, the castle was the site of the formation of the Kalmar Union, which united Denmark, Norway and Sweden under a common monarch.

== History ==
During the twelfth century a round defensive tower was built on Kalmarsund and a harbour constructed. At the end of the thirteenth century King Magnus Ladulås had a new fortress built with a curtain wall, round corner towers and two square gatehouses surrounding the original tower. Located near the site of Kalmar's medieval harbor, it has played a crucial part in Swedish history since its initial construction as a fortified tower in the 12th century.

One of the most significant political events in Scandinavian history took place at Kalmar Castle in 1397, when the Kalmar Union was formed, uniting Denmark, Norway and Sweden (then including Finland) under Queen Margaret I of Denmark. During the Swedish rebellion against Denmark in 1520, the fortress was commanded by Anna Eriksdotter (Bielke), who at the death of her spouse, Johan Månsson Natt och Dag, in the middle of the rebellion, took control over his fiefs and defended Kalmar against Denmark.

The fortress was improved during the 16th century under the direction of King Gustav I and his sons King Eric XIV and Johan III who turned the medieval fortress into a castle fit for a renaissance king. Upon ascending the throne, King Johan III of Sweden initiated an extensive reconstruction program for the castle, beginning almost immediately after his coronation. In 1574, the architect Domenicus Pahr commenced the renovation work. As part of the project, all towers, except for three—the southeastern, northeastern, and "Kuretornet"—were modified to achieve a uniform height, with their roofs covered in lead. Additionally, all windows were reshaped into squares, and the original roofing was replaced with a gable roof covered in clay. The king also ordered the facade to be painted white and the roof red. Following the completion of the castle's exterior, an interior renovation commenced in 1587, two years after Johan III's visit to the castle. Several rooms were remodeled, including "Gamla kungamaket" (the old throne room), "Rutsalen" (the chequer hall), and "Grå salen" (the grey hall). The "Nya kungamaket" (the new throne hall) was renovated to its present-day interior, incorporating decorative elements such as 2,200 gold-painted leaves.

The garrison was loyal to King Sigismund during the rebellion by Duke Charles, and continued to hold out even after Sigismund was decisively defeated at the Battle of Stångebro. The castle was therefore besieged by the Duke's forces in March 1599, and was compelled to surrender on 12 May. The three commanders were subsequently killed, along with nineteen other members of the garrison, in a mass execution traditionally known as the Second Kalmar Bloodbath.

Kalmar Castle suffered heavy damage during the Siege of Kalmar, the main engagement and namesake of the Kalmar War (1611–13), and was badly damaged by a fire in 1642. Repairs were begun, but from the end of the seventeenth century the castle was allowed to fall into disrepair.

== Restoration ==
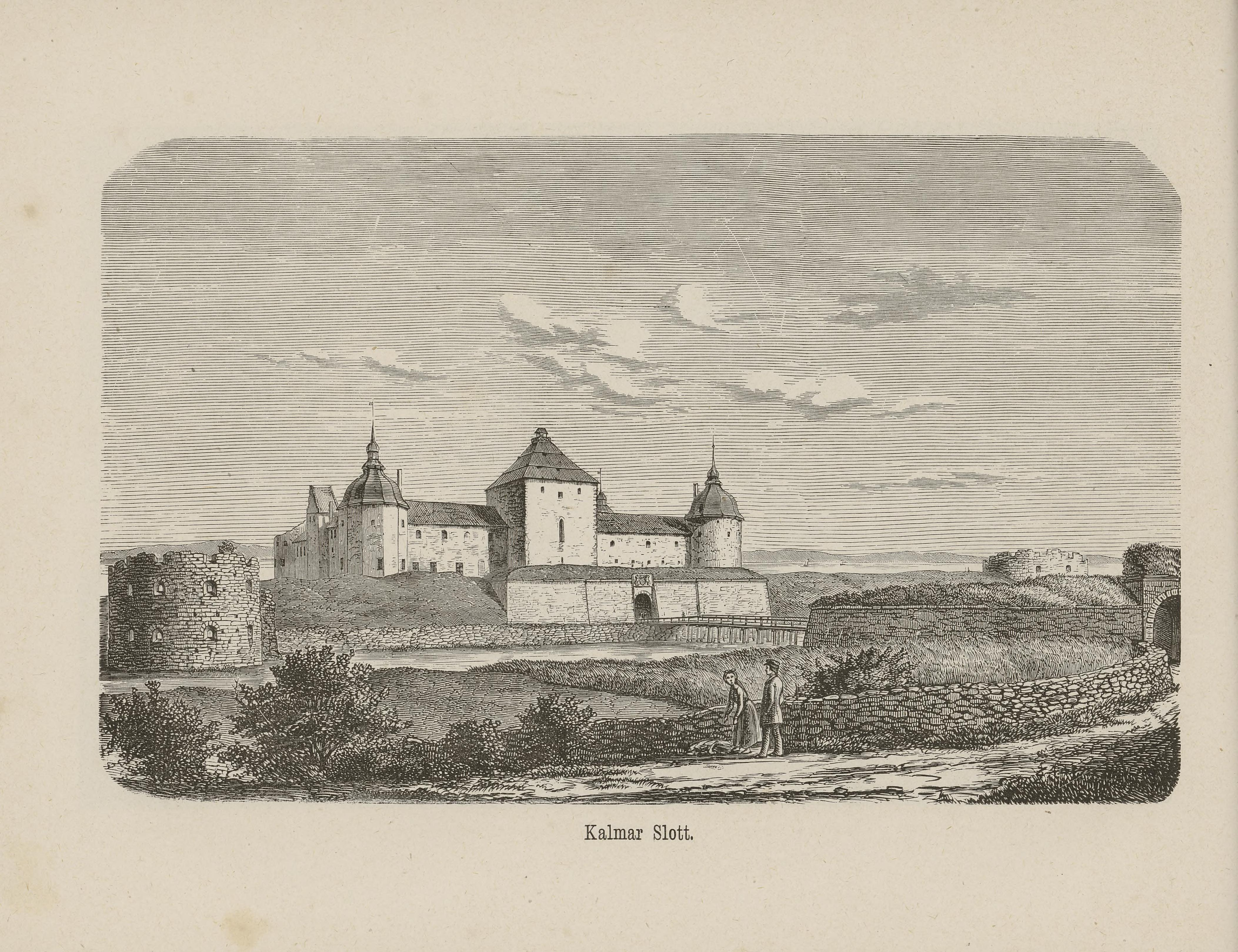
The castle before its latest reconstruction

In 1856, architect Fredrik Wilhelm Scholander (1816–1881) initiated reconstruction/restoration work at Kalmar Castle. His pupil Helgo Zettervall continued restoring Kalmar Castle in the 1880s. Architect Carl Möller drew up the plans and other documents. The work began in 1885 and by 1891 the castle had gained the silhouette it bears today. In 1919 Professor Martin Olsson was charged with the continuing restoration of earthworks, the moat, the bridge and the drawbridge. Work continued until 1941, when the castle was once more surrounded by water. Today, it is one of Sweden's best preserved renaissance castles and is open to the public.

SVT's Luciamorgon in December 2023 was celebrated inside the castle.

== Gallery ==
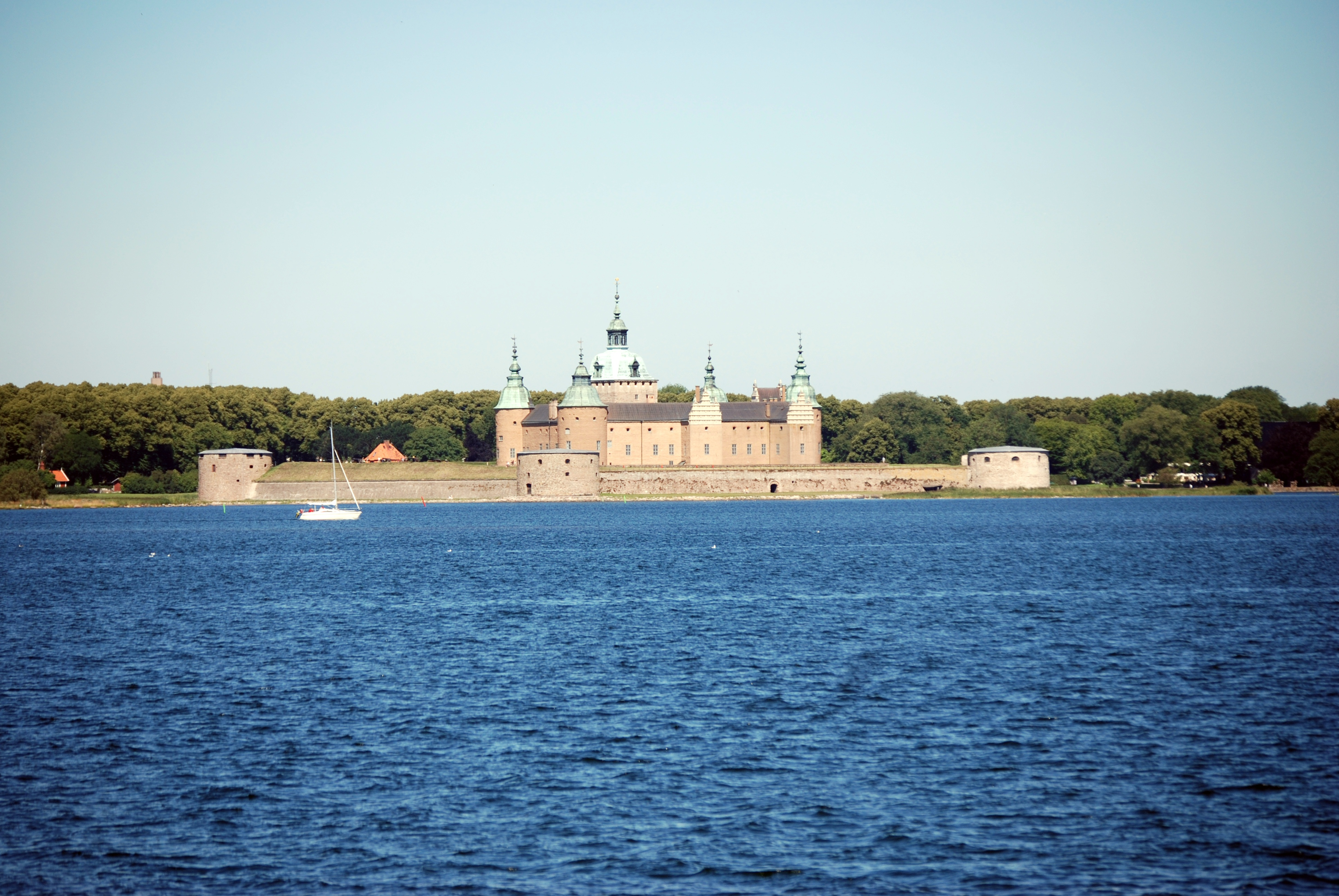
View from the sea

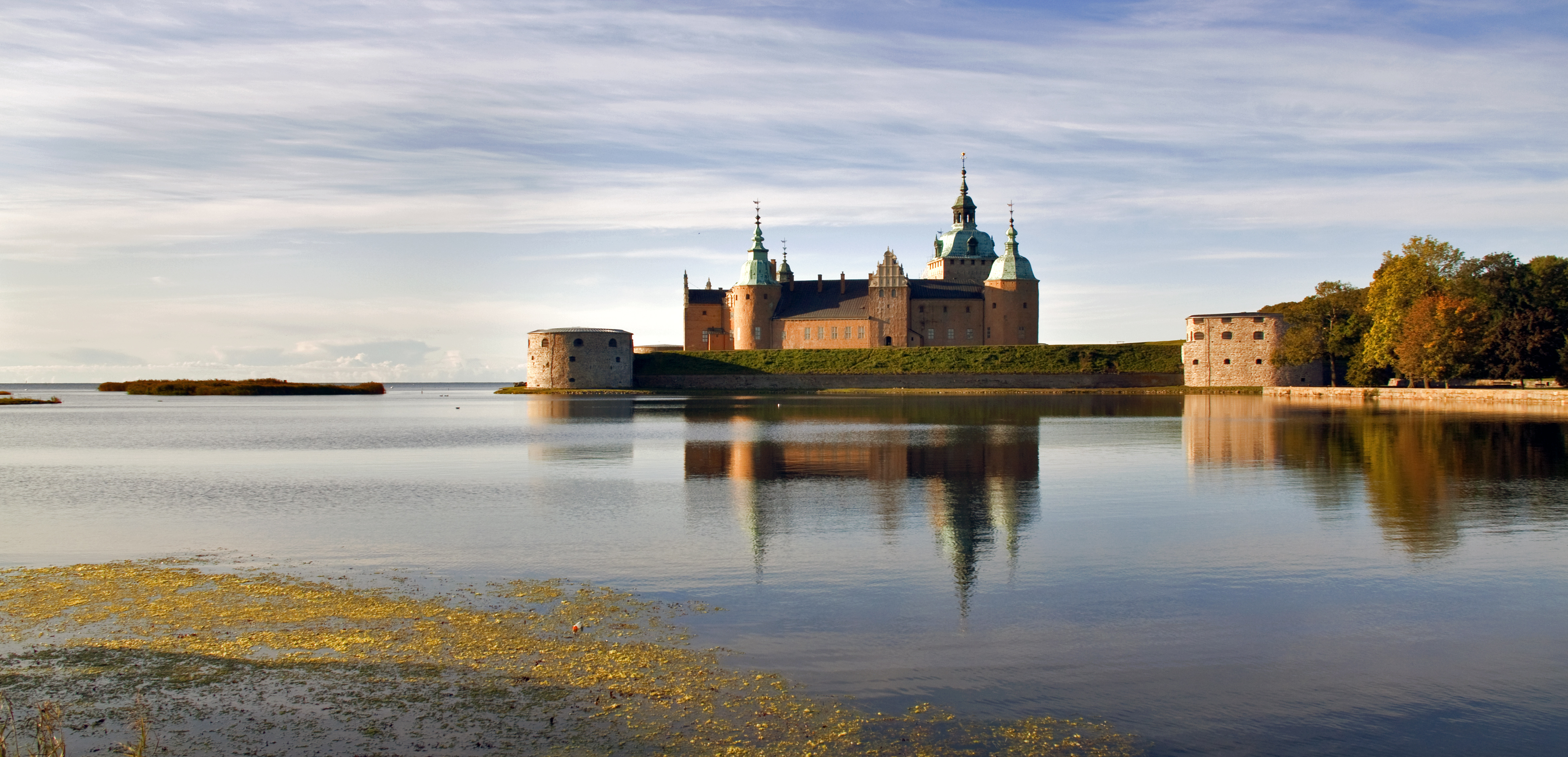
View from the northeastern side

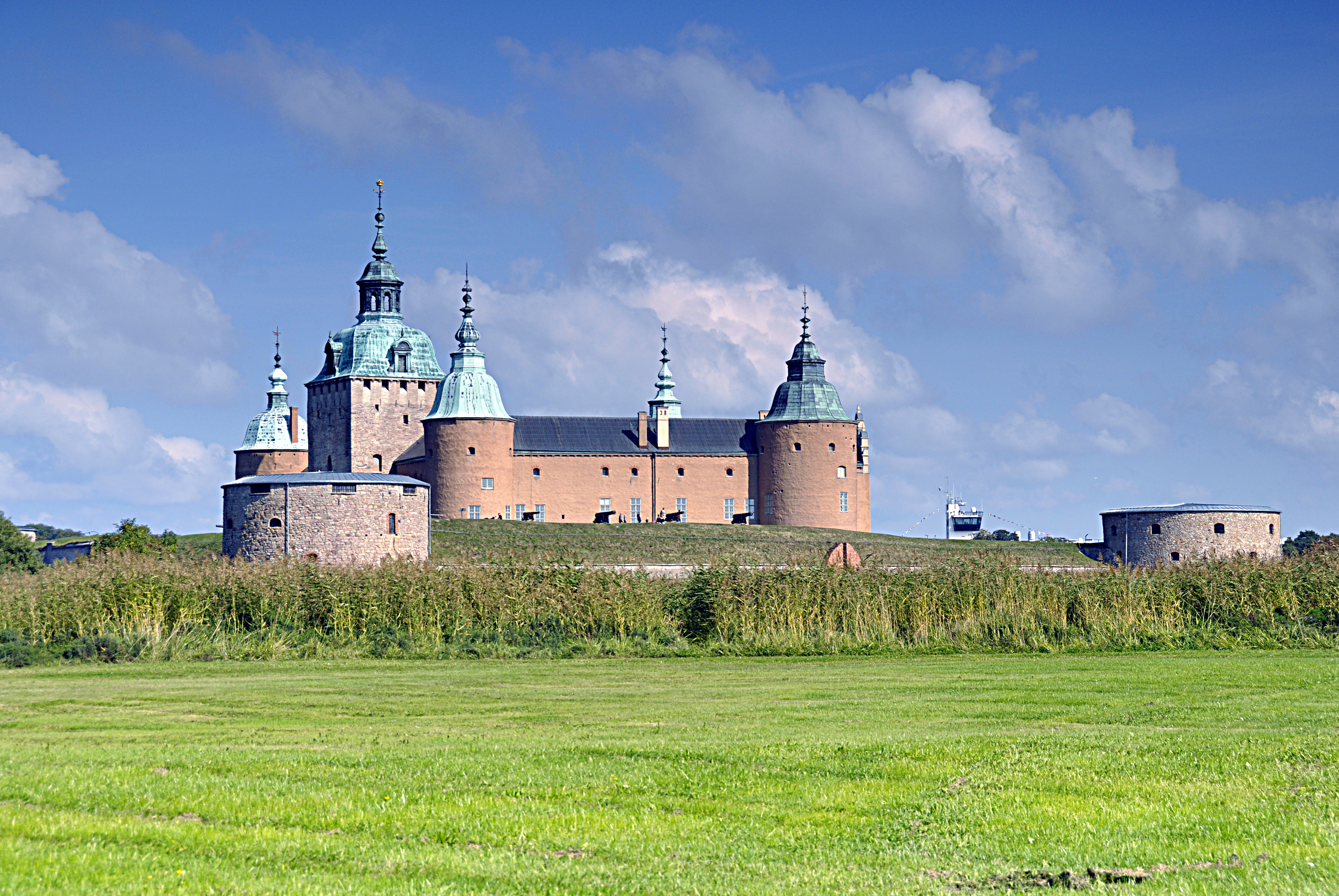
View from the south

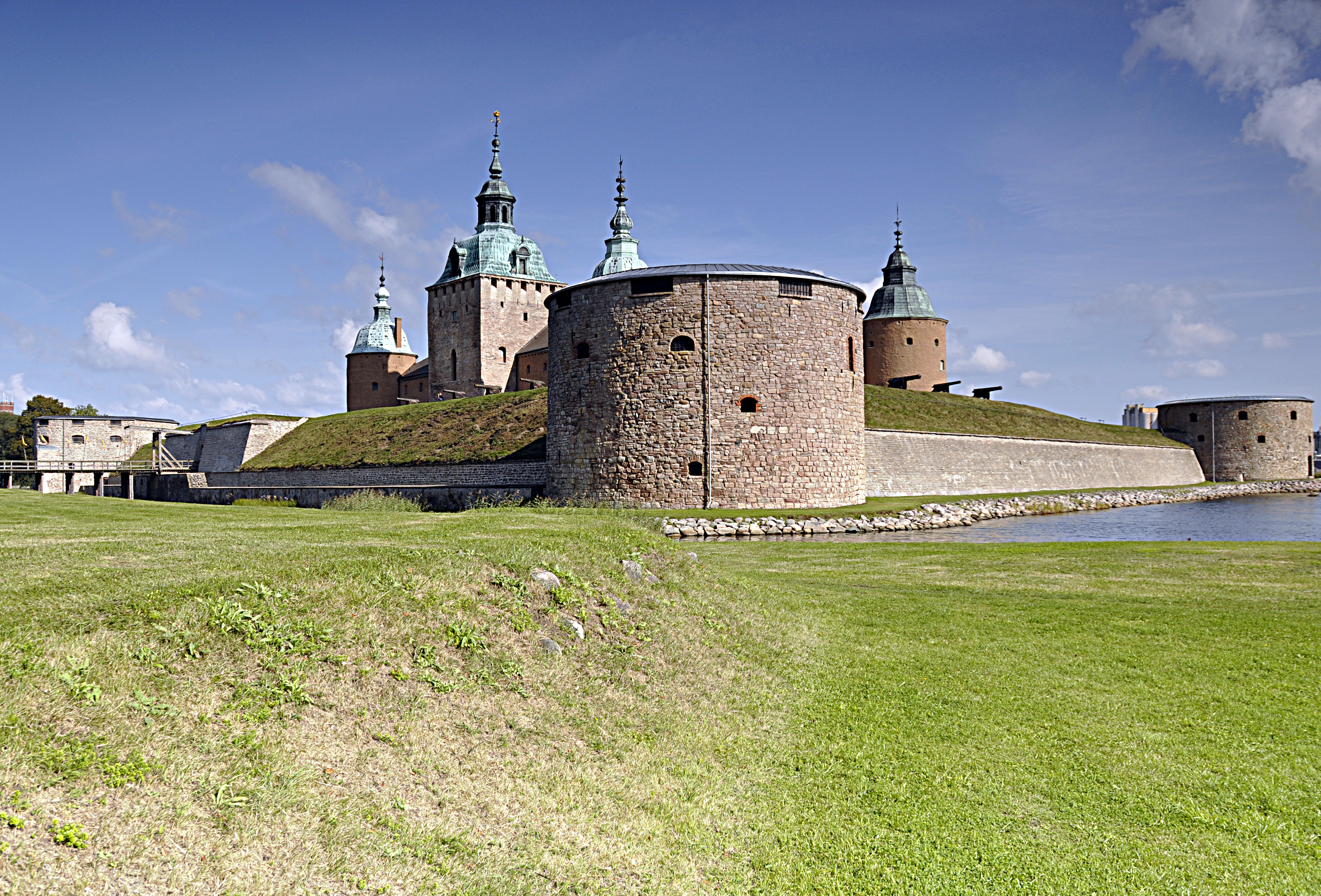
The castle viewed from the old city ramparts

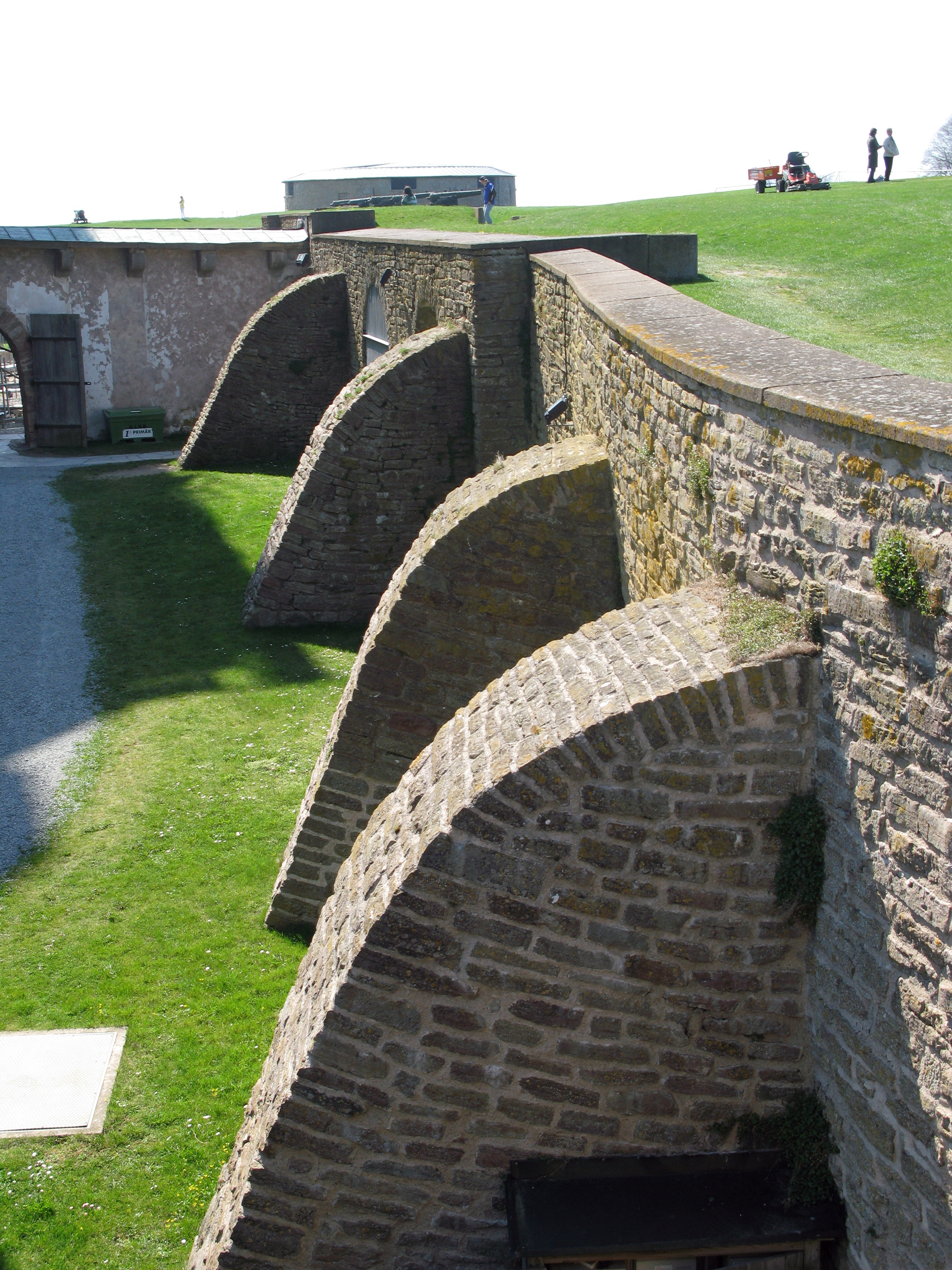
The castle's curtain wall

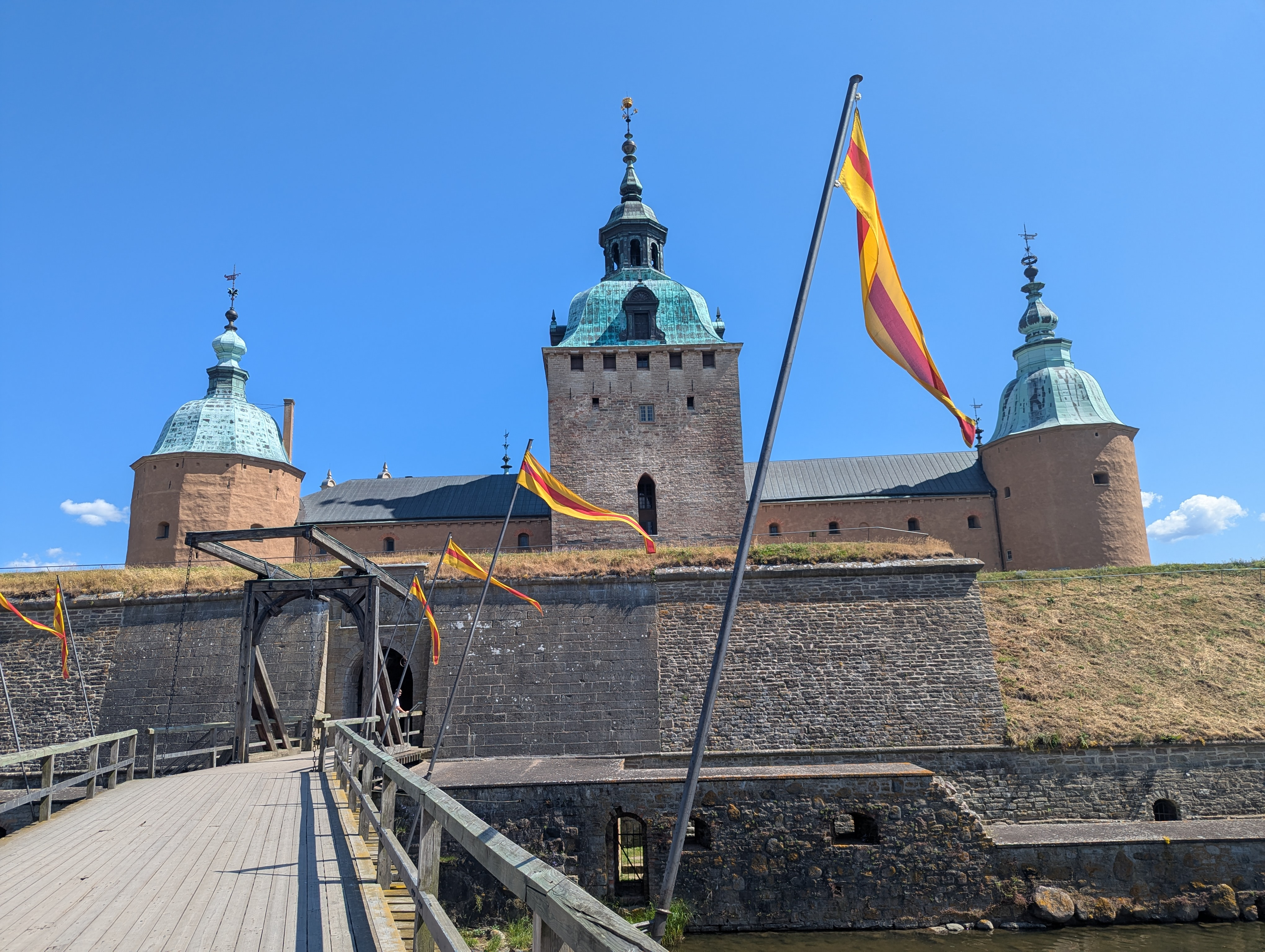
Main entrance

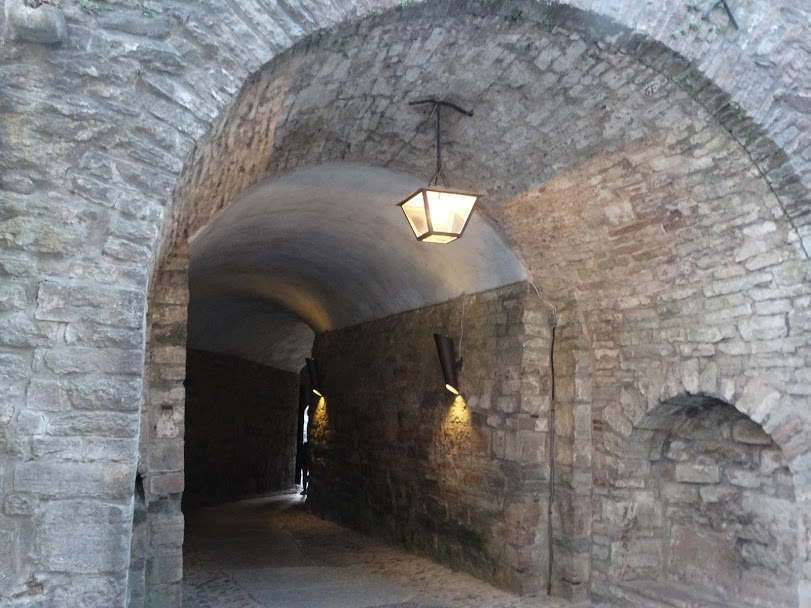
Indoor

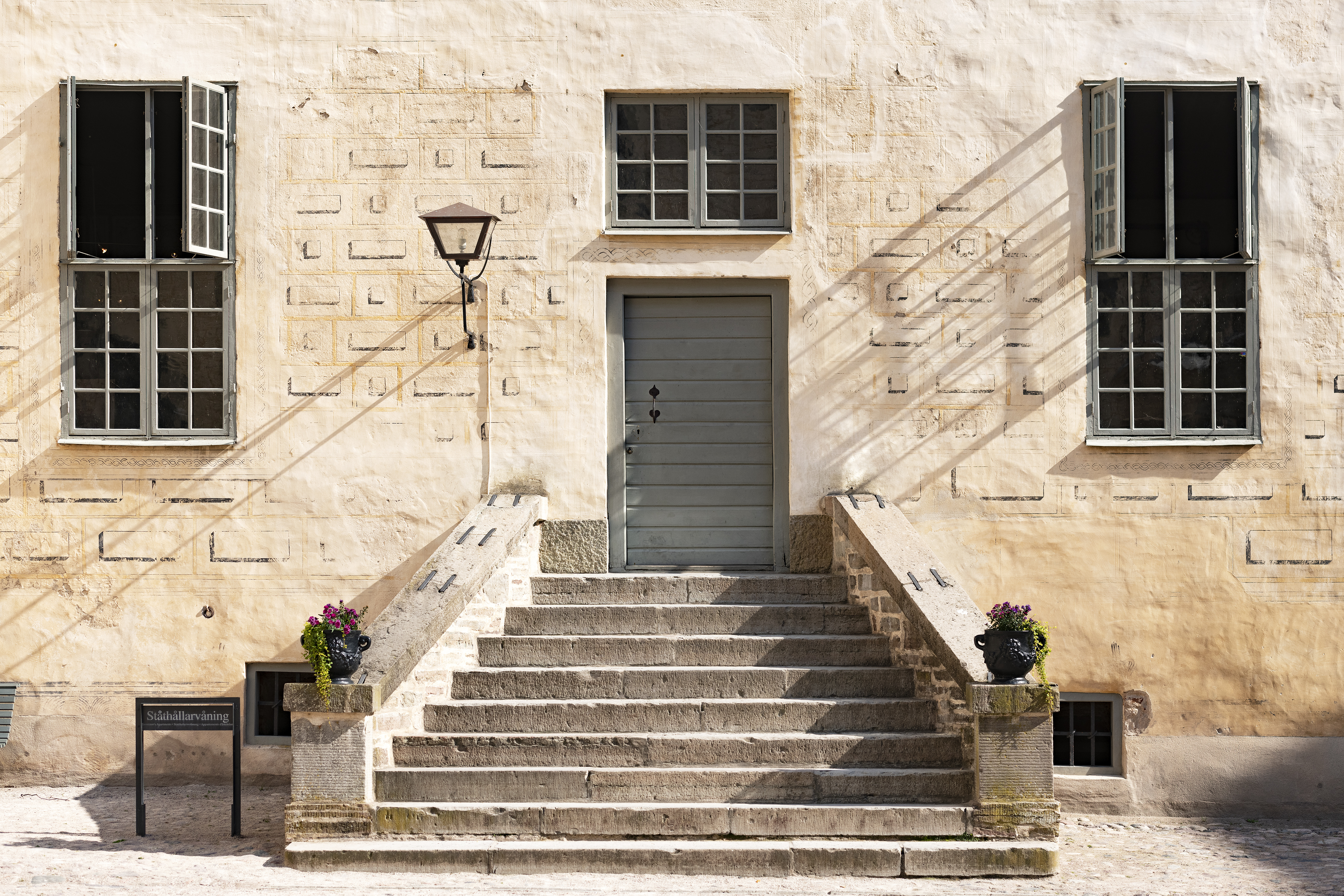
Courtyard facade and stairs

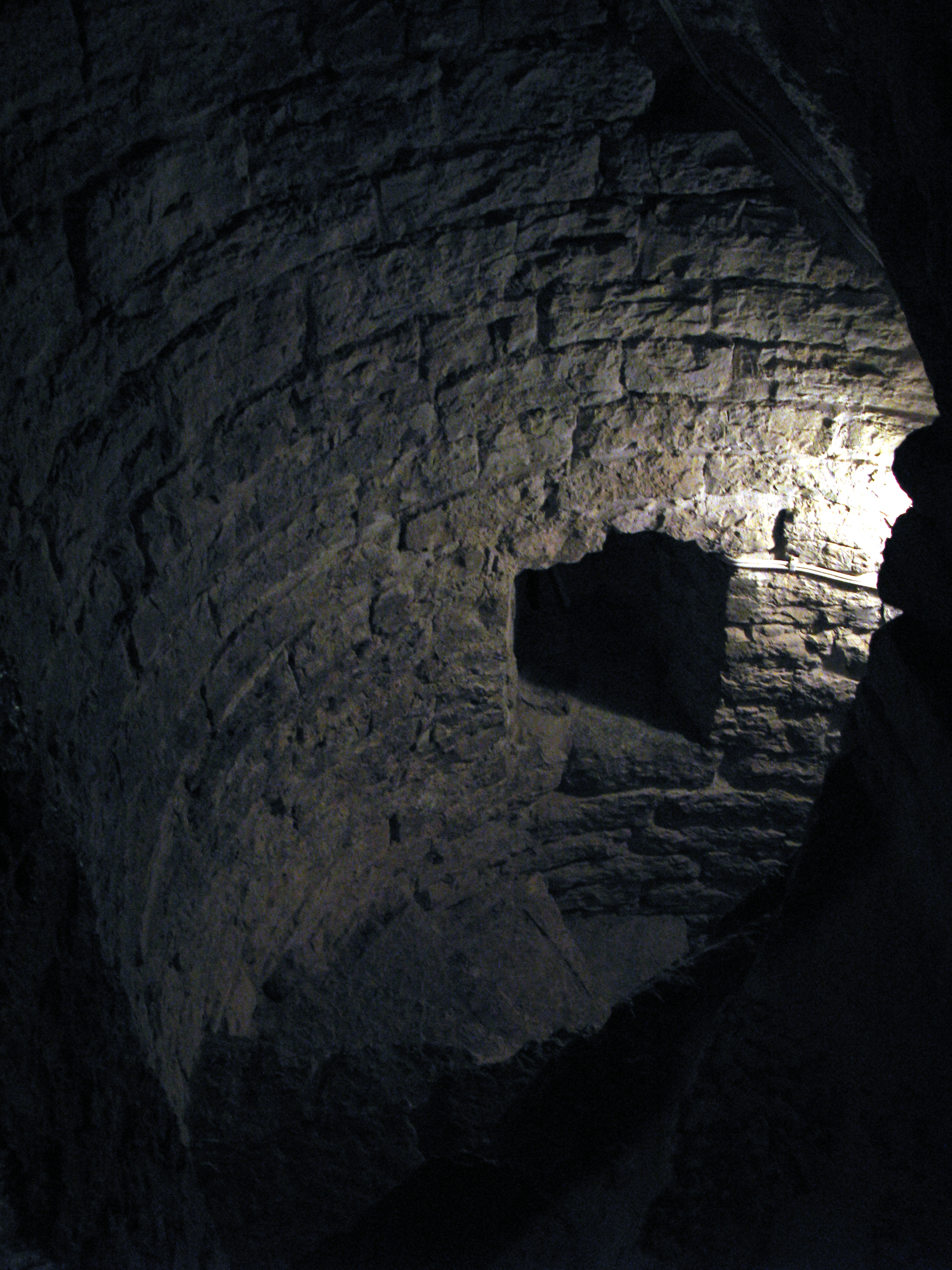
Stairway to the dungeons

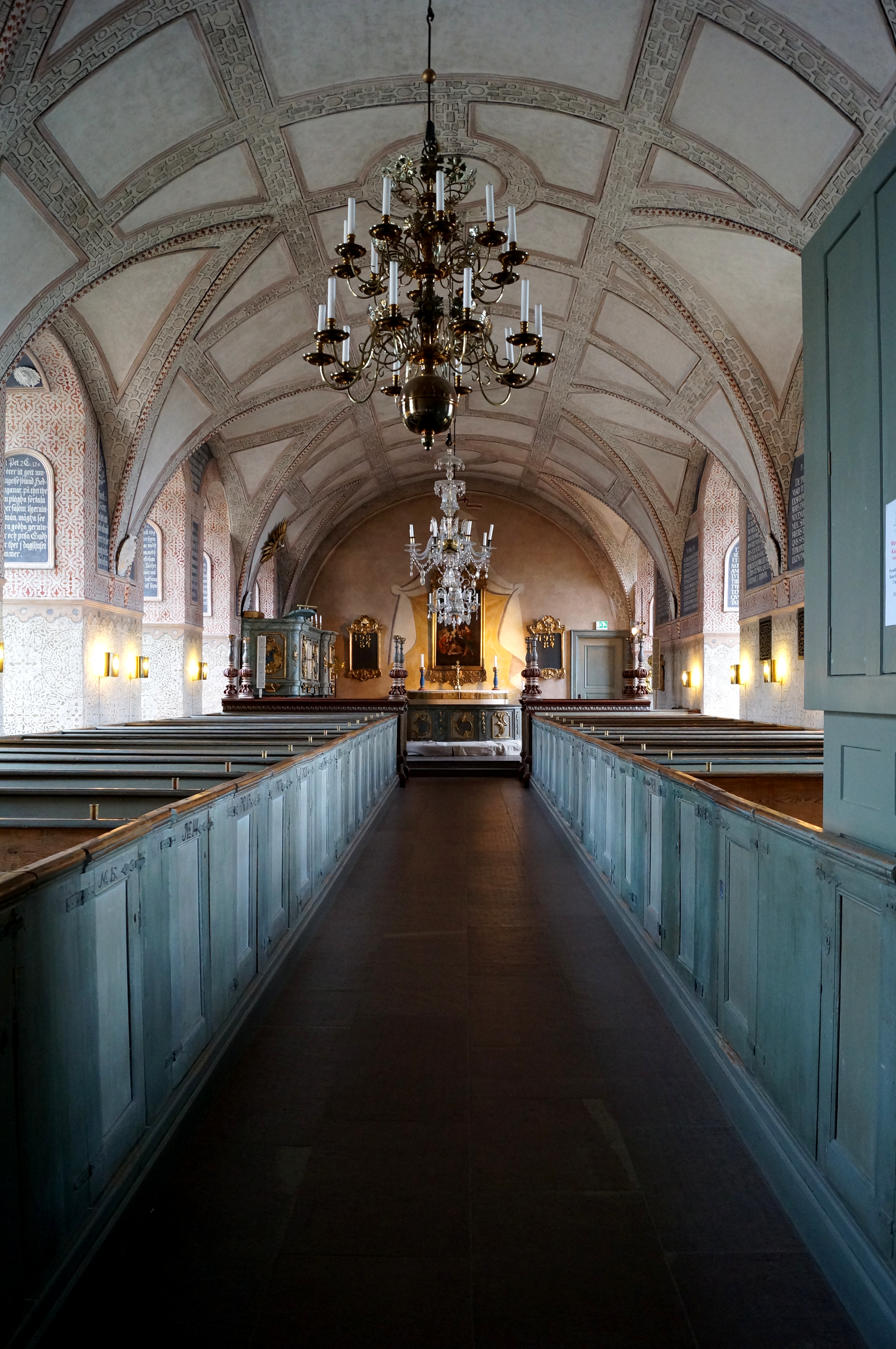
The castle chapel

== Other sources ==
- Kaufmann, J. E. & Kaufmann, H. W. The Medieval Fortress: Castles, Forts and Walled Cities of the Middle Ages (MA: Da Capo Press, 2004)
