= Kalmar Bloodbath (1505) =

1505 mass execution at Kalmar, Sweden

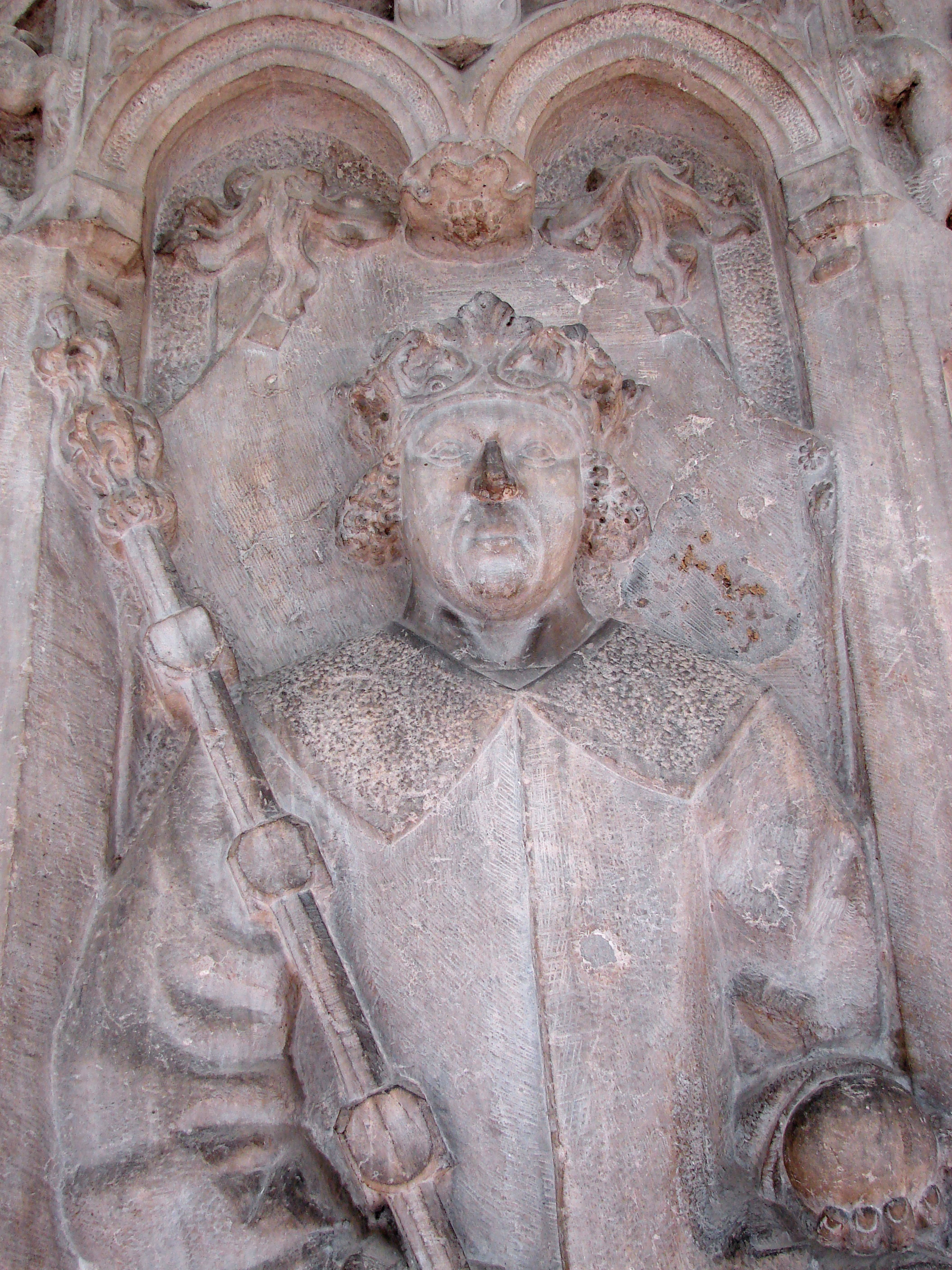
King Hans of Denmark, who ordered the mass execution at Kalmar.

The Kalmar Bloodbath (Swedish: Kalmar blodbad), sometimes described as the First Kalmar Bloodbath to distinguish it from a later massacre in the same location, was a politically motivated mass execution that was carried out in Kalmar, Sweden, on July 2, 1505, immediately after a conviction of treason and a sentence of death had been pronounced against participants in the Swedish Uprising against the Danish ruler, King Hans.

Historian Cornelius F. Wegener based the date on documents from Swedish and Danish archives. Another historian, Gustaf Volmer Sylvander, would note that "The king undertook this bloodbath immediately after the sentence was handed down."

The victims included the mayor of Kalmar, the city councillors and a number of the leading burghers of the city. The executions were ordered by King Hans of Denmark-Norway, ostensibly in retaliation for help rendered by the citizens of Kalmar to the Swedish regent Sten Sture the Elder in his 1503 siege of Kalmar Castle.

Hans had become King of Denmark-Norway in 1481, and was also acclaimed as King of Sweden in 1497, thereby briefly restoring the pan-Scandinavian Kalmar Union. However, in 1501 the Swedes rebelled against him under the leadership of Sten Sture. A Danish garrison continued to hold out for some time at Kalmar Castle, close to the Danish border (Blekinge then being part of Denmark), but it was eventually compelled to surrender in 1503.

Sten Sture died over the winter of 1503-4 and was succeeded as regent by his distant cousin Svante Nilsson. The two sides used the change of leadership as an opportunity to open negotiations, and in May 1504 a preliminary peace was agreed. As part of the deal it was arranged to hold a summit meeting between the Swedish, Danish and Norwegian riksråd (privy councils) at Kalmar in July 1505 to discuss possible conditions under which the Swedes might accept Hans as king again. However, the political situation in Sweden became unstable in spring 1505, and Svante Nilsson cancelled the meeting. Hans nevertheless travelled to Kalmar with his entourage, either because Svante's message failed to reach him in time or because he intended to send a message to the Swedes.

In Kalmar, Hans assembled a court and tried Svante Nilsson in absentia for the crime of lèse-majesté, along with several other Swedish nobles including Nils Klausson, Sten Kristersson, Trotte Månsson (Eka), Erik Turesson, Åke Hansson (Thott), Erik Johansson Vasa, Tönne Eriksson (Thott) and Peder Turesson (Bielke). They were all declared to be guilty, and Hans decreed them sentenced to confiscation and imprisonment. Obviously the sentences could not be enforced as none of the Swedes were actually present, and so instead Hans demonstrated his power by having the leading citizens of Kalmar arrested and executed for having supposedly helped Sten Sture's forces in the 1503 siege of Kalmar Castle.

== See also ==
- Kalmar Bloodbath (1599)
- Stockholm Bloodbath

== Other sources ==
- "Kalmar Blodbad". Nordisk familjebok. 13: 673–4.
- Petersson, E, Den skoningslöse, Natur & Kultur, 2008
