= Ida Wikoff Baker =

Ida Wikoff Baker (July 31, 1859 - April 21, 1907) was an American business executive, civic leader and philanthropist during the early 20th century whose legacy remains evident in 21st-century Decatur, Illinois. She and her sister, Laura B. Wikoff Pahmeyer (1855-1933), played key roles in the cultural and scientific growth of their community while also helping to advance women's rights during the late 1800s and early to mid-1900s through their development of financial support services for women.

== Early life ==
Ida Wikoff Baker was born in Decatur, Illinois, on July 31, 1859. Her father, Peter Montfort Wikoff (1826-1899), a butcher and farmer, was a native of Warren County, Ohio, who moved with his father to Illinois while quite young. He was a descendant of Peter Cloesen Wikoff, who came from Holland in 1636 and settled on Long Island, where he held a position under the Dutch Government. He married Margaret Van Ness. Baker's mother, whose maiden name was Elizabeth Fletcher (1824-1896), was born near Crotches' Ferry, Maryland.

== Career ==
In 1889 Baker's sister, Laura B. Wikoff Pahmeyer (1855-1933), organized a stock company composed of women only, for the purpose of promoting the industrial, educational and social advancement of women, and for literary, scientific and musical culture in the city of Decatur. Articles of incorporation were issued to the Woman's Club Stock Company on August 15, 1889, and a building was finished and occupied by the first tenant on November 1, 1890. Baker was named one of the nine directors at the first annual meeting, was elected secretary of the stock company on January 12, 1891.

In December 1889, the Woman's Exchange was established as a branch of the Industrial and Charitable Union. Baker was elected president and served until forced by illness to resign. After partly regaining her health, she served as treasurer and business manager.

She was a charter member of the Womans club and served as its president from 1898 to 1901. She was a chairman of the Civic division of the club and a few months prior her death appeared before he city council with a committee to ask for a police matron for the city of Decatur.

She was a member of the Order of the Eastern Star, and of the Woman's Christian Temperance Union.

== Personal life ==
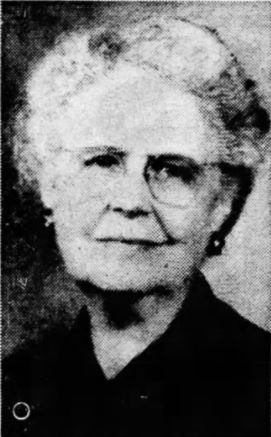
Alice Baker File

On April 25, 1878, Ida Wikoff Baker married Joseph Newton Baker (1844-1929), then a merchant of Decatur, and later connected with the Citizens' National Bank. They had three children, but only a daughter, Alice A. Baker, lived. A son, Monfort W. Baker, died in 1879.

She died on April 21, 1907, and is buried at Greenwood Cemetery, Decatur, Illinois.

== Legacy ==
Her house at 413 West Decatur Street, Decatur, Illinois, one of the oldest and best-preserved homes in Decatur, is now open to visitors. It was originally built by John and Elizabeth Rucker of Long Creek for their granddaughter, Arminda Rucker, who married attorney Edwin R. Eldridge in 1869. In 1882 it was sold to Peter M. Wikoff, who gave it to his daughter, who moved in 1883, and then passed to her daughter Alice, who married Forrest File in 1908, and lived there until the 1940s.
