= Sara Davy Armbruster =

American businesswoman and publisher

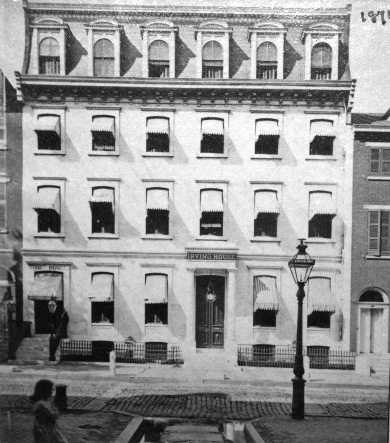
Irving House, late 1880s

Sara Davy Armbruster (née Guiner; September 29, 1862 – September 2, 1911) was an American businesswoman and publisher.

== Early life ==
Armbruster was born in 1862 in Philadelphia, Pennsylvania, to William Guiner, from Pennsylvania, and Sara Ann Davy, from England. Her early years were passed in luxury, and she had all the advantages of thorough schooling.

== Career ==
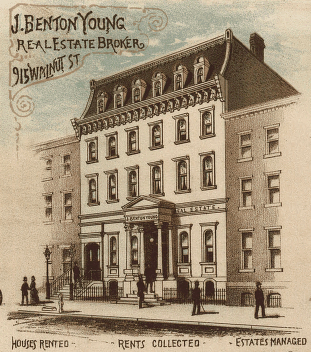
The J. Benton Young, Real Estate Broker, in 1885

When she was seventeen years old, reverses left her family poor and she was made partly helpless by paralysis. Obliged to support herself and other members of her family she took the Irving House, a hotel of ninety-five rooms, in Philadelphia, and by good management made it a successful establishment and lifted herself and those dependent upon her above poverty. The building, at 915 and 917 Walnut Street, was originally two venues, Franklin Savings Fund and the Cyrus Cadwallader, Treasurer for the Fund. When the Franklin Savings Fund failed in the 1880s, the building became The J. Benton Young, Real Estate Broker, in 1885. Soon after it was converted in the Irving House: a night's stay at the hotel was between US$2 to US$2.50 in 1898 (US$2 in 1898, US$56.34 in 2017). In 1942, Irving House was replaced by the Hotel Senator. The building was later demolished.

She was a business woman, and a successful one from the day on which she was thrown upon her own resources. She founded in Philadelphia the Woman's Exchange.

Another of her enterprises was to furnish a house for the infants of widows and deserted wives in her native city.

She was the publisher of the Woman's Journal, a weekly paper devoted to the cause of women.

== Personal life ==
She married Jacob Henry Ambruster at an early age and divorced in 1893. Of her three children, only one lived.

She is buried at West Laurel Hill Cemetery, Bala Cynwyd, Pennsylvania.
