= Kalmar Bloodbath (1599) =

1599 mass execution at Kalmar, Sweden

Coordinates: 56.658°N 16.355°E

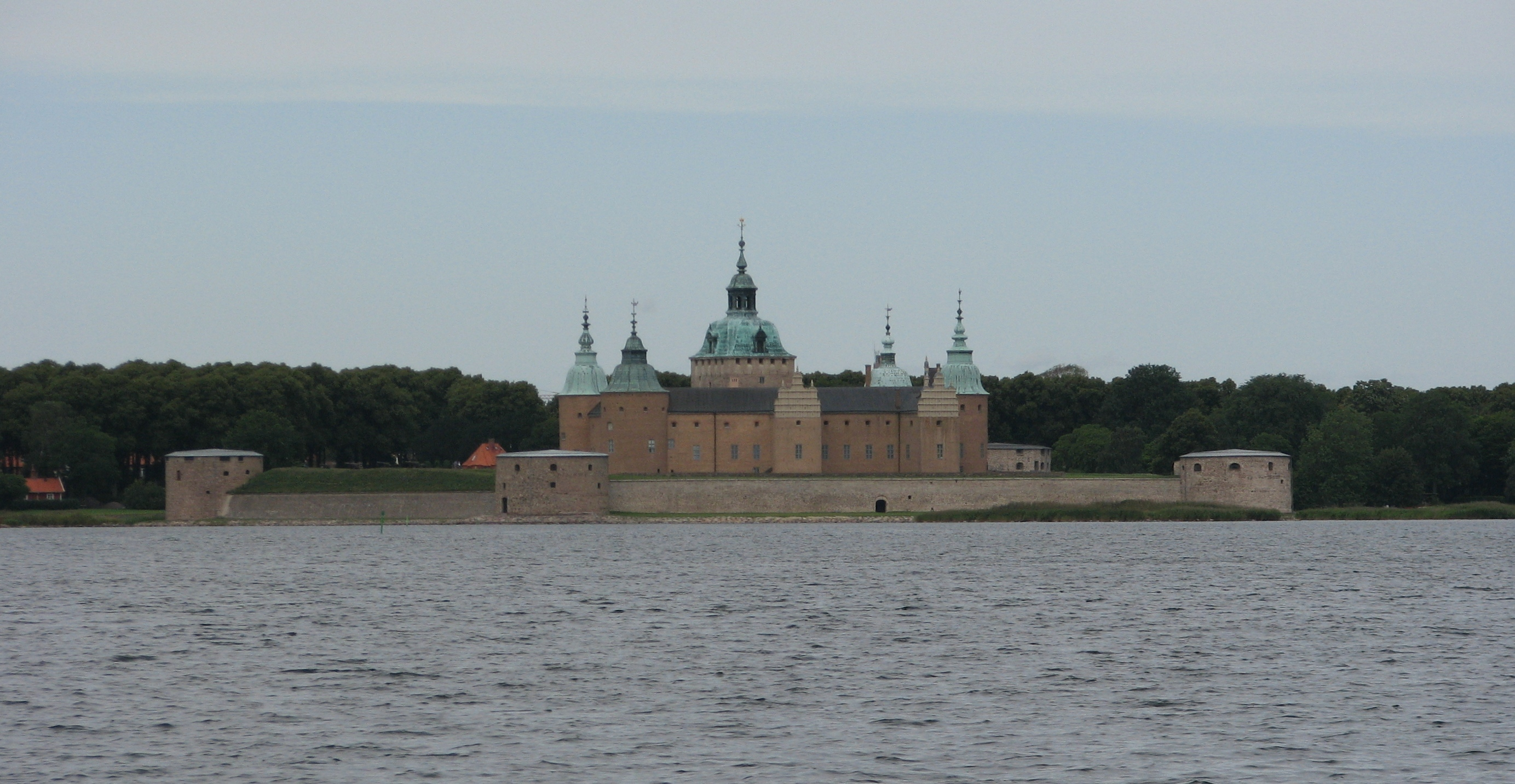
Kalmar Castle. The victims of the Kalmar Bloodbath were all members of the castle garrison.

The Kalmar Bloodbath (Swedish: Kalmar blodbad), sometimes described as the Second Kalmar Bloodbath to distinguish it from an earlier massacre in the same place, was the public mass execution of 22 men in Kalmar, Sweden, on 16 May 1599. All of the victims were members of the garrison from Kalmar Castle, and included three noblemen (Johan Larsson Sparre, Kristofer Andersson Grip and Lars Andersson Rålamb) and a priest (the garrison chaplain Birger), all four of whom were beheaded. The other eighteen victims, comprising secretaries, garrison officers and mercenary commanders, were all hanged.

The executions took place during the War against Sigismund, in which Duke Charles of Södermanland rebelled against his nephew Sigismund III Vasa, who was king both of Sweden and of the Polish-Lithuanian Commonwealth. Charles decisively defeated Sigismund at the Battle of Stångebro (September 1598), near Linköping, and Sigismund subsequently escaped to Poland.

A garrison loyal to Sigismund continued to hold the strategically-located Kalmar Castle, commanded by Johan Larsson Sparre, Kristofer Andersson Grip and Lars Andersson Rålamb. Charles therefore sent an army to lay siege to the fortress in March. The city of Kalmar was captured in April, and the castle itself surrendered on 12 May. Four days later, 22 senior members of the garrison, including the commanders Sparre, Grip and Rålamb, were executed without trial. The heads of the three noblemen were subsequently displayed on pikes above the city's western gate.

The war ended in complete victory for Duke Charles. Sigismund was formally deposed in July 1599, and his uncle succeeded him, as King Charles IX.

== See also ==
- Kalmar Bloodbath (1505)
- Linköping Bloodbath

== Other sources ==
- "Kalmar Blodbad". Nordisk familjebok. 13: 673–4.
- Hans Gillingstam. "Sparre, släkt". Svenskt biografiskt lexikon.
