= Nugent Slaughter =

American special effects designer

- Born: March 17, 1888; Virginia, U.S.
- Died: December 27, 1968 (aged 80); Oroville, California, U.S.
- Occupation: Special effects designer
- Years active: 1927

Nugent Slaughter (March 17, 1888 – December 27, 1968) was an American special effects designer. He provided the special effects and sound mixing for the 1927 film The Jazz Singer. His efforts in this project earned him a nomination for the Academy Award for Engineering Effects.
