= Linton Wells II =

American public servant (born 1946)

Linton (Lin) Wells II
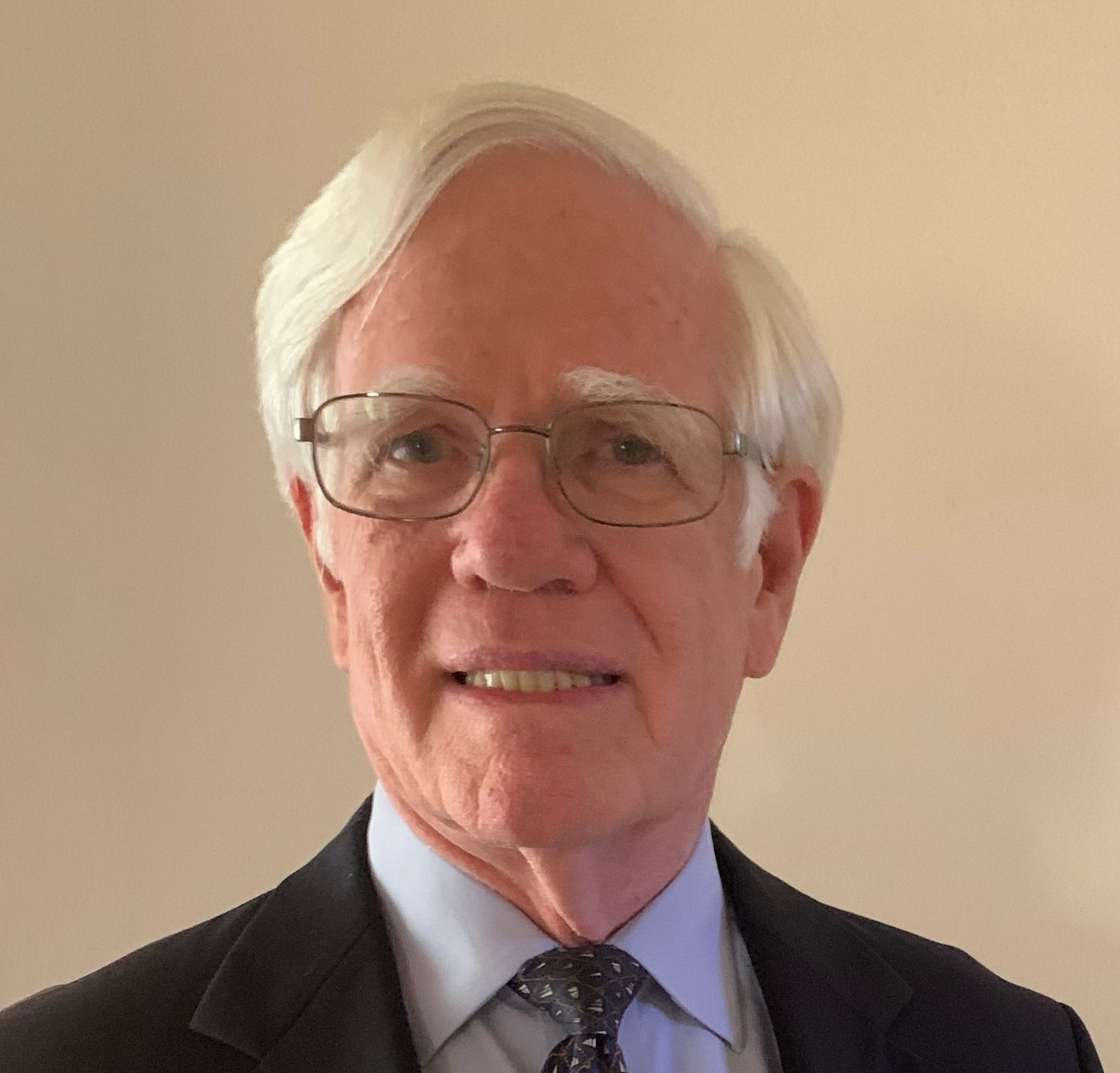
- Wells in 2020
- Born: Luanda, Angola
- Status: Active
- Education: U.S. Naval Academy, Johns Hopkins University
- Occupations: US Naval Officer, Senior Advisor to the Secretary of Defense, Educator
- Spouse: Linda
- Children: Linton Wells III, Frank M. Wells
- Parent(s): Linton Wells, Fay Gillis Wells

Acting Assistant Secretary of Defense (Networks and Information Integration)/Chief Information Officer
- In office 6 March 2004 – 14 November 2005
- President: George W. Bush
- Preceded by: John P. Stenbit
- Succeeded by: John Grimes

Linton Wells II (born 1946) is an American public servant and educator who served a total of 51 years in government service. He served 26 years in the United States Navy as an officer, and then was appointed by the president of the United States as the Principal Deputy Assistant Secretary of Defense, serving through two administrations of both parties, both the Democrat Bill Clinton and the Republican George W. Bush. He wrote many books, articles, and white papers on matters of national security, including important texts related to the use of American military capabilities in global humanitarian operations. His expertise focused on the strategic impacts of technological change and on building resilience to natural and man-made disasters as issues of US national security. He shaped, over five decades of public service, current US Department of Defense directives that link policy and technology with public-private cooperation. His writings significantly altered U.S. and international approaches to civil-military engagement, US policy in global humanitarian assistance, and global public-private partnerships in disaster relief. He has also made fundamental contributions to technical areas that have defined network-enabled military capabilities and cyberspace operations. After retiring from public service, he continued to contribute to the international STAR-TIDES network that he had founded in 2007, a consortium of several thousand global nodes comprising agencies, organizations, institutions and individuals in 40+ countries that promote the free exchange of research results on global issues of human security. As of 2024 he is Executive Advisor to the Center for Resilient and Sustainable Communities (C-RASC) at George Mason University and chairs the Advisory Group of the C4I and Cyber Center there. C-RASC has been working with the People-Centered Internet (PCI) on ways to “put humanity at the center of the Internet” and support a variety of revitalization initiatives. He is on the board of PCI, and also the president and CEO of Global Resilience Strategies and Senior Advisor to Resilient Japan. He was listed by Fortune magazine in 2009 as one of the top 16 "Players of Tech".

== Career ==
Wells spent over 50 years in the U.S. Department of Defense (DoD), including 26 years uniformed service in the Navy where he retired as a Captain (O-6). While on active duty he served as Commanding Officer of the USS Joseph Strauss, DDG-16 and Commander of Destroyer Squadron 21. He subsequently served 14 years within the Senior Executive Service in the Office of the Secretary of Defense (OSD). During his years in The Pentagon he was appointed by President Bush to be Acting Assistant Secretary of Defense (Networks and Information Integration) and DoD Chief Information Officer (CIO). After completing several appointments within the Pentagon, in 2007 he accepted an offer to become the Force Transformation Chair at National Defense University. He was additionally selected in 2010 to direct the NDU Center for Technology and National Security Policy and, later, to be Interim Director of the Institute for National Strategic Studies (INSS).

His post-government work focused on the impact of rapidly changing technologies on U.S. national security policy, emphasizing the strategic importance of the accelerating and converging developments in Biotechnology, Robotics, Information technology, Nanotechnology and Energy ("BRINE"), a term coined by his colleague Frank Hoffman. He now is a Visiting Distinguished Research Fellow at INSS at NDU, and Executive Advisor to the C4I and Cyber Center in the Volgenau School of Engineering and to transdisciplinary Center for Resilient and Sustainable Communities (C-RASC), both at the George Mason University (GMU). He is widely published on the national security implications of workforce issues, including:

- the replacement of labor by automation and artificial intelligence,
- defining how innovative learning can contribute to leader development,
- educational transformation, and
- improved decision-making for complex (“Wicked”) problems.

He serves on several national and international advisory boards, and is the Managing Partner of Wells Analytics, LLC, and President of Global Resilience Strategies.

== Biography ==
=== Early life and education ===
Wells was born in Luanda, Angola, the son of American foreign correspondent Linton Wells and pioneer aviator Fay Gillis Wells. His education included:

- 1951-1954 - Brunswick School, Greenwich, CT (grades 1–4)
- 1954-1958 - Pine Crest School, Fort Lauderdale, FL (grades 5–8)
- 1958-1963 - Browning School, New York City (grades 9–12)
- 1963-1967 - U.S. Naval Academy, Bachelor of Science degree in Physics and Oceanography. Trident Scholar and recipient of the Charles N.G. Hendrix award for excellence in oceanography.
- 1971-1975 - Johns Hopkins University from 1971 to 1975 on an Arleigh Burke scholarship, receiving a Master of Science in engineering in Mathematical Sciences in 1974, and a PhD in political science (International Relations) in 1975.
- 1983 - National Institute for Defense Studies (防衛研究所) in Tokyo, Japan.
- 1994 - Harvard Kennedy School of Government, as a Diplomate of the Senior Officers in National Security Program.

=== Navy career ===
In twenty-six years of commissioned service he served in a variety of ships as a Surface Warfare Officer. A full roster of his shipboard service includes:

- 1967-1969 - USS Marathon, Weapons and Supply Officer
- 1969-1970 - USS Josephus Daniels, Navigator
- 1976-1977 - USS Richard E. Byrd, Operations Officer
- 1980-1981 - USS Lockwood, Executive Officer
- 1984-1986 - USS Joseph Strauss, Commanding Officer
- 1989-1991 - Destroyer Squadron 21, Commander

Ashore he served in the Pentagon and on the staff of the Chief of Naval Operations (OP 090R). During his career he acquired experience in operations analysis with particular expertise in the Pacific, Indian Ocean and Middle Eastern affairs through the lens of Command, Control, Communications and Intelligence (C3I)

=== Civilian service in the Office of the Secretary of Defense ===
Wells served in the Office of the Secretary of Defense from 1977 to 1980 and from 1991 to 2007, with his final position being that of Principal Deputy Assistant Secretary of Defense (Networks and Information Integration). He served as the Acting Assistant Secretary and DoD Chief Information Officer on two occasions, in 2001 and again in 2004–5. He was a White House political appointee in both the Bill Clinton and George W. Bush administrations.

His other OSD positions included Principal Deputy Assistant Secretary of Defense (C3I) and Deputy Under Secretary of Defense (Policy Support) in the Office of the Under Secretary of Defense (Policy). He is the author of a well-known 2001 memo on the “unpredictable nature of great power relations” that has been cited by former Secretary of Defense Donald Rumsfeld.

Throughout his time in government, Wells became known for his transformational contributions in four broad areas:

- Network-Enabled Defense, Diplomacy and Development: Providing policy, oversight and guidance for the introduction of network-enabled capabilities across the Department of Defense.
- Emergency Preparedness: Aggressively promoting improvements in emergency preparedness and disaster relief, building capacity ahead of crises to mitigate damage, and engaging with non-traditional partners. He also holds several inter-governmental advisory roles defining civil-military cooperation and promoting cross-disciplinary approaches, including reducing the vulnerability of humanitarian activities and Smart Cities to offensive cyberspace operations.
- Technology-Policy Integration: Promoting research into the emerging and intersecting policy challenges of cyberspace operations, space, and robotics
- East Asian and Middle Eastern security issues: Significant policy analyses related to the defense of Japan and the Persian Gulf region, at the request of the US Department of Defense.

== Civilian awards ==
- 2014 - Chairman of the Joint Chiefs of Staff Medal for Distinguished Public Service
- 2012 - Inducted into the Wall of Excellence for US Naval Academy Oceanography
- 2008 - Woodrow Wilson Award for Distinguished Government Service from Johns Hopkins University
- 2000, 2001, 2007 - Department of Defense Medal for Distinguished Public Service (DoD's highest award to a private citizen) Third Award added a Silver Palm.
- 1995 - Browning School Alumnus Achievement Award
- 1987 - The Explorers Club, elected a National Fellow
- 1976 - International Forest of Friendship Honoree
- 1975 - Tau Beta Pi (Maryland Alpha chapter)—engineering honorary.
- 1966 - Sigma Pi Sigma

== Military awards ==
- 1991 - Legion of Merit Second Award
- 1980 - Defense Superior Service Medal
- 1989 - Legion of Merit First Award
- 1982 - Meritorious Service Medal
- 1977 - Navy Achievement Medal
- 1970 - Navy Commendation Medal
- 1970 - National Defense Service Medal
- 1986 - Battle "E" Ribbon
- 1968 - Vietnam Service Medal
- 1970 - Republic of Vietnam Campaign Medal
- 1991 - Southwest Asia Service Medal

== Personal life ==
Wells married Linda Marie Motta in New Bedford, MA in 1976. They have two children: Linton Wells III and Frank Motta Wells.

== Publications ==
Wells has written widely on security studies in English and Japanese journals. He has also co-edited a series of books on international transformation and leader development.

=== Books ===
- Doughty, Ralph, Linton Wells II, and Theodore Hailes, eds. 2015. Innovative Learning: A Key to National Security, Fort Leavenworth: The Army Press. ISBN 9781940804231.
- Wells, Linton II, Theodore C. Hailes, and Michael C. Davies. 2013. Changing Mindsets to Transform Security: Leader Development for an Unpredictable and Complex World, Washington: National Defense University, Center for Technology and National Security Policy.
- Kugler, Richard L. and Linton Wells II. 2013. Strategic Shift: Appraising Recent Shifts in U.S. Defense Plans and Priorities, Washington: National Defense University, Center for Technology and National Security Policy.
- Neal, Derrick and Linton Wells II, eds. 2010. Capability Development in Support of Comprehensive Approaches Washington: National Defense University, Center for Technology and National Security Policy.
- Neal, Derrick, Henrik Friman, Ralph Doughty, and Linton Wells II, eds. 2009. Crosscutting Issues in International Transformation: Interactions and Innovations among People, Organizations, Processes, and Technology Washington: National Defense University, Center for Technology and National Security Policy.
- Lacriox, Eric and Linton Wells II. 1997. Japanese Cruisers of the Pacific War. Annapolis: Naval Institute Press. ISBN 9780870213113.

He has published more than 30 monographs, book chapters and articles, many of which are available from the National Defense University website.
