= Linton Wells =

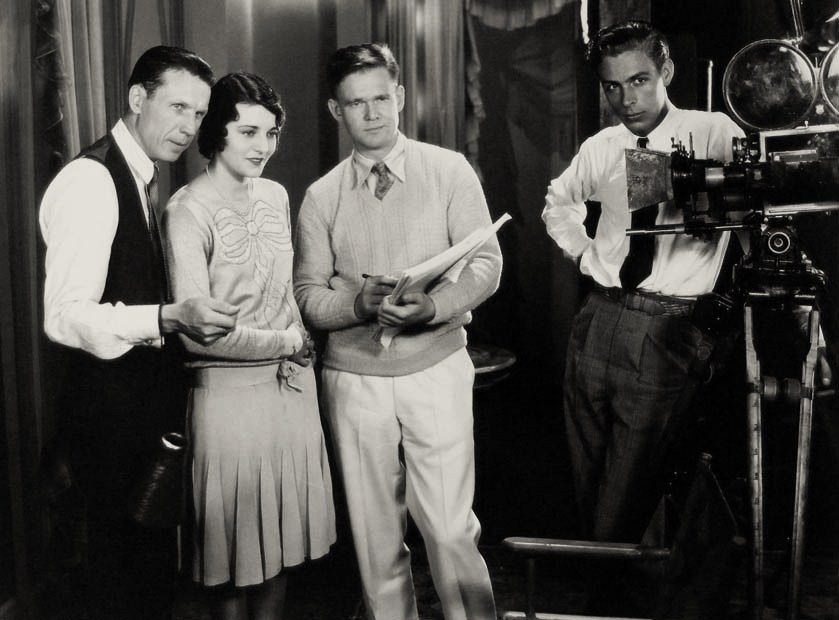
- L.t.r. Frank R. Strayer, Ruth Elder, Linton Wells and Edward Cronjager on the set of Moran of the Marines (1928)
- Born: April 1, 1893; Louisville, Kentucky, USA
- Died: January 14, 1976; Washington, D.C., USA
- Occupation(s): News reporter and correspondent
- Spouse: Fay Gillis Wells
- Relatives: Linton Wells II

Linton Wells (1893–1976) was an American foreign correspondent, world traveler and pioneer broadcaster.

== Early life and education ==
Born in Louisville, Kentucky, on April 1, 1893, he attended the US Naval Academy with the Class of 1914, but left before graduation. He began his career as a foreign correspondent with the China Press in Shanghai in 1912, covering Sun Yat Sen and the Xinhai Revolution. Returning from China early in World War I via Europe, he covered a revolution in Mexico, learned to fly in 1915, and helped build the first dam in Samoa.

== Career ==
After service in the Navy during World War I, he covered the Russian revolution, being imprisoned briefly by the Bolsheviks near Irkutsk. Following reporting from East Asia, he returned to the States in 1921 to cover Hollywood and events along the West Coast, returning to Japan in 1923, just in time to be injured in the Great Kantō earthquake of September 1, 1923.

In 1924, while working for the Associated Press, he accompanied the US Army aircraft Boston during the Calcutta to Karachi leg of the first round-the-world flight with the permission of the flight commander. The following year he and Leigh Wade, who had been the pilot of the Boston during the First World Flight, made the first non-stop automobile trip between Los Angeles and New York (167 hours and 50 minutes).

In 1926 he and Edward Steptoe Evans set a record for the fastest circumnavigation of the globe (28 days, 14 hours, 36 min). The following year he participated in fighting in Nicaragua, and returned to newspaper work in 1929 reporting from Europe for the International News Service.

From 1932 to early 1934 he reported from Moscow, where he met his future wife, the aviator Fay Gillis. After covering the coronation of the Puppet Emperor Puyi in Manchukuo, he returned to the US.

He married Fay Gillis on April 1, 1935, and, a few months later, they spent their honeymoon covering the Italian invasion of Abyssinia (Ethiopia) for the Herald Tribune. He published an autobiography, Blood on the Moon, in 1937.

After returning to the States to cover Hollywood for the Herald Tribune, he and his wife pioneered overseas radio broadcasts from Latin America in 1938 for The Magic Key of RCA. They both were founding members of the Overseas Press Club.

In 1939, at the suggestion of President Roosevelt, and in support of a secret British request, he and Fay investigated potential locations in Africa for a Jewish homeland. On December 7, 1941, after the Japanese attack on Pearl Harbor, he was part of one of the first television news broadcasts. From 1942 to 1946 he and Fay headed the US Commercial Company in West Africa, buying strategic materials for the war effort.

Returning to the States after the birth of their son Linton Wells II in Luanda, Angola in 1946, he owned a radio station in New York, lived for a time on a houseboat in Florida, returned to New York, and worked for the American Export Lines.

In 1962 he came to Washington in 1963 to open the Washington News Bureau for the Storer Broadcasting Company (then the largest privately owned radio and television network in the US), serving as the Washington Bureau Chief until 1972.

== Publications ==
In addition to his autobiography, he wrote Around the World in Twenty-Eight Days, Jumping Meridians, Salute to Valor and a play, Suzanna. The 1923 silent film Suzanna was based on Wells's play.

== Death ==
Linton Wells died in Washington, DC in January 1976. He was survived by his wife and son, two daughters, Barbara Church and Pat Ramacciotti, from his first marriage, and two granddaughters.
