= Fay Gillis Wells =

American aviator

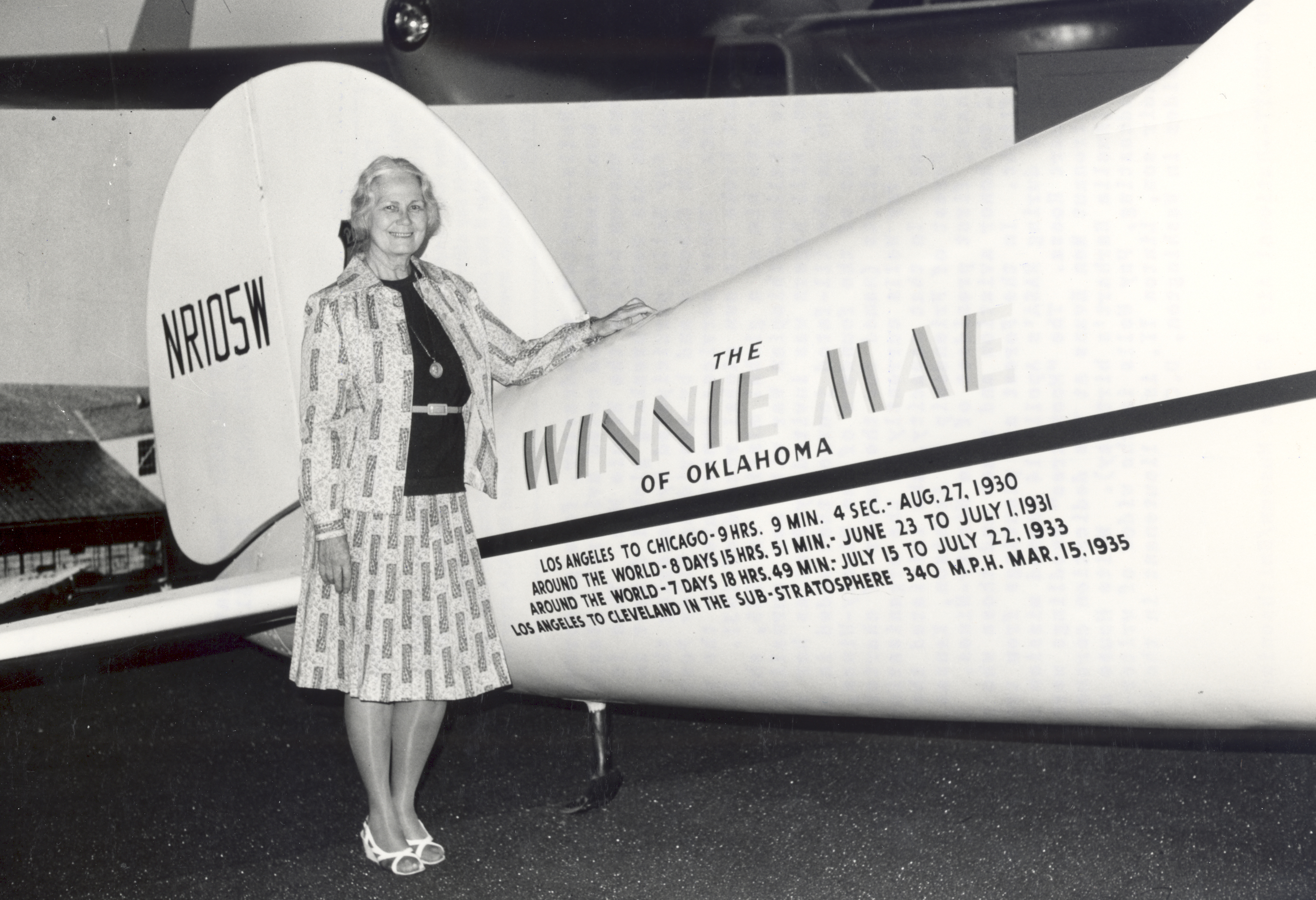
Fay Wells with the Winnie Mae in 1976

Fay Gillis Wells (October 15, 1908 – December 2, 2002) was an American pioneer aviator, globe-trotting journalist and a broadcaster.

In 1929, she became one of the first women pilots to bail out of an airplane to save her life and helped found the Ninety-Nines, the international organization of licensed women pilots. As a journalist she corresponded from the Soviet Union in the 1930s, covered wars and pioneered overseas radio broadcasting with her husband, the reporter Linton Wells, and was a White House correspondent from 1963 to 1977.

During the 1930s and 40s she and her husband carried out sensitive government missions, including being "sent by President Franklin D. Roosevelt on a top secret mission to Africa to look for possible postwar homelands for Jews", according to her obituary in The New York Times. For many years she actively promoted world friendship through flying.

== Early life and education ==
Born in Minneapolis, Minnesota, on October 15, 1908, as Helen Fay Gillis, Fay Gillis Wells grew up in various towns in the US and Canada as her father, Julius H. Gillis, relocated throughout his career as a mining engineer. She graduated from Battin High School in Elizabeth, New Jersey, in 1925, and studied at Michigan State University, but left before graduation to pursue other interests.

== Early career ==
=== Flying and journalism ===
In August 1929 she began flying. On September 1, 1929, she became one of the first women pilots to become a member of the Caterpillar Club, bailing out of an airplane to save her life when her plane disintegrated during aerobatics over Long Island. She soon became the first air saleswoman and demonstrator hired by the Curtiss Flying Service. Later that year she helped found the "Ninety Nines," and served as its first secretary, with Amelia Earhart as the first president. At the time of her death she was one of four charter members remaining active.

From 1930 to 1934, while in the Soviet Union with her father, she traveled as a correspondent covering aviation activities for the New York Herald Tribune, and as a special reporter for The New York Times and Associated Press. While there she was the first American woman to fly a Soviet civil airplane and the first foreigner to own a Soviet glider. She also handled the logistics in Russia for famed aviator Wiley Post's solo round-the-world flight in 1933, and was the correspondent for The New York Times at the coronation of Emperor Pu Yi of Manchukuo in 1934.

=== Marriage and partnership ===
In 1935 she was planning to accompany Post on another round-the-world flight when she eloped with the distinguished foreign correspondent Linton Wells (1893–1976). They spent their honeymoon covering the Italian invasion of Abyssinia (Ethiopia) and the Syrian riots for the Herald Tribune. Wiley Post got Will Rogers to replace her on the flight, on which both later were killed. While in Ethiopia Linton gave Fay a leopard cub for Christmas. They named her The Queen of Sheba, but called her Snooks. Snooks was not the only exotic pet Fay had. Over her life, Fay had two cheetahs, a lemur, and a small fox from the Sahara Desert.

=== Overseas radio broadcasting ===
After covering Hollywood for the Herald Tribune in 1936, she and her husband pioneered overseas radio broadcasts from Latin America in 1938 for The Magic Key of RCA. She was a founding member of the Overseas Press Club and helped establish the Amelia Earhart Memorial Scholarships.

=== World War II ===
In 1939, at the suggestion of President Roosevelt, she and her husband investigated potential African locations for a Jewish homeland. After the outbreak of the war, they headed the US Commercial Company in West Africa buying strategic materials for the war effort.

== Return to United States ==
Returning to the states after the birth of her son Linton II in Luanda in 1946, she was a full-time mother, living for a time on a houseboat. She designed yacht interiors, wrote a syndicated column called "Nautical Notebook" for the Herald Tribune, and got a patent on a furniture design for boats.

She came to Washington, D.C. in 1963 to open the Washington News Bureau for the Storer Broadcasting Company (then the largest privately owned radio and television network in the US). From 1964 to 1977 she served as Storer's White House correspondent. She was the first female broadcaster accredited to the White House, and one of three women reporters chosen to accompany President Nixon to China in 1972.

=== Promotion of aviation ===
During this period she renewed her association with flying and education, beginning with the Amelia Earhart stamp in 1962. She was chairman of the first international 99s convention in 1967 and began encouraging the use of flying and the planting of trees to promote international friendship. In 1976, during the Bicentennial year, this led to the creation of the International Forest of Friendship in Atchison, Kansas, Amelia Earhart's home town. From 1976 she served as Co-General Chairman for the annual ceremonies at the Forest, and was actively planning future events at the time of her death. She also worked to establish several scholarship funds.

== Awards and honors ==
Fay Gillis Wells received many awards in the fields of aviation and broadcasting. These included:

- 1972 Woman of the Year by OX5 Aviation Pioneers
- 1984 Women's Aerospace Achievement Award
- 1984 McDonald Distinguished Statesman & Stateswoman of Aviation Award
- 1998 Esther Van Wagoner Tufty Award for broadcasting and personal achievement
- 2001 Katherine Wright Award for outstanding contributions to aviation
- 2002 Amelia Earhart Pioneering Achievement Award, and the American Women in Radio and Television Lifetime Achievement Award

In 1995, Gene and Carolyn Shoemaker, famous discoverers of comets and asteroids, named Asteroid 4820 in her honor.

In 2009, the Overseas Press Club of America established the Fay Gills Wells Award to honor Wells who was a founding member of the organization in 1939.

== Illness, death and legacy ==
Hospitalized in Falls Church, Virginia with pneumonia for six days during late November 2002, Wells died there from complications related to the disease on December 2, 2002. She was 94 years old.

She was survived by a brother Ken Gillis, of Franklin, Michigan, her son Linton Wells II and daughter-in-law Linda M. Wells, of Springfield, Virginia, grandsons Linton Wells III and Frank M. Wells, and several nieces and nephews. The International Forest of Friendship continues as a living memorial to her contributions.

== See also ==
- Irene McFarland
