= Blue Network =

American radio network (1927–1945)

- Type: Radio network
- Country: United States

Ownership
- Owner: General Electric; (1927–1932); RCA (1932–1943)
- Key people: David Sarnoff (founder); Edward J. Noble; (controlling shareholder, 1943–1945); Mark Woods (president)

History
- Launch date: January 1, 1927 (99 years ago)
- Replaced: "WJZ chain" (RCA; d/b/a; the "radio group")
- Closed: June 15, 1945; (81 years ago)
- Replaced by: American Broadcasting Company (ABC)
- Former names: NBC Blue Network; (1927–1943)

Coverage
- Availability: National, through regional affiliates

The NBC Blue Network was the on-air name of an American radio network, which broadcast from 1927 to 1945.

Originating as a second radio network of the National Broadcasting Company (NBC), the Blue Network was spun off as a separate company in 1942, dropping NBC from its name, and in 1945 became the American Broadcasting Company (ABC).

== Early history ==
The Blue Network dates to 1923, when the Radio Corporation of America acquired WJZ in Newark, New Jersey, from Westinghouse, which had established the station in 1921. WJZ moved to New York City in May of that year. When RCA commenced operations of WRC in Washington, D.C., on August 1, 1923, the root of a network was born, though it did not operate under the name by which it would later become known. Radio historian Elizabeth McLeod said it was not until 1924 that the "Radio Group" formally began network operations.

The core stations of the "Radio Group" were RCA's stations WJZ and WRC, along with the Westinghouse station WBZ, then in Springfield, Massachusetts, and WGY, the General Electric station in Schenectady, New York.

RCA's principal rival before 1926 was the radio broadcasting department of the American Telephone & Telegraph Company. In 1921, AT&T began using this department as a test-bed for equipment being designed and manufactured by its Western Electric subsidiary.

The RCA stations operated at a significant disadvantage to their rival chain. AT&T used its high-quality transmission lines, and declined to lease them out to competing entities, forcing RCA to use the telegraph lines of Western Union, which were not as well calibrated to voice transmission as the AT&T lines.

Nevertheless, the WJZ network sought to compete toe-to-toe with the AT&T network, which was built around a different New York station, WEAF. For example, both stations sent announcer teams to cover the 1924 Democratic National Convention, which was held in Madison Square Garden in New York City. Promotional material produced in 1943 claimed certain "firsts" in broadcasting by WJZ, such as the first educational music program in April 1922, the first World Series broadcasts in 1922, and the first complete opera broadcast, The Flying Dutchman, from the Manhattan Opera House.

== Creation ==
RCA (as well as its consortium partners General Electric and Westinghouse) received a break in 1926, when AT&T made a corporate decision to exit the broadcasting business and focus on its telecommunications business.

The first step by AT&T was to create the Broadcasting Company of America (BCA) on May 15, 1926, to hold its broadcasting assets, which included WEAF and WCAP in Washington. As reported in the press, this move was due to the growth in the radio broadcasting activities of AT&T and the special issues related thereto, though it would appear that subsequent activities in disposing of the assets of BCA may have also played a role in the decision. AT&T did in fact subsequently sell WEAF to RCA for $1 million in July 1926, a price that newspaper reports indicated was a substantial premium over what other stations were commanding in the marketplace, and represented a recognition of the status of WEAF in broadcasting, as well as its access to AT&T's lines. Indeed, the negotiations for the sale may have taken place very shortly after the creation of BCA, as Folder 129 in the NBC History Files at the Library of Congress contains a contract of sale for WEAF dated July 1, 1926. The Oakland Tribune stated that 4/5ths of the purchase price of WEAF could be attributed to goodwill and the line access. On July 28, 1926, the Washington Post reported in a front-page story that RCA had acquired WCAP. The Oakland Tribune reported the same day that WCAP had departed the field, and WRC would be operating on the frequency they had shared, which was 640 AM.

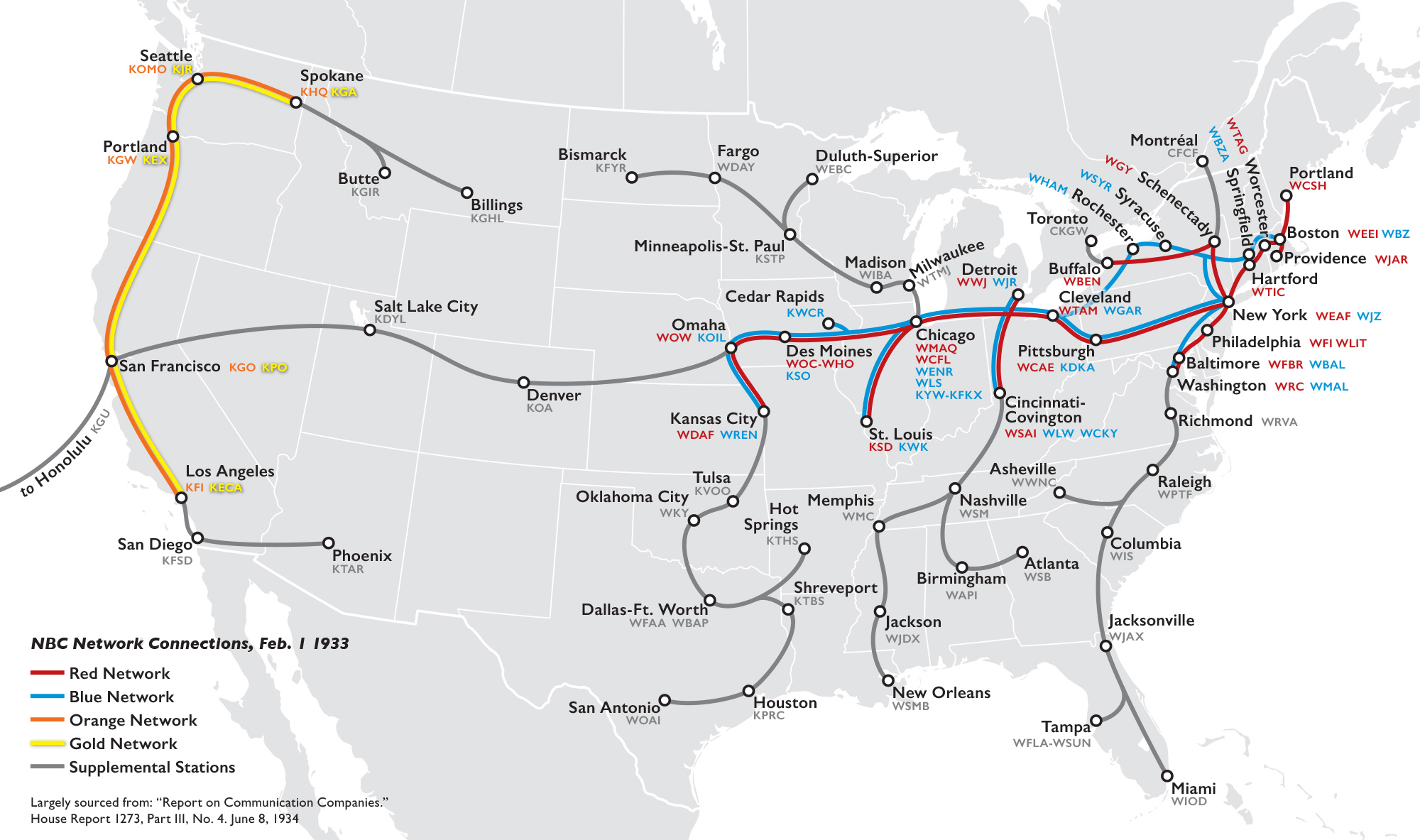
NBC networks, 1933

As part of the reorganization of the broadcasting assets in the wake of the acquisitions, on September 13, 1926, the formation of the National Broadcasting Company (NBC) was announced via newspaper advertisements, and on November 15, 1926, NBC's first broadcast was made. This first broadcast on November 15, 1926, marked NBC's de facto formation of the NBC Red Network from the WEAF network assets, using WEAF as the "key station"; this network in eventual popular image tended to broadcast the most popular entertainment programming. RCA merged its former radio operations into NBC, and on January 1, 1927, WJZ became the "key station" of the Blue Network when its network switch operations began. The network, again in eventual popular image, tended to place its focus more on news and public affairs programming, as well as the "sustaining", or non-sponsored shows.

The Decatur Review (Illinois) for Sunday, December 12, 1926, reported the following in an article describing a broadcast to be sponsored by the Victor Talking Machine Company and aired the following New Year's Day, January 1, 1927, which is a description of this first Blue Network broadcast—note that it makes it clear that January 1, 1927, marked the debut of the Blue Network:

TWO BIG NETWORKS: The network to be used for the first concert will consist of a combination of chains of stations affiliated with WEAF and WJZ, New York. It is also announced that this opening Victor program inaugurates a new chain system to be operated by the National Broadcasting Company, with WJZ as the "key" station. This new chain, which will be known as the "blue" network, will allow simultaneous broadcasting from WJZ through WBZ, Springfield and Boston, KDKA, Pittsburgh, and KYW, Chicago. For broadcasting of the first program, therefore, the "blue" network will be joined with the "red" network, as the WEAF chain is designated, as well as other stations in various cities. Following the New Year's night program, the concerts will be given bi-monthly, through the "blue" network (...)

Allegedly, the color designations came from the way the networks were represented on maps, with red lines (or pushpins) denoting the WEAF network circuits, and blue the WJZ circuits.

== Operations, 1927–1941 ==
=== Cooperation with the Red Network ===
The Red and Blue Networks shared a common pool of engineers and facilities, and would on occasion, broadcast the same events. There are two early examples, from the biggest news events of 1927. On May 20, 1927, both of the NBC networks covered the return of Charles Lindbergh to America from his trans-Atlantic flight, star announcer Graham McNamee doing the honors. Three months later, a combined hookup of 67 stations on the two networks presented the second Dempsey–Tunney fight, broadcast by McNamee and NBC colleague Phillips Carlin. Radio historian Elizabeth McLeod has published a discussion of surviving NBC broadcast material from this era.

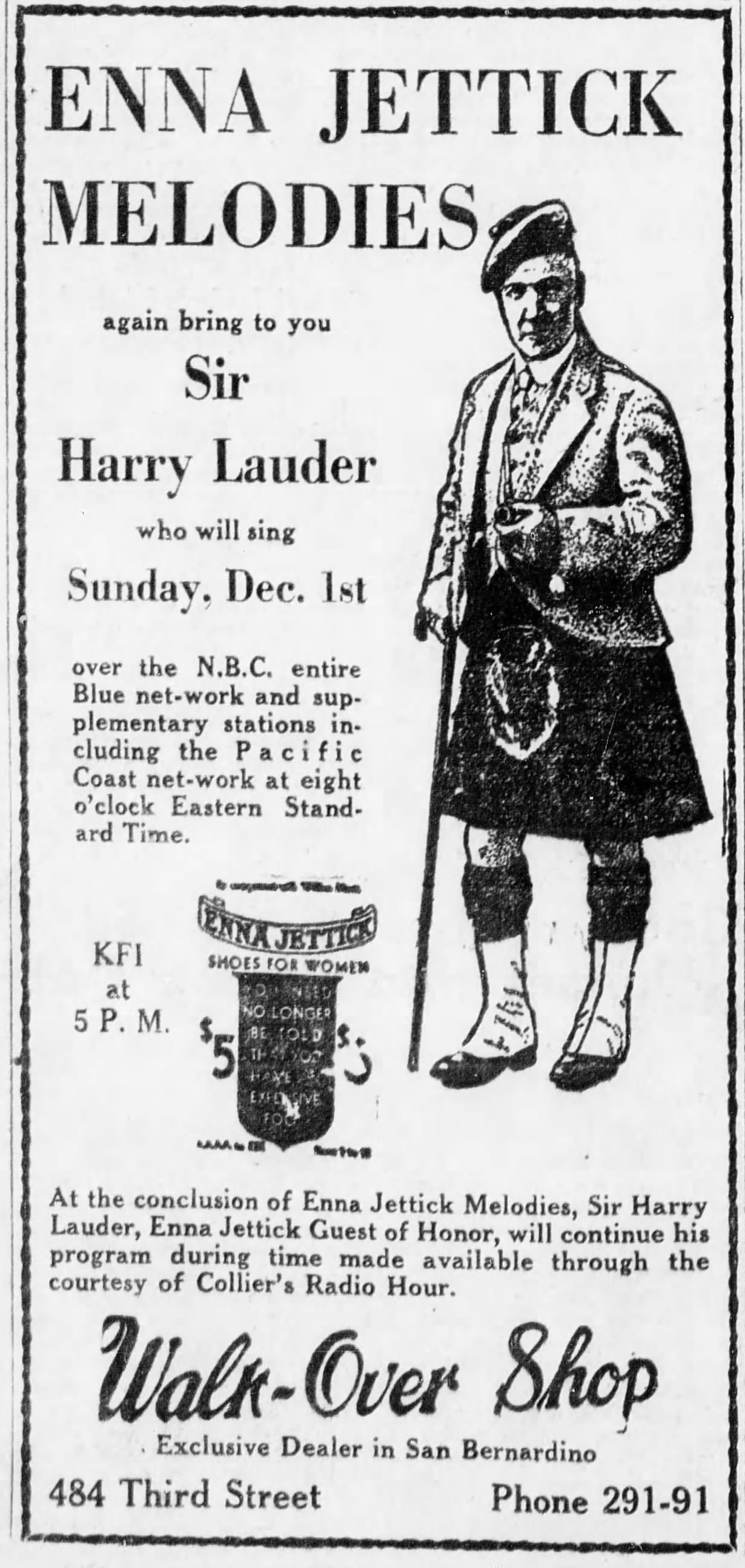
Advertisement placed by the Enna Jettick Shoe Company promoting the appearance of Sir Harry Lauder on its NBC Blue program, December 1, 1929. Note that the text implies that the NBC Blue, NBC Orange (West Coast) and NBC Red networks were all participating in the broadcast.

A slightly later example of cooperation came on the evening of Sunday, December 1, 1929, when the famed "Laird of the Music Halls", Sir Harry Lauder, appeared on a coast-to-coast hookup that originated from KFI in Los Angeles (later an NBC Red station, but at this time part of NBC's West Coast "Orange Network"), but was distributed by WJZ, which, as noted, was the key station of the Blue Network; advertisements suggest that certain NBC Red stations, as well as stations in the Orange Network, supplemented the network. A description of this broadcast is contained in a 1930 pamphlet put out by the Enna Jettick Shoe Company; Enna Jettick sponsored the first of Lauder's performances that night on its "Enna Jettick Melodies" show, which was followed later by another performance during the time ordinarily used by The Collier Hour.

At least as late as January 1939, in spite of the fact that by this time NBC was seeking to differentiate the images of its NBC Red and NBC Blue networks (see below), it would still arrange for special, joint broadcasts, such as a special two-hour presentation of "The Magic Key of RCA" musical program (normally an NBC Blue program, sponsored by RCA's Victor records division) entitled "Salute to 1939."

=== Blue Network function through the mid-1930s ===
Ironically, even though the Blue Network generally was not given the more popular programs, it was the network that broadcast Amos 'n Andy at the height of its popularity in the early 1930s, when on average over half of the nation's radio audience would tune in to the show. During the 1932–1933 season, Standard Oil of New Jersey (Esso) sponsored an unusual program, the Five-Star Theater, which each weeknight presented a show in a different format. The marquee show in this cycle was Flywheel, Shyster, and Flywheel, which starred Groucho Marx and Chico Marx. Considering the show's relatively early (7:30 p.m. ET) time slot, it did rather well in the ratings, but it could not compete with the much stronger ratings produced by Esso's arch-rival Texaco, which sponsored Ed Wynn on NBC Red, and the show ended after one year.

More commonly, the Blue Network would operate as a quasi-"farm team" for the Red Network, in terms of entertainment programs. Bob Hope (in 1935 and again in 1937), Jack Benny (in 1932), Fibber McGee and Molly (in 1935), and Information, Please! (in 1938) are all examples of shows that debuted on the Blue Network before eventually transitioning over to larger audiences on the Red Network.

On occasion, shows would make brief stops at NBC Blue before moving elsewhere, such as the Lux Radio Theatre (1934–35) and Will Rogers' program (1933), both of which would move to CBS.

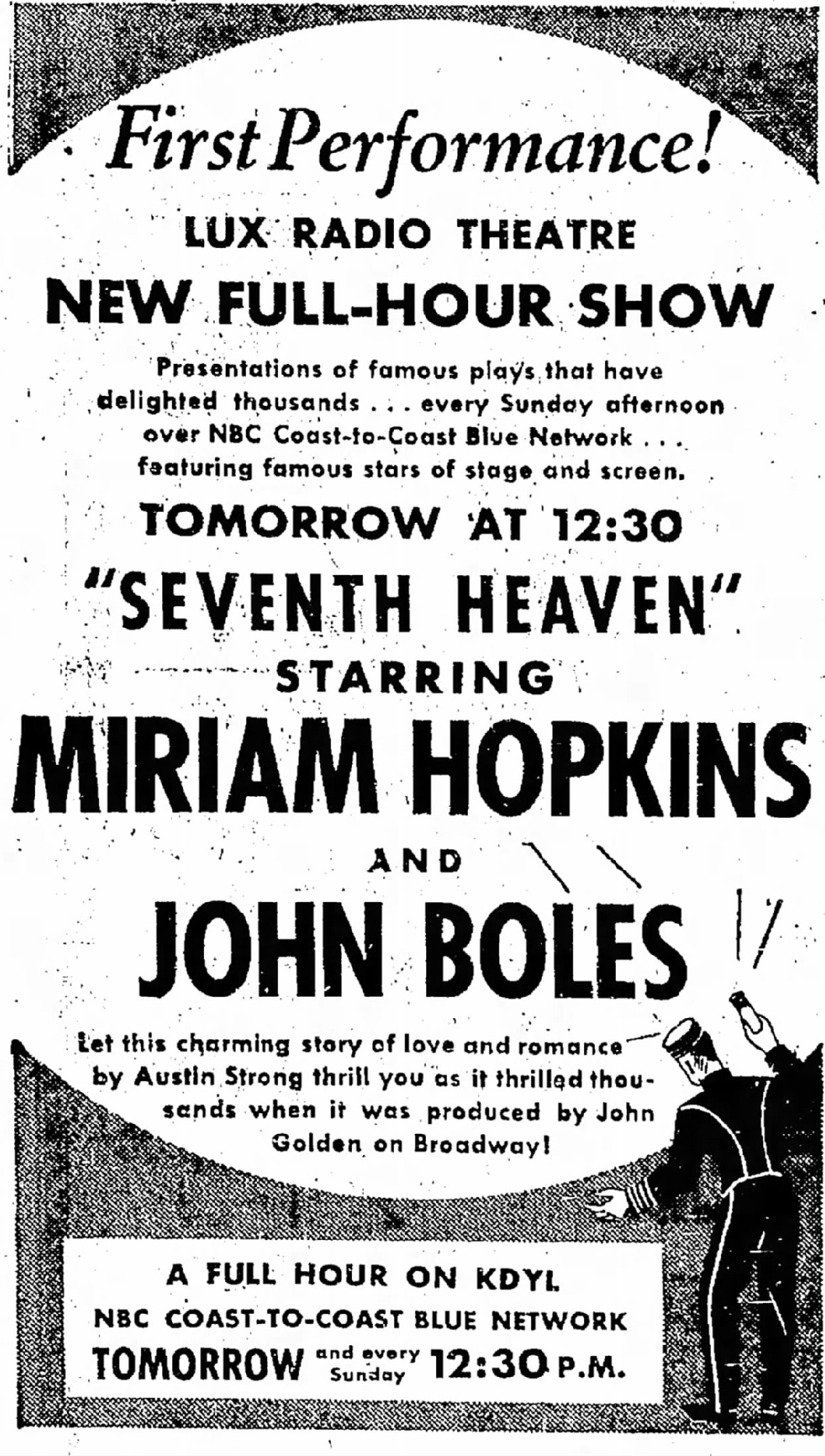
Advertisement advertising the debut of the Lux Radio Theatre, which had a brief run on NBC Blue in 1934–35 before moving for a long run on CBS.

At some level, the Blue Network was known in the late 1920s and early 1930s for its children's programming. There are at least two volumes extant, from an Akron-based publishing house, which are collections of stories which purport to have been part of Blue Network programs. A copy of one, in the collection of E.O. Costello, shows a cover with two children listening to a late 1920s-style radio, from which shimmering images of fairy-tale characters are emerging. Other than the title (and the radio on the cover), the precise nature of the ties to the Blue Network is not known; the book does not even make direct reference to the National Broadcasting Company. It can also be said that this is an indication that the Blue Network had a well-established identity of its own by 1929.

=== Problems ===
The descriptions of the material contained in the NBC History Files at the Library of Congress appear to indicate that at some level, there was discontent with the way NBC was managing the Blue Network vis-à-vis the Red Network. For example, one folder in the NBC History Files contains a three-page letter dated June 28, 1934, from station WSYR in Syracuse, New York, which complains of the neglect of the Blue Network in favor of the Red Network. This point can said to be reinforced firstly by a memorandum dated September 18, 1935, in which the Blue complained about its lack of access to broadcasts of the World Series, and secondly by a letter dated shortly after that, on October 5, 1935, which is a communication from Hearst Radio complaining that Amos 'n Andy and the Al Pearce programs had been moved from the Blue Network to the Red Network, and complaining in general about the weakness of the Blue's programming. Indeed, the NBC History Files contain a February 1937 in-house memorandum so caustic of the performance of the Blue Network that the author's name was redacted from the document.

A significant issue with the NBC Blue Network may have been its size. It started, in January 1927, with 7 stations, had grown to 17 by the end of 1929, but still had only 33 stations by 1937. This would have made it significantly smaller than its rivals. In 1938, Mutual had 107 affiliates, and CBS had 114; the Blue Network, by contrast, was not able to blanket the United States when NBC Red sold out its time, with the result that during 1937–1938, the Blue Network's revenues were generally falling, while NBC Red's increased. McLeod has noted that as of 1938, NBC had 23 stations in its core "Basic Red" group, and 24 in its "Basic Blue" group, with 107 stations that could be Red or Blue depending on the needs of a sponsor; the relative ratings (and thus revenues) for NBC Red programs versus NBC Blue counterparts suggests that sponsors chose to use Red more often than Blue.

=== Image ===
Perhaps more in line with the common perception of the Blue Network as a smaller, but more high-brow and public affairs-centered network was that it was the original home of the NBC Symphony Orchestra broadcasts, led by Maestro Arturo Toscanini. In a similar vein, one of the Blue Network's longest running programs was America's Town Meeting of the Air, a current-affairs discussion program. Both Lowell Thomas and Walter Winchell's news programs were also broadcast over the Blue Network. Both of these shows were the Blue's highest rated programs in the late 1930s and early 1940s. In an interesting variation on the talent shows hosted by Major Bowes, the Sherwin-Williams paint company sponsored the Metropolitan Opera Auditions of the Air for a number of years on Sunday afternoons in the 1930s and 1940s, in which singers competed for a chance to win contracts with the famed opera troupe. The National Farm and Home Hour, a show backed for many years by the U.S. Department of Agriculture, was one of the Blue Network's standout daytime programs, and would be a part of its lineup from 1929 until March 1945, when the program shifted to NBC.

Along with the NBC Symphony Orchestra broadcasts, the Metropolitan Opera radio broadcasts were part of the "crown jewels" of NBC Blue. A sober, dignified pamphlet issued by the network in 1937 stated that the broadcasts were under RCA sponsorship, and "[t]hrough the medium of nationwide NBC Network broadcasting, Grand Opera has been given to the entire nation. No longer is it reserved for the privileged few – now even the most isolated listeners throughout the United States are able to enjoy the world's finest music at their own firesides. The National Broadcasting Company (...) is proud to be the means of bringing the Metropolitan Opera to American radio listeners." The pamphlet notes that 78 stations broadcast these opera performances in 1937, and that reception for the program was "nationwide", something moderately unusual for an NBC Blue broadcast.

Radio historian Elizabeth McLeod has suggested, aside from a brief period where NBC Red and NBC Blue had different chime-sequences in the late 1920s and early 1930s, the two networks were *not* differentiated for many years, which would certainly be consistent with the roster of shows described above. She points out, with some justice, that NBC Red also broadcast a number of high-brow programs such as The Voice of Firestone, The Atwater Kent Hour, and the Cities Service Concerts. Furthermore, she points out that until the 1936–1937 period, the "back office" support for the networks was the same, and often stations would shift from one network to another, depending on sponsor needs. It was only when the Federal Communications Commission began investigating network practices, McLeod believes, that efforts were made by RCA to differentiate the two networks, and to fully position NBC Blue as a high-brow/public affairs network. (In the same light, it has been suggested that the congressional pressure was the real reason the NBC Symphony Orchestra was created.)

The NBC History Files at the Library of Congress lend support to the notion that NBC was gradually groping for a way to differentiate the Red Network from the Blue Network. For example, they contain a confidential memorandum, dated May 13, 1936, which sets forth a network policy against mixing the Red and Blue network stations. (Compare and contrast this with the way the Harry Lauder broadcast of 1929 was handled, above.) There also exists an October 1938 sales force memorandum, which contains talking points on how to differentiate the Blue Network from the Red Network and CBS. Even as far back as December 1932, NBC had set forth a policy banning specific references not only to CBS, but even to the Red Network.

Of note is the fact that NBC began to step up efforts to expand the network; while it had 33 stations in 1937, this total had nearly tripled by January 1941, when the network had 92 stations coast to coast.

These efforts to expand the network are evidenced by an NBC publication in late 1936, Great and Growing Greater, which described efforts to increase both the size and quality of Blue Network stations. Among the improvements cited and proposed were increasing the broadcast power of WJZ and KDKA to 50,000 watts each, adding new stations to the group such as WEAN, WICC and WEBR, adding a Pacific Coast network (with KGO, KECA, KFSD, KEX, KJR and KGA) and expanding the daytime power of such stations as KOIL, KWK and KSO. This ad campaign, in a booklet tipped into the book, also showed a lengthy list of sponsors that had purchased Blue Network time. As the book states: "All of these additions and improvements are daily increasing the effectiveness of the NBC Blue Network. All contribute considerably to the listener's pleasure and to the advertiser's sales results."

In the months leading up to the January 1942 spinoff of the Blue Network, NBC undertook vigorous steps to create separate brand images for the Red and Blue Networks. To a certain extent, this had been going on since at least the summer of 1939, when Time magazine indicated that NBC was undertaking an extensive build-up of NBC Blue. In both the fall of 1937, and the fall of 1941, NBC would specifically identify a program as being broadcast on the "Red Network of the National Broadcasting Company", and at least in the fall of 1941, would have a similar tag for the Blue Network. An example of this buildup comes in "Alice in Sponsor-Land", a publication put out by RCA some time in mid-1941 to market that network's shows. This book focuses squarely on the Red Network, describing its entertainment programming, without any reference to the Blue Network. Above the lineup of stations in the back of the volume is the tag-line: "This is the Red Network of the National Broadcasting Company." In addition, throughout the book are slogans such as "Any time is Good Time on NBC Red!" This book, in part, demonstrates exactly how NBC differentiated the Red Network from the Blue Network in the fall of 1941, when, as noted, the Blue Network was still a part of NBC.

==== Programming, 1935–1941 ====
What follows are some examples of the programming on NBC Blue that illustrate a gradual shift in tone.

The official website for Helen Hayes shows a number of programs that she did for NBC Blue during this time, including a Eugene O'Neill play cycle in August 1937, two different dramatic series of her own in 1935–1936 (one sponsored by General Foods), and an appearance on a Blue series in 1940, one which brought famous people who would explain why a particular book has been their favorite.

On February 4, 1937, NBC Blue began broadcasting Ohio School of the Air's "Men Who Made History" series, later renamed "Men Who Made America". The educational series was designed for schoolroom audiences and featured a different historical figure each week with their dramatized life story, e.g. novelist and editor William Dean Howells (1837–1920) was showcased on March 4, 1937.

The "preview" section of the November 28, 1938, edition of Time gives some idea of the kind of programming that the Blue Network carried. On Friday, November 25 at 4 p.m., it carried a speech by then-Secretary of State Cordell Hull. Later that night, it carried the welterweight championship fight from Madison Square Garden, followed by Wagnerian opera from Chicago's Lyric Opera. Saturday, November 26 shows that the Blue carried both the Army–Navy football game and the NBC Symphony Orchestra. The Town Meeting of the Air on Thursday night carried a debate among economists as to whether an economic plan for world peace was possible.

For one season in the early 1940s, a high-profile sponsored program on the Blue was The Cavalcade of America, a show dramatizing historical events which was sponsored by DuPont. The show, which debuted in 1935 on CBS and moved to the Blue in January 1940, was created at a time when the firm was under attack for being, in effect, a "merchant of death", and this show, which focused on American historical figures, was one way DuPont tried to burnish its image. Certainly, the show had high production values, as can be witnessed by its use of Raymond Massey for a show in February 1940 on Abraham Lincoln, as described in the February 26, 1940, issue of Time. It was also known for the use of university professors to vet the historical accuracy of the stories, as well as scripts by future Pulitzer Prize-winner Arthur Miller. (This show would eventually stay with NBC Red and NBC, starting in 1941, and the network would continue to broadcast the show even into the age of television).

An interesting perspective can be seen on one of the most dramatic days in the history of network radio. On the morning of the Japanese attack on Pearl Harbor on December 7, 1941, while the first attack wave was over Oahu, NBC Blue was broadcasting The Inspector General, as part of its Great Plays program, while NBC Red was broadcasting a program with popular bandleader Sammy Kaye. At 4 p.m., ET, the Blue's broadcasts of the National Vespers was interrupted by various news reports. Later in the evening, at 6:30 p.m. and 6:45 p.m., Drew Pearson's and Eleanor Roosevelt's regular broadcasts are heard, followed at 7 p.m. by a news roundup show that competed with Jack Benny, and later on Bible Week opposite the Chase and Sanborn Hour with Edgar Bergen. (The Blue did have the popular Inner Sanctum mystery anthology series later that night at 8:30, followed in turn by its number one show with Walter Winchell.) Lastly, of interest to those who may recall the satiric references in Warner Bros. cartoons of the era, at 10 p.m., the Blue carried The Goodwill Hour with John J. Anthony, dispensing advice to those who sought it, and who presumably were not tuned into Phil Spitalny's orchestra on the Red network.

=== Proposed sale ===
During the late 1930s, NBC seriously considered disposing of the Blue Network on its own initiative. There are substantial materials contained in the NBC History Files at the Library of Congress illustrating this point. The fact that David Sarnoff, the head of RCA, was involved in these discussions indicates the high level at which this proposal was given consideration. A plain reading of the finding guide at the Library of Congress on the NBC History Files does not disclose the precise nature of these discussions, though the fact that these discussions existed is of record. In 1943, after the Blue Network had been spun off (but before its eventual sale), a promotional publication noted that:

"As far back as 1932, a group of executives of the National Broadcasting Company conceived the idea that The Blue Network could progress faster and serve its stations, its advertisers and the listening public much better if, instead of being a part of NBC it were to become an independent network."

== Divestiture, 1940–1943 ==
=== Initial moves by the FCC ===
During the 1930s, accusations were leveled at both NBC and CBS, in part by their rival Mutual, that the two senior network systems engaged in a series of anticompetitive activities, by locking up talent through in-house talent bureaus, and tightly tying together the system of affiliated stations through onerous contracts.

In May 1940, after a three-year investigation, the Federal Communications Commission (which had had oversight over radio broadcasting since 1934) issued a scathing report (the "Report on Chain Broadcasting") attacking the affiliation policies of NBC and CBS, as well as the talent booking agency practices. The report proposed limiting each network to one affiliated station per city, which would have had a direct impact on NBC's dual-network ownership. In May 1941, the FCC went a step further and issued formal rules to break up what it perceived to be monopolies in radio; one of these rules specifically barred a network from operating more than one hookup, which would have been aimed directly at NBC's ownership of its two networks, in a manner even more explicit than the June 1940 report.

=== Litigation against NBC ===
Subsequent congressional hearings in the fall of 1941 resulted in the FCC watering down the rules, but the reprieve was short-lived, as the antitrust division of the Department of Justice, on December 31, 1941, filed an antitrust action against NBC and CBS, seeking to break up the networks' methods of operation. Mutual, at the same time, filed an antitrust suit of its own, in the amount of $10.275 million, according to the January 12, 1942, edition of Time.

This account by Time describes at least one of the accusations leveled against NBC by Mutual, from an affidavit by Mutual's general manager. In the fall of 1941, Mutual debuted a comedy-variety series sponsored by Ballantine Ale, called Three Ring Time, starring Milton Berle and Charles Laughton. The show was set to debut on a 77-station network, but 14 of these stations were under contract to NBC, which had the power to exercise options on the most desirable time, in cities where there was limited competition. NBC eventually exercised options for six of these stations, with the result that Three Ring Time was being carried simultaneously on NBC Blue and Mutual.

While the antitrust suits were pending, NBC and CBS had appealed to the courts regarding the ability of the FCC to regulate the operations of radio networks. While these appeals were in progress, NBC started the process of formally separating the operations of the Red Network and the Blue Network, a process which had begun in 1939 with the formation of a separate sales department for the Blue Network and which continued into 1940 and 1941 with the formation of other departments for the Blue Network. NBC began to specifically identify the networks, contrary to its general practice, and began to divide personnel and facilities; eventually, it formed a separate corporate entity for the Blue Network on January 8, 1942, "Blue Network Company, Inc." From this date on, while NBC still maintained ownership of the Blue Network, it was for most purposes an entirely separate network. NBC Red at this point became known as simply NBC.

This 1944 advertisement for KATE in Albert Lea, Minnesota, while it dates from after the sale by NBC of the Blue Network, shows how the Blue Network continued to have access to NBC facilities; in this case, the famed radio studios at Rockefeller Center in New York City.

In June 1942, The United States Supreme Court upheld the jurisdiction of the FCC over the issuance of rules relating to chain broadcasting. While the FCC litigation continued in the wake of this ruling, the public and private antitrust litigation was held in abeyance.

On May 10, 1943, the Supreme Court (National Broadcasting Co. v. United States, 319 U.S. 190) upheld the right of the FCC to regulate practically everything that was radio, by sustaining the jurisdiction of the FCC to regulate the contractual relations of the major networks with affiliated stations. Efforts in late 1943 before the Senate Interstate Commerce Committee to obtain legislation to, in effect, reverse the decision went nowhere.

=== Sale ===
The January 11, 1943, edition of Time states that seven investment houses, three insurance companies, two manufacturers, a daily newspaper, and an industrialist had all taken serious looks at purchasing the network. However, with the ruling from the Supreme Court, NBC was now spurred to take vigorous action to sell the Blue Network. The bidding came down to three groups, with an initial bid of $6 million, which was raised in sequence by rivals to $6.5 and then $7 million. In late July 1943, the investment banking firm of Dillon, Read & Co. made a bid of $7.8 million.

On July 30, 1943, just over two months after the court's ruling, RCA announced the sale of the network to American Broadcasting System, Inc., a firm controlled by Edward J. Noble, a former undersecretary of commerce who was better known as the chairman of Life Savers Corp. The price was announced as $8 million. This was followed by a petition to the FCC to approve the sale, which was filed on August 13.

=== FCC hearings ===
One of the significant issues surrounding the sale of the Blue Network involved the network's practices regarding "controversial" topics and proponents. The network, citing the code of the National Association of Broadcasters, declined to sell time to labor organizations, cooperatives, and other organizations advocating "controversial topics", but did give them free air time, provided there was an opportunity for the other side to be heard. On August 27, 1943, the Congress of Industrial Organizations filed a brief in a petition to intervene in the FCC proceedings on the network sale. The CIO complained that the NAB code regarding "controversial" broadcasts inhibited its ability to buy airtime. While the FCC denied the CIO's petition to intervene, it did invite the CIO to give testimony in the hearings.

At the hearings held on September 10, 1943, FCC Chairman James L. Fly roundly denounced the policy of the Blue Network in refusing to sell airtime, but granting air time for free, to proponents of controversial broadcasts. He colorfully described the policy as chasing would-be purchasers from the front of the shop, but "directing them to the back door for a handout." Mark Woods, the head of the Blue Network, defended the policy, stating that it was in compliance with the NAB code. When Edward J. Noble testified at the hearings held on September 20, 1943, he was questioned closely by Chairman Fly as to the policies regarding the refusal to sell air time to labor organizations, cooperatives and other special interest groups. Noble was directed by Chairman Fly at this hearing to submit a statement as to what the policy would be of the Blue Network in terms of "the expansion of the mechanisms of free speech." On October 3, 1943, Noble released a letter to the FCC in which it was stated that the Blue Network would meet "with an open mind" all requests for broadcasting time, "considering each on the merits", and excluding none on the basis of ideas or personality. Certainly, not all were pleased by Chairman Fly's stance. Columnist David Lawrence, in his October 7, 1943, column, thought that the FCC had overstepped its authority in attempting to force the Blue Network to change its policies regarding the sale of airtime.

Noble's written response seems to have been sufficient. The sale was approved by the FCC on October 12, 1943. Noble was forced to divest himself of New York station WMCA, which he had owned since 1940, but his American Broadcasting System, Inc., the entity formed to be the parent of the Blue Network, acquired WJZ, additional stations in Chicago and San Francisco, as well as land-line leases, certain studio facilities and leased studio facilities, and the affiliation system.

=== Antitrust conclusion ===
Jessie Royce Landis (l) and Celeste Holm (r) pose with a Blue Network microphone in this 1943 publicity still for the show The House on Q Street. Collection of E.O. Costello.

Following the sale, the Department of Justice dropped its antitrust proceedings against NBC on October 17, 1943, having previously dropped proceedings against CBS on October 11, and the federal courts, upon its motion, dismissed Mutual's antitrust claims against CBS and NBC.

== Changes: 1943–1945 ==
In the April 21, 1947, issue of Time, Mark Woods called the Blue Network of 1942 (that is, just before the sale) "a dump." The article describes the then 116-station network as the home of cast-off speeches and classical music, which had only generated $14 million in revenue. It could, perhaps, be argued that Woods was denigrating the state of the Blue Network at that time, to contrast with the relative success of the network later in the 1940s; this is possible in light of the fact that the Blue Network had been profitable in 1942. Woods and the rest of the management team, after the sale to Noble, began to take steps to make the Blue Network more competitive with NBC and CBS.

=== Finances and ownership ===
An early step was to obtain a deep-pocketed backer. Noble, on December 28, 1943, sold a 12.5% stake to Time Inc., and a similar stake to advertising executive Chester J. LaRoche, for $500,000 each. Smaller stakes were taken by Blue Network executives Mark Woods (president) and Edgar Kobak (executive vice-president, who would the next year leave the Blue for Mutual).

Advertisement promoting a broadcast of the long-running NBC Blue, Blue Network and ABC public affairs program, "Town Meeting of the Air." Note that even at this late date, in 1947 (i.e. 20 months after the official change), ABC is still using the Blue Network tag for certain promotional purposes.

=== Programming ===
During the 1943–1945 period, the Blue Network used many of the NBC broadcasting facilities, including the Radio City facilities in New York (see the KATE ad, above), as well as studio space in Los Angeles. The back of the ticket for "Fun Valley", a show starring veteran comedian Al Pearce, sponsored by Dr Pepper and broadcast on Sunday afternoons in 1944, makes reference to both Blue Network Company, Inc. and the National Broadcasting Company, Inc. in terms of the rules and regulations audience members had to obey.

Of obvious import were steps taken to preserve the best programming the network had, and make improvements; these were happening in the period immediately prior to, and following, the sale of the network. While the Blue Network did lose a few programs to NBC, such as Quiz Kids and Duffy's Tavern (more shows that debuted or had a previous run on the Blue; see Lackmann, op. cit.) and the NBC Symphony Orchestra (Lackmann, op. cit.), it did retain one highly rated show, the Jergens Journal with Walter Winchell, which managed to compete successfully with NBC's powerhouse Sunday night lineup (it was the 11th-ranked program for all of 1943–1944, and Blue's only program in the top 20). The Blue Network also retained the rights to broadcast the Metropolitan Opera radio broadcasts; Milton Cross was the host for NBC, Blue, ABC, CBS, and the opera's own broadcasts from 1931 through 1975. This was in spite of the fact that NBC did not want to assign the rights to either the Town Meeting of the Air or the Metropolitan Opera broadcasts to the Blue Network.

In an interview with Time published on January 11, 1943, Woods noted that the Blue Network was seeking to differentiate itself from NBC and CBS by the aggressive use of transcriptions, contrary to the practice of the larger networks. This would have its full fruition when Bing Crosby started transcribing his prime-time shows in 1946.

In certain respects, the Blue made attempts to grab the spotlight with unusual broadcasts. On December 25, 1942, the Coca-Cola Company sponsored an all-day broadcast on the network, a "Victory Parade's Christmas Party of Spotlight Bands". The hiring, in 1943, of noted bandleader Paul Rodgers as Director of Music was an attempt by the network, in its own words, to strengthen the entire musical schedule, as well as obtain a prominent figure. The "Metropolitan Auditions of the Air", discussed above, had moved to the Blue Network by 1943 as well, joining the Metropolitan Opera broadcasts and the Boston Symphony Orchestra.

1944 souvenir booklet for the Blue Network audience participation show Ladies Be Seated, which would continue to have a multi-year run on ABC radio. This show was also one of the first programs to be televised by ABC. A script survives from a February 25, 1945, local broadcast over WRGB, the Schenectady, New York television station of General Electric, hosted by Johnny Olson. The network is referred to in the script as being "The Blue Network of the American Broadcasting Company."

News continued to be a priority for the network; indeed, Raymond Swing would win a Peabody Award for the network in 1944 for his news commentary. A 1943 promotional pamphlet listed Swing, Walter Winchell, Martin Agronsky, Drew Pearson, Lowell Thomas and Dorothy Thompson, among others, as part of "the most impressive roster of news analysts and commentators on the air today." Newsman George Hicks was on a landing craft heading to the Normandy invasion beaches on D-Day when it was strafed by enemy planes, the sound of the combat being broadcast. The network did have some difficulty with its news commentators during the war, however. The February 22, 1943, edition of Time notes that Woods had to clamp down on both Walter Winchell and Drew Pearson for over-aggressive name calling in their broadcasts, much to their dismay.

==== Blue Network Programs ====
Several programs can be cited to show how the Blue Network was striving to reach beyond its previous reputation, and compete head-on with CBS and NBC as a stand-alone network.

One ambitious broadcast, copies of which are generally available to collectors of old-time radio broadcasts, was a special two-hour program broadcast on Christmas Day, 1944. Entitled "Christmas on the Blue", the show was emceed by Gracie Fields, and featured, among other stars, Joe E. Brown, The Andrews Sisters, Ed Wynn, Paul Whiteman and others. The show also featured broadcasts of overseas servicemen sending greetings and well wishes to their loved ones at home, something unusual for the era.

One of the pairings on this special program involved Wendell Niles, a long-time announcer on many radio shows, including Bob Hope's. The Blue Network gave him and partner Don Prindle a comedy series, Niles and Prindle, which is referenced in the special as being scheduled for a debut the following month. It was said to involve two friends "who argued about everything", and had a brief run in 1945. It was certainly unusual for the Blue Network to attempt to convert a long-time announcer into a featured comedy star, and in this sense, "Niles and Prindle", if not unique (given that Graham McNamee was the "Perfect Foil" to Ed Wynn), it must be said to be at least quite singular.

Of interest to animation fans was a show called Nitwit Court, which sought to do to John J. Anthony's The Goodwill Hour what It Pays to Be Ignorant did to Information, Please!. Host Ransom Sherman would pose problems to a jury consisting of Arthur Q. Bryan, as "Willow", a man with a lisp, Mel Blanc, as "Hornblower", a fumbling motorboat owner, and Sara Berner as "Bubbles Lowbridge", a not terribly bright woman (all three of whom are most commonly associated with Warner Bros.' Looney Tunes and Merrie Melodies cartoon series).

=== Affiliate growth ===
Matchbooks advertising the Blue Network affiliated stations in Indianapolis and Cleveland, from between 1943 (when WJW joined the Blue Network) and 1945

Matchbook from WFCI/1420 (now defunct) at Pawtucket, Rhode Island

Strengthening the affiliate station list was a matter of importance to the network. While the network had 116 stations in January 1942 and 155 stations as of June 1943, this still meant that it could only offer to advertisers coverage of approximately 76% of the radio homes in the United States. In this sense, the moves by the FCC to loosen the provisions of the contracts binding affiliated stations to networks helped the Blue Network. This allowed it to pick up a few additional stations in 1944, including (ironically) a few from the Mutual Broadcasting System. This was one of its priorities, as the Blue Network had inherited smaller and less powerful stations than NBC and CBS.

=== Rebranding ===
Finally, a major priority of the Blue Network was to form a new identity, one that would mark a break with the past. In December 1944, the FCC approved the transfer of The Blue Network, Inc.'s broadcast licenses to American Broadcasting Company. Beginning on January 22, 1945, the network's opening and closing announcements changed to "The Blue Network of the American Broadcasting Company." Starting February 18, the same wording was instituted as the network outcue for station breaks. On June 15, 1945, the Blue Network formally changed its name to the American Broadcasting Company. They were not alone in desiring this catchy acronym. Two prior claimants were bought out prior to June 1945, and in negotiations with the Associated Broadcasting Corp. In December 1945, it acquired the rights to the name "ABC" from yet a third party. From June 1945 forward, the entity has been known generally as the American Broadcasting Company, and reference should be made to that entry for its subsequent history.

The souvenir program for the Maurice B. Sachs Amateur Hour broadcast of Sunday, September 30, 1945, refers to the broadcast as coming from "Blue Network Studio A." Even into 1947, in some markets, ABC would promote its shows with the tag-line "It's a Blue Network Program!"

== Television ==
By June 1945, commercial television in the United States had been frozen, owing to the lower level of priorities given to it as compared to war work. Furthermore, ABC was generally slow to move into television broadcasting. It did win approval to build five television stations; the first, WJZ-TV in New York was completed in the summer of 1948. WJZ-TV (whose callsign would later be transferred to a new ABC affiliate — and current CBS owned-and-operated station — in Baltimore) was followed by stations in Chicago and Detroit later in 1948; and San Francisco and Los Angeles during 1949–all five stations were assigned to broadcast on channel 7. (Four of these five stations are still owned and operated by ABC, with WXYZ-TV now owned by the E.W. Scripps Company.) Until those stations were built, ABC had to lease time and studio facilities from other stations including DuMont network New York flagship WABD, as well as other stations in Philadelphia and Washington which eventually helped form the core of the ABC television network. It might be supposed that the Blue Network never existed in television, but as noted above, the Blue Network did make at least a few known forays into television prior to the June 1945 name change. For example, the Blue Network applied for a construction permit for a TV station in the upper VHF band, but all such applications were shelved during the war years. Experiments were also conducted by the Blue Network in television program production before it permanently became ABC and formally opened a network under the ABC name in 1948. The script for a February 25, 1945, broadcast of Ladies Be Seated, which was a relatively popular audience-participation/stunt game show on Blue Network radio, still exists, and is reprinted in full in Ritchie. It is, in fact, the script for the first broadcast. It was hosted by Johnny Olson, who would later become the long-running announcer on most of CBS's Goodson-Todman-produced game shows, most notably Match Game and The Price Is Right. Technically, this was not a network broadcast, as it was broadcast locally on WRGB, the General Electric television station in Schenectady, New York. However, the opening title card, according to the script, was for "The Blue Network of the American Broadcasting Company." No kinescope or video transfer of this broadcast is known to exist.

== Blue Network stations ==
As noted above, during the 1930s and 1940s, the Blue Network was divided into groups of stations. The core group of stations was known as "Basic Blue", and covered the Northeast United States/New England and portions of the Upper Midwest, around the Great Lakes area. The Southern Blue Network covered the Deep South, the Mountain Blue Group the Mountain states, the Pacific Coast Blue Network the Pacific Coast states, and the Southwestern Blue Group the Oklahoma-Texas region.

A pamphlet published by the American Rolling Mill Co. in connection with a radio talk on "The Miracle of Steel" given on the Blue Network on April 9, 1939, has a listing of the Blue Network stations participating in this broadcast. They are as follows:

Basic Blue
WJZ	New York	WHK	Cleveland
WBZ	Boston	WSPD	Toledo
WBZA	Springfield	WXYZ	Detroit
WEAN	Providence	WOWO	Ft. Wayne
WICC	Bridgeport	WENR	Chicago
WFIL	Philadelphia	KXOK	St. Louis
WBAL	Baltimore	WMT	Cedar Rapids
WMAL	Washington	WTCN	Minneapolis–St. Paul
WSYR	Syracuse	KSO	Des Moines
WHAM	Rochester	KOIL	Omaha
WEBR	Buffalo	WREN	Kansas City
KDKA	Pittsburgh	WLW	Cincinnati

Southern Blue
WMPS	Memphis
WSGN	Birmingham
WAGA	Atlanta
WDSU	New Orleans
WJBO	Baton Rouge

Rocky Mountain Blue
KVOD	Denver
KLO	Ogden
KUTA	Salt Lake City

Pacific Coast Blue
KGO	San Francisco
KECA	Los Angeles
KEX	Portland
KJR	Seattle
KGA	Spokane
KFSD	San Diego
KTMS	Santa Barbara

Southwestern Blue
KTOK	Oklahoma City
KGKO	Ft. Worth–Dallas
KXYZ	Houston

Other Blue Network basic stations in 1939 were WABY (Albany, New York); WJTN (Jamestown, New York); WRTD (Richmond, Virginia); WLEU (Erie, Pennsylvania); CFCF (Montreal, Quebec) and WMFF in Plattsburgh, New York.

== See also ==
- Metropolitan Opera radio broadcasts
- Listen to 1937 broadcast recordings of the "Men Who Made America" series.Radioechoes
