= The Collier Hour =

Radio drama anthology

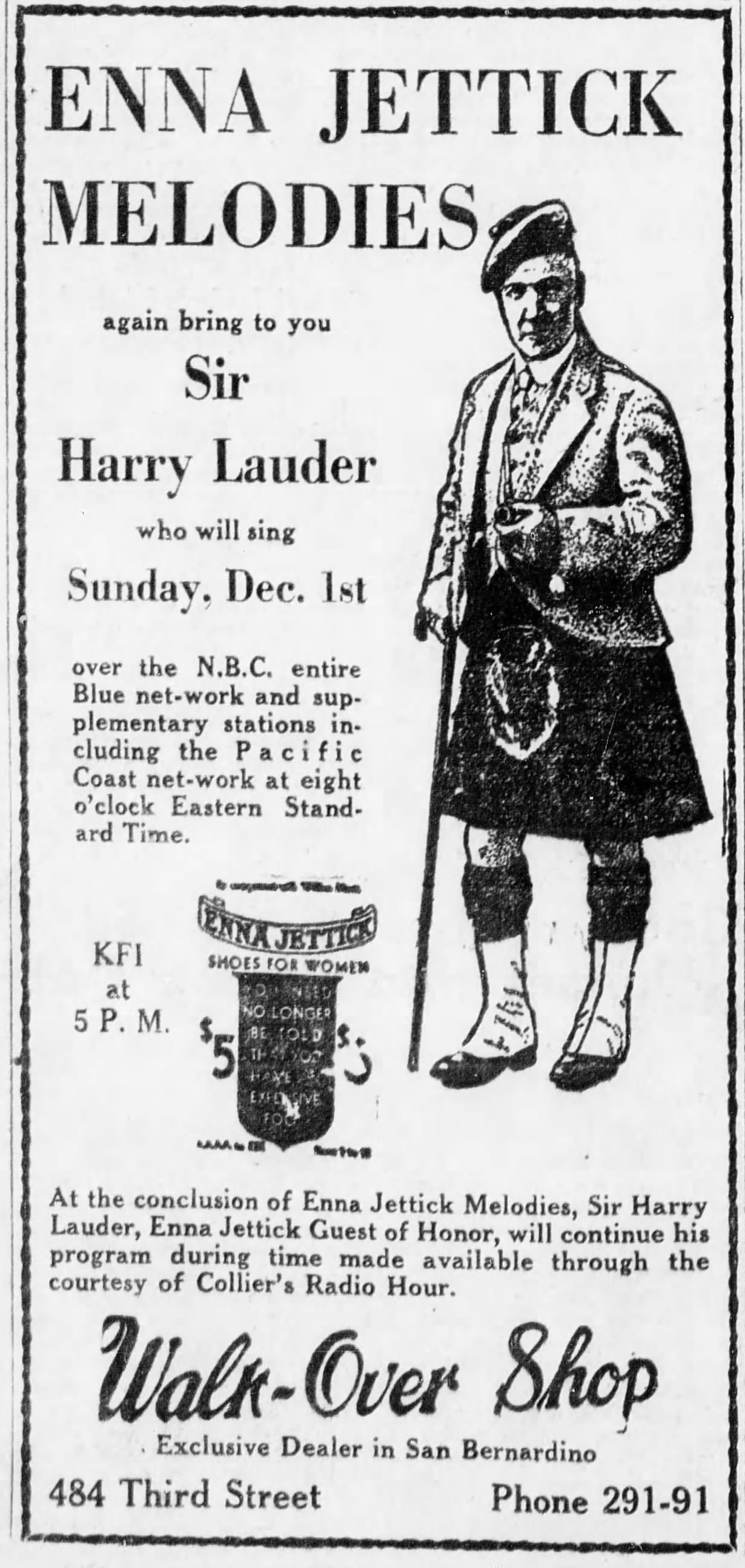
On December 1, 1929, The Collier Hour listeners heard Sir Harry Lauder, as noted in this ad from the Enna Jettick Shoe Company promoting his appearance on its NBC Blue program. The text indicates that The Collier Hour --which was pre-empted that week to give Sir Lauder more airtime-- was also known as Collier's Radio Hour.

The Collier Hour, also known as Collier's Radio Hour, broadcast on the NBC Blue Network from 1927 to 1932, was radio's first major dramatic anthology.

== Production ==
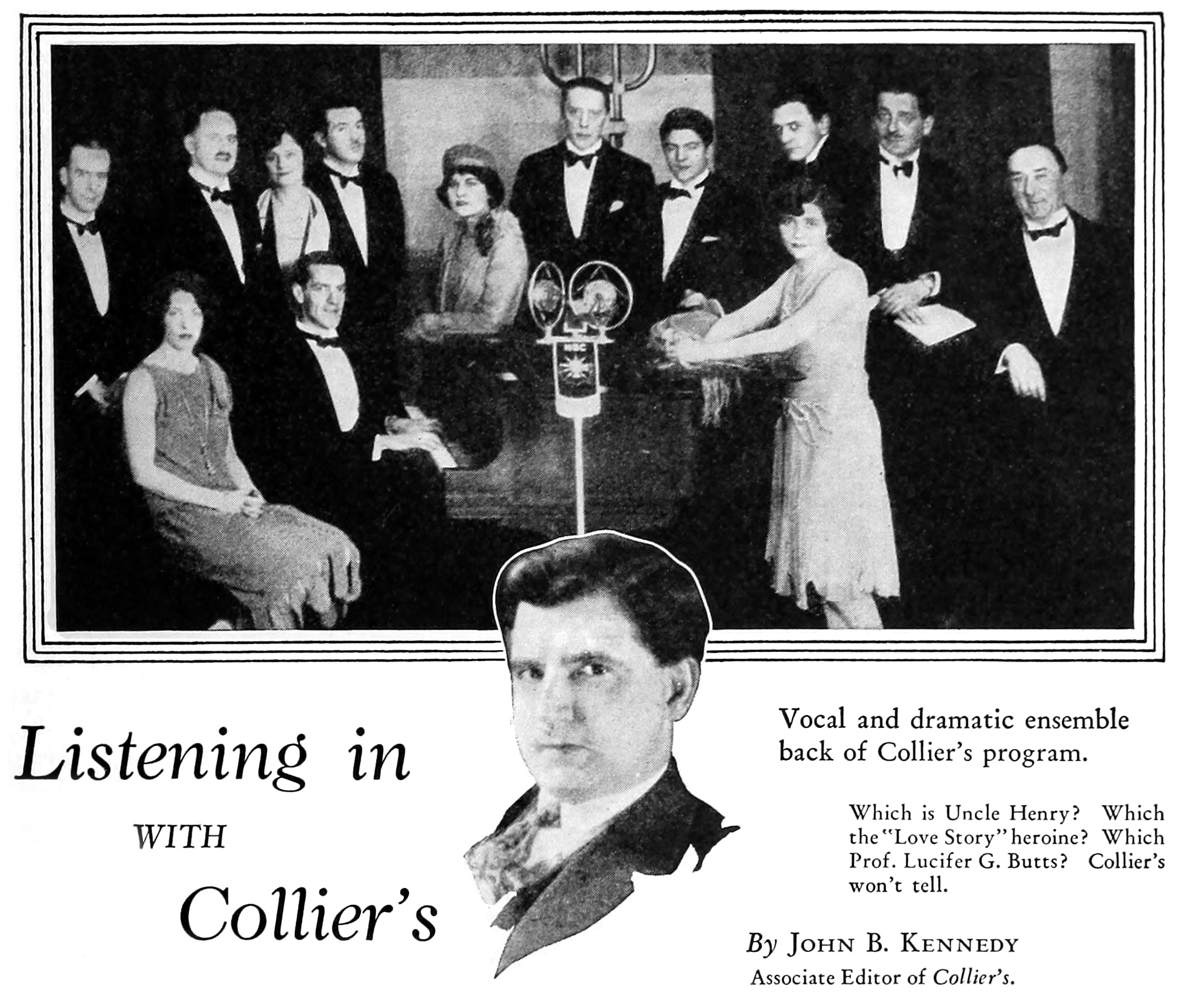
The uncredited ensemble presenting The Collier Hour in a feature story by John B. Kennedy, associate editor of Collier's (1930)

The Collier Hour offered adaptations of stories and serials from Collier's magazine in a calculated move to increase subscriptions and compete with The Saturday Evening Post. Airing on the Wednesday prior to each week's distribution of the magazine, the program soon moved to 8:15pm on Sundays in order to avoid spoilers with dramatizations of stories simultaneously appearing in the magazine.

Story segments during the hour-long program were introduced by a host known as the Editor (portrayed by John B. Kennedy, Jack Arthur, Phil Barrison and Arthur Hughes). Directed by Colonel Thomas Davis, the series was created and produced by Malcolm LaPrade (1892 -1974) with music under the supervision of his brother, Ernest LaPrade (1889-1969), who also conducted for the Orchestra of the Nation series.

Three Sax Rohmer serials from the magazine were broadcast, each in 12 weekly parts: The Day the World Ended aired on Wednesdays from May 1, 1929 to July 17, 1929. Daughter of Fu Manchu was heard on Sundays from March 9, 1930 to May 25. 1930 with Arthur Hughes as Dr. Fu Manchu. Sax Rohmer introduced Yu'an Hee See Laughs, serialized on Sundays from March 1, 1931 to May 17, 1931.

In 1929, the format was altered and The Collier Hour became a variety show, offering music, news, sports and comedy in addition to the dramatizations. Helen Hayes appeared on the show October 5, 1930. Guests on the series included George M. Cohan (in his radio debut), John D. Rockefeller, Franklin D. Roosevelt, and Helen Keller.

When Robert Ripley's 1930 debut on The Collier Hour brought a strong listener reaction, he was given a Monday night NBC series beginning April 14, 1930, followed by a 1931–32 series airing twice a week.

== Personnel ==
William Adams played Uncle Henry, 1926–32.
