= Irene McFarland =

American aviator

Irene McFarland was an American aviator and the first woman to join the Caterpillar Club for having made a safe landing using a parachute in 1925.

== See also ==
- Fay Gillis Wells
