= A. Arnold Gillespie =

American cinema special effects artist (1899–1978)

- Born: Albert Arnold Gillespie; October 14, 1899; El Paso, Texas, US
- Died: May 3, 1978 (aged 78); Los Angeles, California, US
- Other name: Buddy Gillespie
- Occupations: Special effects artist, set designer
- Years active: 1926–1965
- Spouses: Ruth Elder (m. 1933; div. 1944), 1 son Nell Hill (1944-unknown), 1 son: Dora Ingram (unknown-1973)
- Children: 2
- Awards: Academy Award for Best Visual Effects; 1944 Thirty Seconds Over Tokyo; 1947 Green Dolphin Street; 1959 Ben-Hur; Academy Award for Technical Achievement; 1964

Albert Arnold "Buddy" Gillespie (October 14, 1899 – May 3, 1978) was an American cinema special effects artist.

== Biography ==
He was born on October 14, 1899, in El Paso, Texas. Gillespie joined MGM as a set designer in 1925, a year after it was founded. He was educated at Columbia University and the Arts Students League. His first project was the silent film Ben-Hur: A Tale of the Christ, released that same year. He worked at the studio in various capacities until 1962. In 1936, he became the head of MGM's Special Effects Department.

He died on May 3, 1978, in Los Angeles, California.

== Legacy ==
He wrote a book, The Wizard of MGM: Memoirs of A. Arnold Gillespie. Gillispie's nickname was "Buddy."

== Academy Award wins and nominations ==
Wins shown in bold

- Special Effects 1939: The Wizard of Oz – Photographic
- Special Effects 1940: Boom Town – Photographic
- Special Effects 1941: Flight Command – Photographic
- Special Effects 1942: Mrs. Miniver – Photographic (with Warren Newcombe)
- Special Effects 1943: Stand By For Action – Photographic (with Donald Jahraus)
- Special Effects 1944: **Thirty Seconds Over Tokyo** – Photographic (with Donald Jahraus and Warren Newcombe)
- Special Effects 1945: They Were Expendable – Photographic (with Donald Jahraus and R. A. MacDonald)
- Special Effects 1947: **Green Dolphin Street** – Visual (with Warren Newcombe)
- Special Effects 1956: Forbidden Planet
- Special Effects 1958: Torpedo Run – Special Effects (Visual)
- Special Effects 1959: **Ben-Hur** – Special Effects (Visual) (with Robert A. MacDonald)
- Special Effects 1962: Mutiny On The Bounty – Special Effects (Visual)
- Scientific or Technical (Class III) 1963: For the engineering of an improved Background Process Projection System (with Douglas Shearer)

== Personal life ==
Gillespie married Nell Hill in 1944. She died in 2000. They had one child, Thomas Scott Gillespie (1944–61). A. Arnold was previously married to aviator Ruth Elder, with whom he had a son, William Trent Gillespie (1940–2008).

== Partial filmography for special effects ==
Inasmuch as he worked on numerous films (IMDb credits him with 203), only some of the better known ones and ones involving prominent special effects are listed below.

- Ben-Hur (1925)
- London After Midnight (1927)
- Night Flight (1933) (uncredited)
- San Francisco (1936) (uncredited)
- Test Pilot (1938)
- The Wizard of Oz (1939)
- Boom Town (1940)
- Comrade X (1940)
- Flight Command (1940)
- Mrs. Miniver (1942)
- Stand By For Action (1943)
- A Guy Named Joe (1943)
- Song of Russia (1944)
- The Heavenly Body (1944)
- The White Cliffs of Dover (1944)
- Mrs. Parkington (1944)
- Thirty Seconds Over Tokyo (1944)
- The Clock (1945)
- They Were Expendable (1945)
- Lady in the Lake (1947)
- The Beginning or the End (1947)
- The Sea of Grass (1947)
- The Hucksters (1947)
- Green Dolphin Street (1947)
- State of the Union (1948)
- Command Decision (1948)
- The Secret Garden (1949)
- Adam's Rib (1949)
- Annie Get Your Gun (1950)
- Kim (1950)
- Angels in the Outfield (1951)
- Quo Vadis (1951)
- Scaramouche (1952)
- Plymouth Adventure (1952)
- Million Dollar Mermaid (1952)
- The Bad and the Beautiful (1952)
- Young Bess (1953)
- Seven Brides for Seven Brothers (1954)
- Forbidden Planet (1956)
- High Society (1956)
- Jailhouse Rock (1957)
- Torpedo Run (1958)
- North by Northwest (1959)
- The Wreck of the Mary Deare (1959)
- Ben-Hur (1959)
- Atlantis, the Lost Continent (1961)
- How the West Was Won (1962)
- Mutiny On The Bounty (1962)
- The Unsinkable Molly Brown (1964)
- The Greatest Story Ever Told (1965)
