= Moran of the Marines =

1928 film

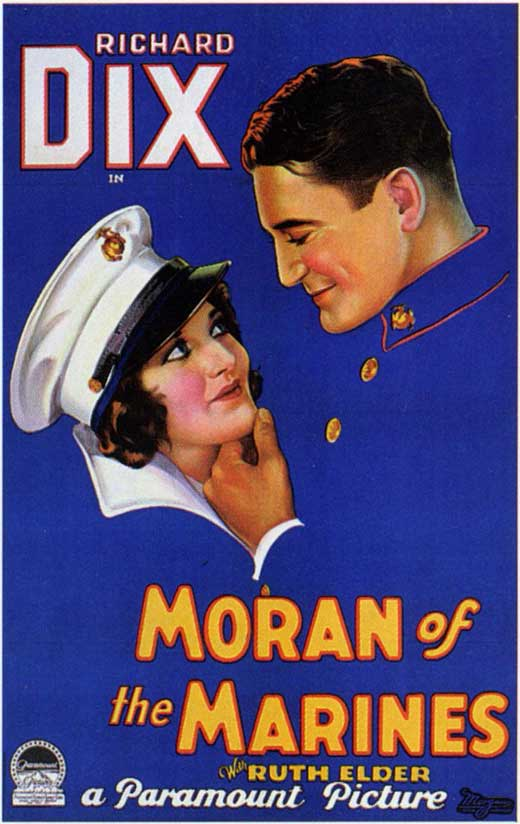
- Theatrical release poster
- Directed by: Frank R. Strayer
- Screenplay by: Ray Harris; Agnes Brand Leahy; George Marion Jr. Sam Mintz; Linton Wells
- Produced by: Jesse L. Lasky; Adolph Zukor
- Starring: Richard Dix; Ruth Elder; Roscoe Karns; Brooks Benedict; E. H. Calvert; Duke Martin
- Cinematography: Edward Cronjager
- Edited by: Otho Lovering
- Production company: Paramount Pictures
- Distributed by: Paramount Pictures
- Release date: October 13, 1928
- Running time: 70 minutes
- Country: United States
- Language: Silent..English intertitles

Moran of the Marines is a lost 1928 American comedy silent film directed by Frank R. Strayer and written by Ray Harris, Agnes Brand Leahy, George Marion Jr., Sam Mintz and Linton Wells. The film stars Richard Dix, Ruth Elder, Roscoe Karns, Brooks Benedict, E. H. Calvert and Duke Martin. The film was released on October 13, 1928, by Paramount Pictures.

== Cast ==
- Richard Dix as Michael Moran
- Ruth Elder as Vivian Marshall
- Roscoe Karns as Swatty
- Brooks Benedict as Basil Worth
- E. H. Calvert as Gen. Marshall
- Duke Martin as The Sergeant
- Tetsu Komai as Sun Yat
