= Boom Town (film) =

1940 American Western film

- Theatrical release poster
- Directed by: Jack Conway
- Written by: John Lee Mahin
- Based on: "A Lady Comes to Burkburnett"; 1939 story in Cosmopolitan by James Edward Grant
- Produced by: Sam Zimbalist
- Starring: Clark Gable; Spencer Tracy; Claudette Colbert; Hedy Lamarr
- Cinematography: Harold Rosson; Elwood Bredell (uncredited)
- Edited by: Blanche Sewell; Paul Landres (uncredited)
- Music by: Franz Waxman
- Production company: Metro-Goldwyn-Mayer
- Distributed by: Loew's Inc.
- Release date: August 30, 1940
- Running time: 119 minutes
- Country: United States
- Language: English
- Budget: $1.6 million
- Box office: $5 million

Boom Town is a 1940 American Neo-western film starring Clark Gable, Spencer Tracy, Claudette Colbert, and Hedy Lamarr, and directed by Jack Conway. The supporting cast features Frank Morgan, Lionel Atwill, and Chill Wills. A story written by James Edward Grant in Cosmopolitan magazine entitled "A Lady Comes to Burkburnett" provided the inspiration for the film. The film was produced and released by Metro-Goldwyn-Mayer.

== Plot ==
"Big John" McMasters and "Square John"/"Shorty" Sand are two down-on-their-luck oil wildcatters who join forces. Without enough money, they steal drilling equipment from a skeptical Luther Aldrich. Their well proves a bust and they have to hastily depart when Aldrich shows up with the sheriff to take back his property. The two oilmen team up and make enough money to partially pay Aldrich. To get him to back them for a second try, they cut him in for a percentage of the well. This time, they strike it rich.

When Elizabeth "Betsy" Bartlett shows up, McMasters sweeps her off her feet (without knowing that Sand considers her his girl) and marries her. Sand accepts the situation, wanting Betsy to be happy. However, on their first anniversary, she catches her husband dancing with a barroom floozy. As a result, Sand quarrels with McMasters and they flip a coin for the entire oilfield. Betsy leaves her husband, but returns when she learns that he has lost almost everything to Sand and needs her.

Each man goes through booms and busts. Building on his renewed success as a wildcatter, McMasters moves to New York to expand into refineries and distribution, competing against former customer Harry Compton. Seeking inside information about his rivals, he hires away Compton's adviser Karen Vanmeer, who uses her social contacts and womanly charms to gather industry information.

Meanwhile, Sand loses everything he has built up in South America to a revolution. When he meets McMasters at an oilmen's convention, the two finally reconcile, and Sand goes to work for his old friend. When he suspects that McMasters is carrying on an affair with Karen, he tries to save Betsy's marriage by offering to marry Karen. However, she deduces his motives and declines. When a miserable Betsy tries to commit suicide by taking sleeping pills, Sand decides that the only way to help her is to bankrupt McMasters. Sand loses his costly battle with his former friend and goes broke. It is only when he asks McMasters to give his wife a divorce that the married man finally comes to his senses. Later, McMasters is prosecuted by the government for violating the Sherman Antitrust Act and loses his business. In the end, poor, but happier, Sand and McMasters team up again, with the blissful Betsy looking on. Aldrich supplies them with equipment and the whole cycle begins again.

== Cast ==
- Clark Gable as "Big John" McMasters
- Spencer Tracy as "Square John" Sand
- Claudette Colbert as Betsy Bartlett McMasters
- Hedy Lamarr as Karen Vanmeer
- Frank Morgan as Luther Aldrich
- Lionel Atwill as Harry Compton
- Chill Wills as Deputy Harmony Jones
- Marion Martin as Whitey
- Minna Gombell as Evie
- Joe Yule as Ed Murphy
- Horace Murphy as Tom Murphy
- Roy Gordon as "Mac" McCreery
- Richard Lane as Assistant District Attorney
- Casey Johnson as Jack McMasters as a child
- Baby Quintanilla as Jack McMasters as a baby
- George Lessey as Judge
- Sara Haden as Miss Barnes
- Frank Orth as Barber
- Frank McGlynn Sr. as Deacon
- Curt Bois as Ferdie
- Howard Hickman as McCreery's associate #1 (uncredited)

Cast notes:

- Gable's father, William Gable, was an oil-well driller, and as a teenager, Gable himself worked for his father in Oklahoma, so he was familiar with the subject of this film.

== Production ==
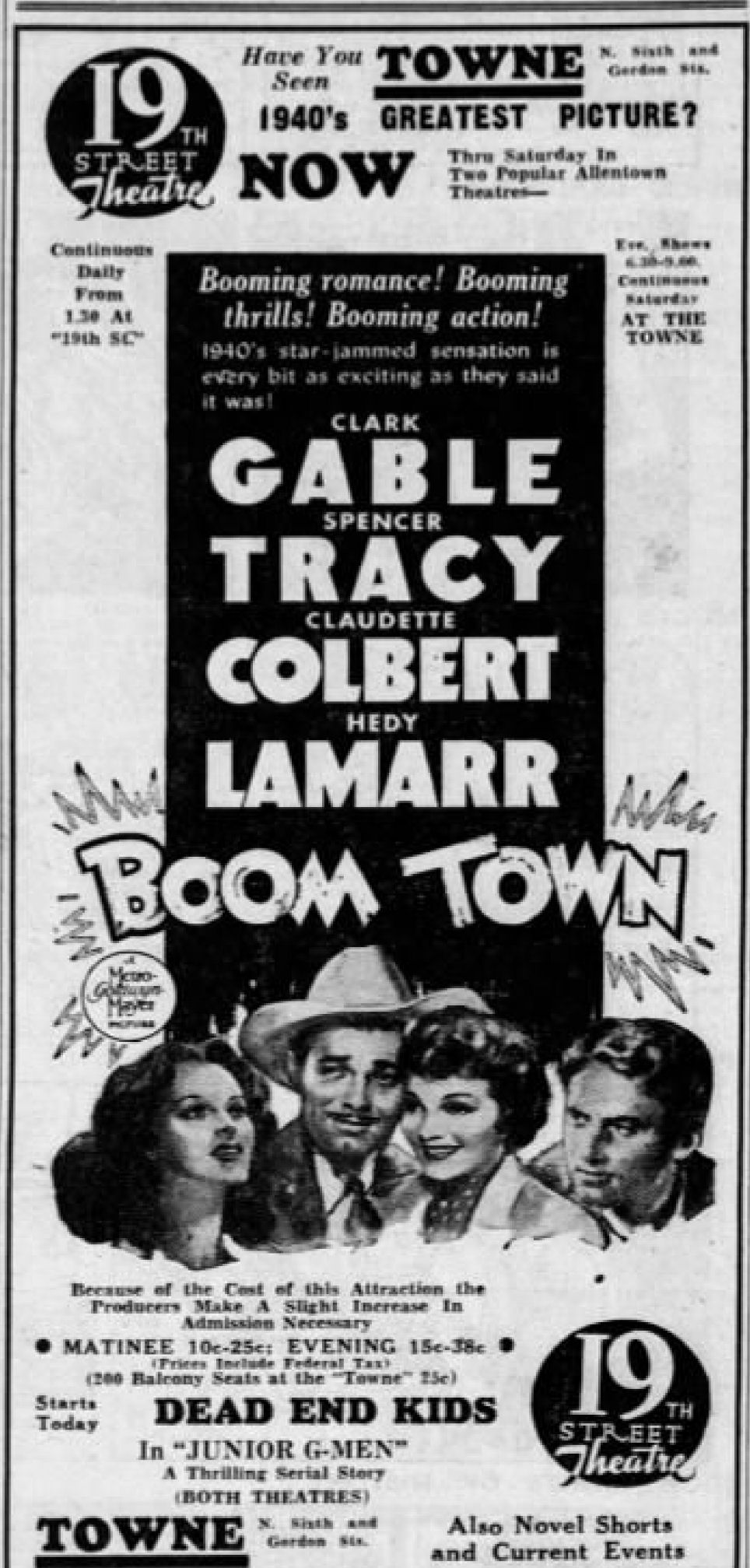
1940 newspaper ad for the film

MGM had been looking for a project set in the oil fields as a vehicle for Clark Gable for some time. They optioned the short story "The Lady Comes to Burkburnett" in November 1938.

The actress originally considered for the female lead role was Myrna Loy, for whom the part was written. Instead, this became the second, and last, pairing of Colbert and Gable, who had starred together in It Happened One Night. Gable and Spencer Tracy had also worked together before, in two other films, San Francisco and Test Pilot. Eventually Tracy insisted on the same top billing clause in his MGM contract that Gable enjoyed, effectively ending the pairing, though Tracy and Gable liked each other personally and enjoyed working together.

The movie was the first Gable made under a new seven-year contract with MGM. Tracy, in fact, brooded over his second-billing status during the filming of Boom Town and was reportedly unpleasant to deal with. He especially did not get along with either of the female leads.

Some of the location shooting for the film took place in South Belridge, California.

== Reception ==
=== Critical ===
Bosley Crowther of The New York Times praised the scenes involving the oil wells as exciting but found the human part of the story "peters out into repetitious wrangling along monotonous lines." Variety's review was positive, writing: "Unlike many large-budgeted productions carrying multistar setups that tend either to costume background or sophistication for limited appeal, this one breaks out with a dashing, rough-and-tumble yarn of modern adventure that carries all elements for widest audience appeal ... story is repetitious in its cutbacks to new oil fields and gushers, but this fact will be considered unimportant by the customers." Harrison's Reports accurately predicted that the film's star power would make it a big hit, but said the story was "only fairly good" and the plot "somewhat thin."

Film Daily called the screenplay "excellent" and wrote that Conway "has furnished an outstanding job of directing, blending the action, love interest and comedy so that interest is held to the end." John Mosher wrote a mixed review for The New Yorker, stating that "when the plot leaves the West and comes East, it grows rather feeble. Western bars, these boom towns and their peculiar architecture and their customs, and the spectacle of the great oil gushers themselves form a substantial background of interest, I should say, which a commonplace plot merely frames."

It ranked seventh on Film Daily's year-end nationwide poll of 546 critics of the 10 Best Films of 1940.

=== Box office ===
Boom Town was a box office success upon its release, becoming the highest-grossing film of the year. According to MGM records the film earned $3,664,000 in the US and Canada and $1,365,000 elsewhere, resulting in an estimated profit of $1,892,000.

== Awards and honors ==
Harold Rosson was nominated for the Academy Award for Best Cinematography (Black-and-White), and A. Arnold Gillespie (photographic effects) and Douglas Shearer (sound effects) were nominated for Best Special Effects.
