= John B. Kennedy (journalist) =

American radio presenter (1894–1961)

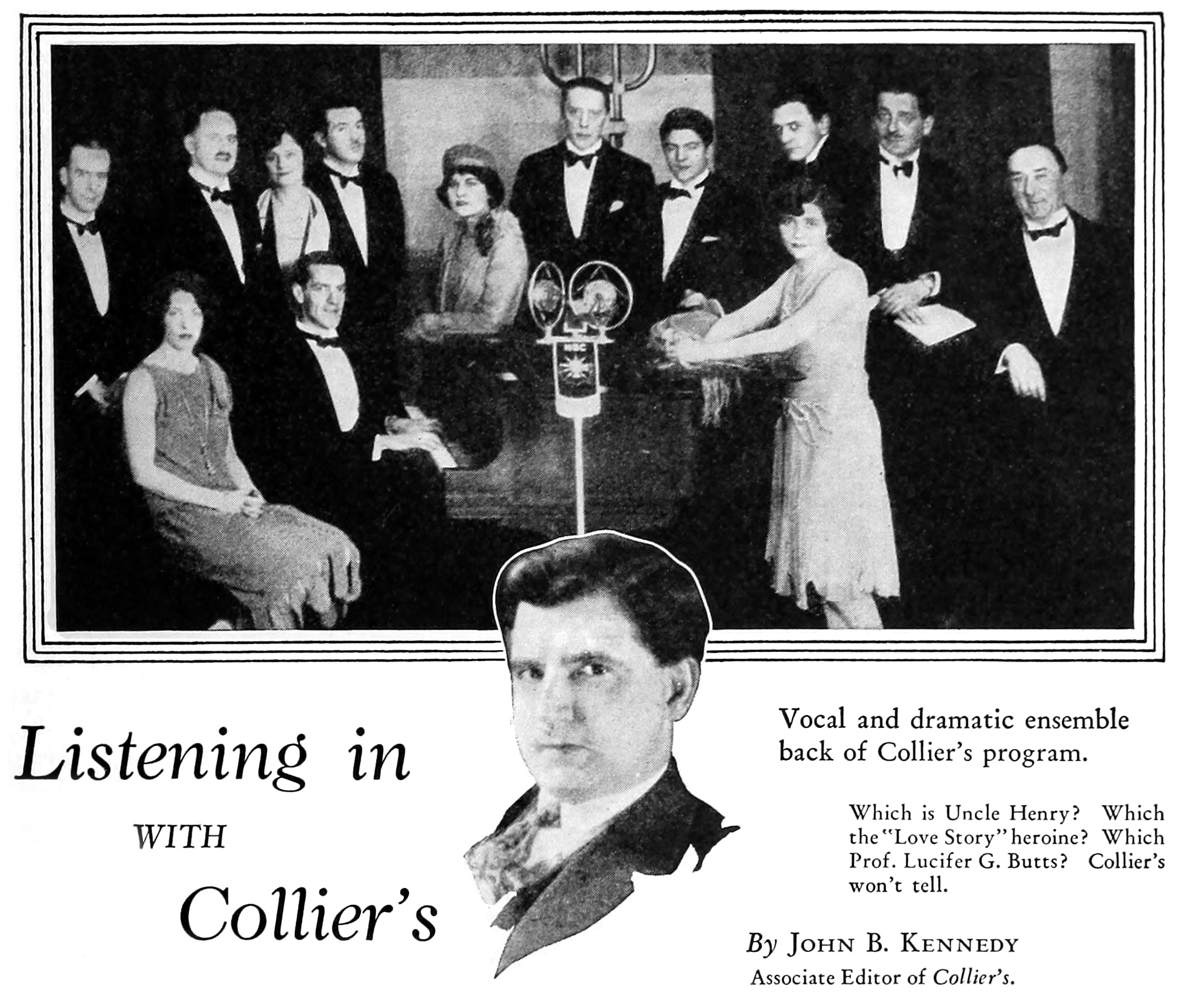
The uncredited ensemble presenting The Collier Hour in a feature story by John B. Kennedy, associate editor of Collier's (1930)

John Bright Kennedy (16 January 1894 – 1961) was an American radio correspondent, journalist, and film narrator.

== Biography ==
John B. Kennedy was born in Quebec City, Quebec, of a French Canadian mother and an Irish engineer father. His work included a commentator on the program The Magic Key of RCA which ran from 1934 to 1939. He often hosted The People’s Rally, an influential current affairs program that featured prominent spokespersons for both pro and con arguments of the day.

His first radio stint took place in 1924, on WJZ, when he was 30 and associate editor of Collier's. In 1925 Collier's installed him on The Collier Hour that continued until 1931. After the show went off the air, NBC hired Kennedy as a staff commentator and host of The Magic Key of RCA and The People’s Rally.

Kennedy has a star on the Hollywood Walk of Fame.
