= The Winged Horseman =

1929 film

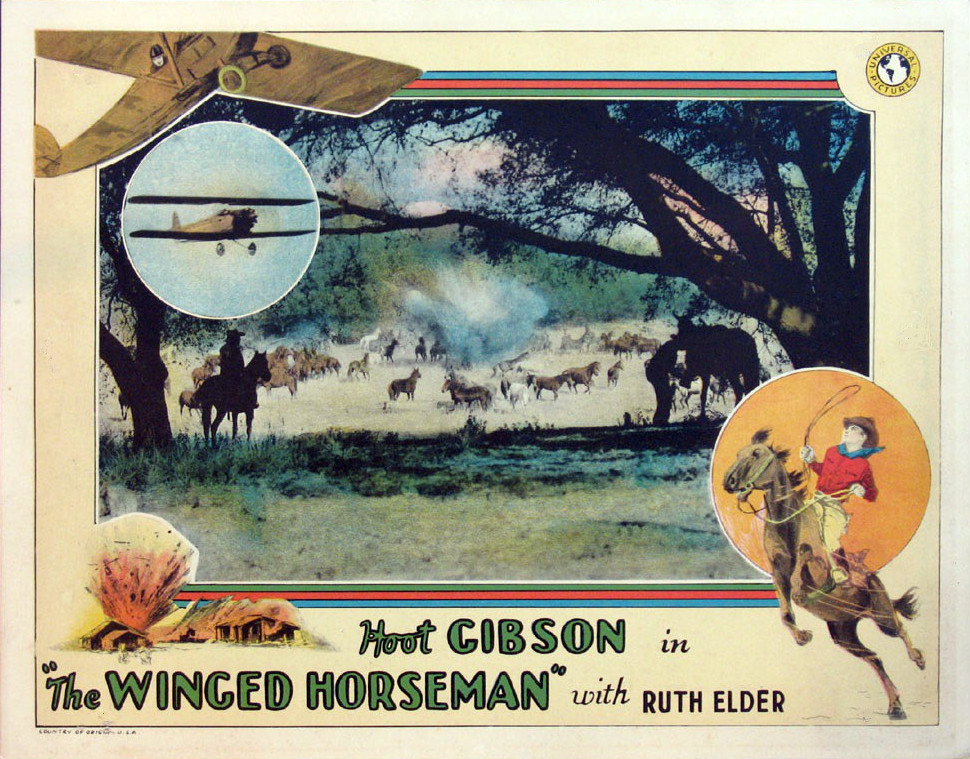
- Lobby card
- Directed by: B. Reeves Eason; Arthur Rosson
- Written by: Raymond L Schrock (story & screenplay); Harold Tarshis (intertitles)
- Produced by: Carl Laemmle
- Starring: Hoot Gibson; Ruth Elder
- Cinematography: Harry Neumann
- Edited by: Gilmore Walker
- Distributed by: Universal Pictures
- Release date: May 24, 1929
- Running time: 60 minutes
- Country: United States
- Languages: Silent; English intertitles

The Winged Horseman is a lost 1929 American silent Western film directed by B. Reeves Eason and Arthur Rosson and starring Hoot Gibson and aviator Ruth Elder. It was produced and released by Universal Pictures.

== Cast ==
- Hoot Gibson as Skyball Smith
- Ruth Elder as Joby Hobson
- Charles Schaeffer as Colonel Hobson
- Allan Forrest as Curly Davis
- Herbert Prior as Eben Matthews

== Production ==
A portion of the film was shot at King City, California.

A stunt woman, Leta Belle Wichart, died when her parachute failed to open during a scene standing in for Ruth Elder.
