= Humanitarian Action =

Humanitarian Action (Russian: Гуманитарное действие) is a non-governmental charitable organization based in St. Petersburg, Russia. Humanitarian Action carries out programs and outreach for HIV/AIDS prevention, and aiding street children, intravenous drug users, and sex workers. The program, founded in June 2001, grew out of the French NGO Doctors of the World, which created medical-social programs in Russia starting in 1995.

== Mission and Philosophy ==
Humanitarian Action works to slow the spread of HIV infection and other socially important diseases, maintaining the accessibility of medical, social and psychological treatment, and help HIV positive people, abandoned children, intravenous drug users and sex workers reintegrate with society, as well as aiding those at risk for violence, trafficking and discrimination.

Humanitarian Action is founded on a principle of accessibility, making sure that at-risk groups can use governmental and non-governmental public services and working to resolve social problems. Much of their work is directed towards the acknowledgement and protection of at-risk individuals' human rights.

== Programs ==
Humanitarian Action carries out several aid programs simultaneously, each with specific goals and methods.

Children of the Streets of Saint Petersburg (Russian:"Дети улиц Санкт-Петербурга") works to reduce the spread of HIV/AIDS and other diseases in street children and homeless or neglected teenagers, and provide them with health, social and psychological aid. Provides outreach in the form of counseling, information about resources and AIDS prevention, and age appropriate educational materials. This program also provides caseworkers on an individual basis and a mobile school that offers tutoring in small groups.

Prevention of HIV/AIDS and other socially important diseases among intravenous drug users (Russian:"Профилактика ВИЧ/СПИД и других социально значимых заболеваний среди потребителей инъекционных наркотиков") works to curb the spread of HIV, hepatitis and other diseases among intravenous drug users. This program uses mobile outreach (on buses) to make contact with drug users and distribute informational materials, provide testing for HIV, hepatitis, and other diseases, and provide sterile needles and water for injections, as well as properly disposing of used needles. The outreach also works to prevent violence and provide social, psychological and medical counseling, referrals to health care specialists, and legal information.

Prevention of HIV, STIs and other diseases in women of vulnerable social groups (Russian:"Комплексная профилактика ВИЧ-инфекции, ИППП и других социально-значимых заболеваний среди женщин из особо уязвимых групп") provides means of AIDS prevention to sex workers, as well as temporary lodging for pregnant women and vulnerable women with children. This program also offers an informational hotline for vulnerable women, offering advice on disease prevention in sex work and drug use environments, and a network of allied health and legal professionals.

Access to medical services for intravenous drug users and sex workers (Russian:"Обеспечение доступа к медицинским услугам для потребителей инъекционных наркотиков и лиц, вовлечённых в сферу оказания сексуальных услуг") is a program run in tandem with the St. Petersburg Infectious Diseases Hospital in the Name of S. P. Botkin. It provides access to medical services for drug users and sex workers and HIV and STI prevention. Services include counseling for pregnant HIV-positive women, support for those living with HIV, referrals among a trusted network of doctors, disease testing, needle exchange, an HIV hotline, and the distribution of informational materials and condoms.

Medical/Social support (Russian:"Служба медико-социального сопровождения") is a program that works to increase health and quality of life for those infected with HIV/AIDS. This is a case-management project that provides individual psychological, medical, and social aid, and provides counseling and consultation both for HIV-positive people and their families. This program also strives to develop cooperation among different nongovernmental organizations that provide aid for vulnerable social groups.

The Learning Center (Russian:"Учебный центр") shares experiences and methods for preventing HIV and other diseases and helps other organizations coordinate and create their own programs to protect vulnerable groups. This program provides training, seminars, round table meetings and master classes on relevant topics, as well as conducting focus groups and creating informational materials for distribution.

== Awards ==
In 2005, Humanitarian Action received the Award for Action on HIV/AIDS and Human Rights, which is given annually by the Human Rights Watch and the Canadian HIV/AIDS Legal Network.
