= International Forest of Friendship =

Arboretum and memorial forest in Atchison, Kansas, United States

Coordinates: 39.5324°N 95.1491°W

- Interactive map of International Forest of Friendship
- Website: Official website

The International Forest of Friendship is an arboretum and memorial forest beside Lake Warnock in Atchison, Kansas. It is a memorial to the men and women involved in aviation and space exploration, and open to the public daily.

The forest was started in 1976 by the city of Atchison and the Ninety-Nines, an international organization of women pilots. Fay Gillis Wells is credited as founder and original co-chairman. The forest contains trees representing all 50 American states and the 35 countries where honorees reside. Each tree has its own flag, and many have unique associations, including trees from George Washington's Mount Vernon, the Bicentennial American Spruce, a tree from Amelia Earhart's grandfather's farm, a redbud from President Dwight D. Eisenhower's farm, and an American sycamore grown from a seed taken to the Moon by Command Module pilot Stuart Roosa on Apollo 14. The Moon tree is dedicated to seventeen American astronauts who died furthering space exploration.

A trail through the forest contains granite plaques with the names of over 1,200 aviation notables, including Amelia Earhart, Charles Lindbergh, Jeana Yeager, Rajiv Gandhi, the Wright Brothers, Sally Ride, Chuck Yeager, Beryl Markham, Jerrie Cobb, Stephania Wojtulanis-Karpińska, General Jimmy Doolittle, President George H. W. Bush, General Colin Powell, and Lt. Col. Eileen M. Collins, Capt. Lynn Rippelmeyer

== See also ==
- List of botanical gardens in the United States
