= Ruth Elder =

American pilot and actress

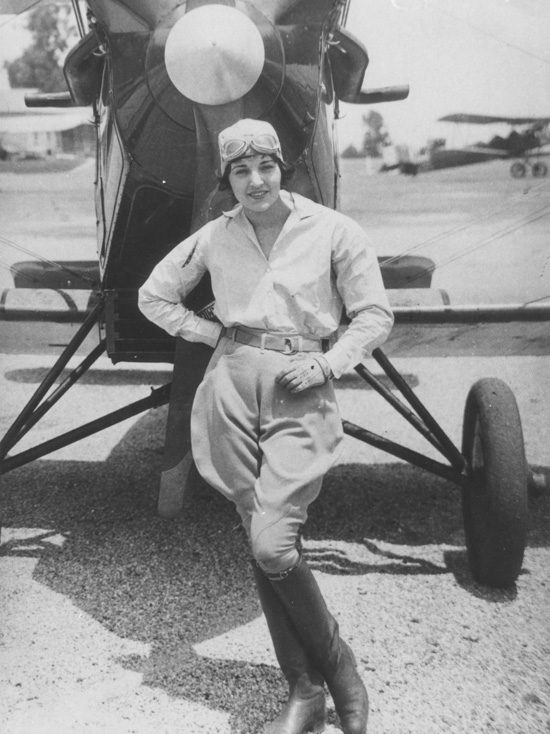
- Born: September 8, 1902; Anniston, Alabama, U.S.
- Died: October 9, 1977 (aged 75); San Francisco, California, U.S.
- Known for: Early aviation records, including first woman to attempt transatlantic flight; film star
- Spouses: C.E. Moody (m. 1920–1922) (est.); Lyle Womack (m. 1925–1928); Walter Camp Jr. (m. 1929–1932); G.K. Thackery (m. 1932–1932) (est.); A. Arnold Gillespie (m. 1933–1944); Ralph P. King (m. 1945–1953) (est.); (m. 1956)
- Children: 1
- Website: www.ctie.monash.edu.au/hargrave/elder.html

Ruth Elder (September 8, 1902 – October 9, 1977) was an aviation pioneer and actress. She carried private pilot certificate P675, and was known as the "Miss America of Aviation." She was a charter member of the Ninety-Nines.

In October 1927 she took off from New York in the Stinson Detroiter American Girl, with George Haldeman as pilot, in an attempt to become the first woman transatlantic airplane flyer. Mechanical problems caused them to ditch the plane 360 miles from the Azores, but they established a new over-water endurance flight record of 2,623 miles. It was also at the time the longest flight ever made by a woman. Rescued by a ship, she and George were honored with a ticker-tape parade upon their return.

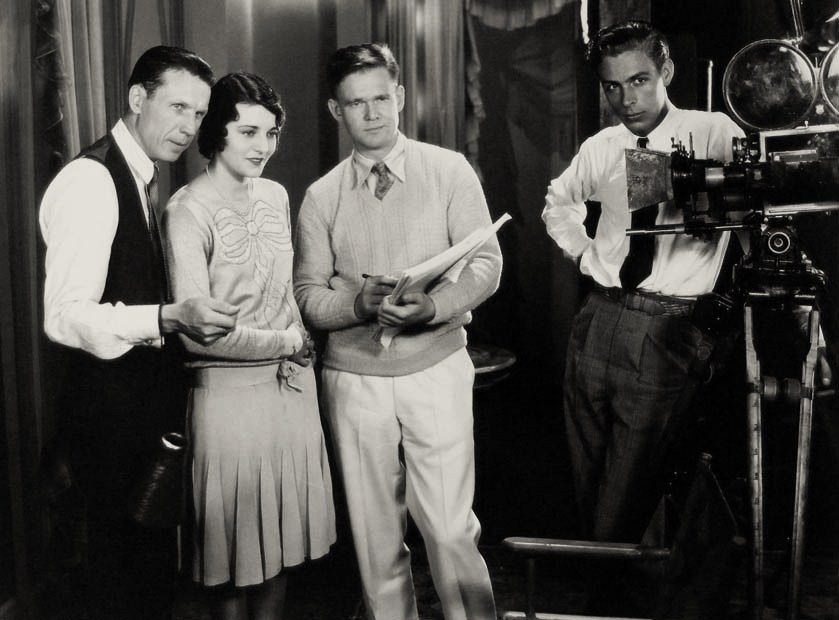
Ruth Elder in Moran of the Marines (1928)

After her flight, she embarked on a series of lucrative speaking engagements and was given a movie contract. She starred in Moran of the Marines (1928) and The Winged Horseman (1929).

In 1929 she entered the first Women's Air Derby, flying in her Swallow, NC8730, and placed fifth.

She married six times. She married Walter Camp, Jr., son of the early football innovator, on August 29, 1929, but filed for divorce in Reno, Nevada, on November 14, 1932. Her final union was a remarriage to Ralph P. King, to whom she was married for 21 years and who outlived her. She had suffered emphysema for several years before she died. She had one son, William Trent Gillespie (1940-2008), from her marriage to movie effects pioneer A. Arnold Gillespie.

She appears on the May 29, 1952 edition of You Bet Your Life under the name of Ruth King, where she mentions that she is writing her autobiography.

She worked as an executive secretary in the aviation industry in her later career, hired by Howard Hughes who had initially forgotten who she was.

In 2013, an inspirational juvenile book titled Flying Solo: How Ruth Elder Soared into America's Heart was published, written by Julie Cummins and illustrated by Malene R. Laugesen. The title character of the Ruth Darrow Flying Stories book series is said be based on Ruth Elder. In 2016, her story was told in novelized version in Crossing the Horizon by Laurie Notaro.
