= The Magic Key of RCA =

American variety radio show

The Magic Key of RCA was an American variety radio show that featured an unusually large and broad range of entertainment stars and other noted personalities. It was on the NBC Blue Network from September 29, 1935, until September 18, 1939.

It was hosted by announcers Milton Cross and Ben Grauer, with a house orchestra directed by Frank Black through 1938 and Nathaniel Shilkret in 1939.

In his Encyclopedia of American Radio, Luther Sies writes that, "NBC used this quality program to demonstrate the cultural contribution radio could make", and notes that performers included Ruth Etting, Fibber McGee and Molly, John B. Kennedy, Rudolf Ganz, Casper Beardon, Paul Robeson, Eddie Green, Jane Froman, Doris Weston, Frank Forrest, Paul Taylor Chorus, Margaret Brill, Rudy Vallée, Irving Berlin, Darryl Zanuck, Jan Peerce, Tommy Dorsey, Artie Shaw, Jack Harris, Ann Jameson, Sonja Henie, Tyrone Power, Walter Abel, Whitney Bern and George Shelley. There were also appearances by Amos 'n' Andy, Lum and Abner, Paul Whiteman, Efrem Zimbalist, Ignacy Jan Paderewski, Eleanor Roosevelt, Vienna Boys' Choir, Benny Goodman, Gladys Swarthout, Ray Noble, Guy Lombardo, Richard Himber, Eugene Ormandy, Lauritz Melchior, Fred MacMurray, Walt Disney and the Pickens Sisters, and the breadth of the show included short dramas, a male quartet from Stockholm, jazz from Chicago, an account of Benito Mussolini's campaign in Africa and a conversation with a crew of a submerged submarine.

A typical show in 1939 began with an opening number by Shilkret, followed by a comedy skit by Stoopnagle and Budd.

The complete set of broadcasts is available for listening at the Library of Congress.
