= Yuricich =

Yuricich is a surname. Notable people with the surname include:

- Matthew Yuricich (1923–2012), American special effects artist
- Richard Yuricich (born 1942), American special effects artist, brother of Matthew
