= Greg Jein =

Chinese American model designer (1945–2022)

- Born: Gregory Jein; 31 October 1945; Los Angeles, California, U.S.
- Died: 22 May 2022 (aged 76); Los Angeles, California, U.S.
- Known for: Close Encounters of the Third Kind, Star Trek

Greg Jein (October 31, 1945, in Los Angeles, US – May 22, 2022, in Los Angeles) was a Chinese American model designer who created miniatures for use in the special effects portions of many films and television series, beginning in the 1970s. Jein was nominated for an Academy Award for Best Visual Effects for his work on the films Close Encounters of the Third Kind (1977) and 1941 (1979), and also nominated for an Outstanding Special Visual Effects Emmy for his work on Angels in America.

Jein was a graduate of Dorsey High School in the Crenshaw district of Los Angeles, and of California State University, Los Angeles.

== Biography ==
One of Jein's first jobs was building models for the sex comedy spoof Flesh Gordon; this was followed by work on a number of television series, commercials and movies including Wonder Woman and The UFO Incident. In 1975 he was contacted by Douglas Trumbull's office and asked to do some work on Steven Spielberg's Close Encounters of the Third Kind. For that film Jein contributed a number of models including miniature landscapes for UFOs to fly over, but most significantly he and his crew built the detailed mothership model that features heavily in the final sequence of the film after Spielberg decided he wanted "a more flamboyant design". For their work Jein, Trumbull, Roy Arbogast, Matthew Yuricich, and Richard Yuricich were nominated for an Academy Award for Best Visual Effects at the 50th Academy Awards, but lost to the team who produced the effects for Star Wars. Jein then went on to work on Spielberg's next film, 1941, where he and his team constructed a number of models including a twelve-foot model of the Ferris wheel that's dislodged from its mount and rolls down the pier and into the water. For their work on 1941 Jein, William A. Fraker and A. D. Flowers were nominated for an Academy Award for Best Visual Effects at the 52nd Academy Awards but lost this time to the team who provided the effects for Ridley Scott's Alien.

After working on 1941, Jein was invited by Douglas Trumbull to work on Star Trek: The Motion Picture building planetary models for Spock's spacewalk scene and the interior of the V'Ger craft. Jein continued his association with Star Trek through a number of the movies, building alien weapons for Star Trek V: The Final Frontier, and Starfleet helmets for the assassination scene in Star Trek VI: The Undiscovered Country. In 1986 he and a team at Industrial Light & Magic built the original six-foot model of the USS Enterprise (NCC-1701-D) designed by Andrew Probert for the pilot of Star Trek: The Next Generation. He would go on to build a number of models for The Next Generation including the Ferengi Marauder starship (also designed by Andrew Probert) during the first season of the show, and the Klingon Vor'cha (designed by Rick Sternbach) for the fourth season.
