= Roy Arbogast =

American special effects artist (born 1941)

- Born: Roy Howard Arbogast; September 5, 1941 (age 84); Hill County, Montana, U.S.
- Occupation: Special effects artist

Roy Howard Arbogast (born September 5, 1941) is an American special effects artist. He was nominated for an Academy Award in the category Best Visual Effects for the film Close Encounters of the Third Kind.

== Selected filmography ==
- Close Encounters of the Third Kind (1977; co-nominated with Douglas Trumbull, Matthew Yuricich, Greg Jein and Richard Yuricich)
