= Brainstorm (1983 film) =

1983 film by Douglas Trumbull

- Theatrical release poster
- Directed by: Douglas Trumbull
- Screenplay by: Philip Frank Messina; Robert Stitzel
- Story by: Bruce Joel Rubin
- Produced by: Douglas Trumbull
- Starring: Christopher Walken; Natalie Wood; Louise Fletcher; Cliff Robertson
- Cinematography: Richard Yuricich
- Edited by: Freeman A. Davies; Edward Warschilka
- Music by: James Horner
- Production company: Metro-Goldwyn-Mayer
- Distributed by: MGM/UA Entertainment Company
- Release date: September 30, 1983
- Running time: 106 minutes
- Country: United States
- Language: English
- Budget: $18 million

Brainstorm is a 1983 American science fiction film directed by Douglas Trumbull, and starring Christopher Walken, Natalie Wood (in her final film role), Louise Fletcher, and Cliff Robertson.

It follows a research team's efforts to perfect a system that records and replays its users' sensory experiences and emotions, and the efforts by the company's management to exploit the device for military ends. After a researcher records her own death from a heart attack, her colleagues join forces to retrieve the information and play it back.

== Plot ==
Scientists invent a brain–computer interface that records sensations from a person's brain on tape for others to experience. The team includes estranged husband and wife Michael and Karen, as well as Michael's colleague Lillian. At CEO Alex's instruction, the team demonstrates the device to investors to gain financing.

Karen dons the recorder while working with Michael and Lillian. When Michael plays the tape back, the group realizes that emotional experiences are also recorded. Michael tapes his memories of times with Karen, which he shares with her, leading to their reconciliation.

Alex and his investors pressure Lillian to accept Landan, who works for the federal government and has ties to the military, on the team. Karen vehemently opposes their plan to have the invention developed for military use.

One team member, Gordy, has sexual intercourse while wearing the recorder, and shares the tape with colleagues, including Hal. Hal splices one section of the tape into a continuous orgasm, which results in sensory overload, leading to his forced retirement. Tensions increase as the possibilities for abuse—and not only by the military–industrial complex—become clear.

A chain smoker, Lillian suffers from heart problems. She has a heart attack while working alone. Realizing she is about to die, Lillian records her experience.

Michael decides to play Lillian's recording, but nearly dies when his body relives her heart attack. Michael modifies his console to filter the physical output and replays the tape. He sees "memory bubbles"—moments from Lillian's life. Michael experiences Lillian's memories of a humorous exchange with Michael as he plays with an industrial robot, a surprise birthday party, and being devastated when Alex tells her that an earlier project is canceled.

Landan's men monitor the equipment while Michael plays Lillian's tape. They have Gordy plug in, but Landan ignores the staff's warning that Michael modified his terminal. Gordy dies from experiencing Lillian's heart attack.

Michael's playback is cut short by Hal, but witnessing the near-death experience makes Michael eager to see the entire tape. Alex has the recording locked away and tells Michael he will not be allowed to view it. When he returns to work, Michael walks in on Landan and outside technicians going through his research records. Alex responds to his protests by firing Michael and Karen.

Michael attempts to hack into the lab's computers. Hal advises him to look under "Project Brainstorm", a program the military created to use their invention for torture and brainwashing. Michael accesses a tape from his den and quickly stops viewing it because of its disturbing nature. Michael and Karen's son Chris inadvertently views the tape, causing a psychotic break that requires hospitalization. Alex visits and Michael confronts him about Project Brainstorm, blaming Alex for his son's condition. Alex denies any knowledge of the project, then informs Michael of Gordy's death.

Michael vows to destroy his work and enlists the help of Karen and Hal. Michael and Karen head to the Pinehurst Resort, and realizing they are under surveillance, stage an argument that ends in Karen leaving for Hal's house. As the two feign reconciliation over the phone, Michael accesses the Brainstorm computer via another phone line while Karen hacks into the system, sabotaging the robots that manufacture the interface terminals and causing them to run amok.

Karen shuts down the security system, locking the staff outside. Michael loads Lillian's tape. With the plant in chaos, Brainstorm manager Robert orders Michael's arrest.

Karen leaves to meet with Michael at a place important to them. Hal and his wife, Wendy, send the last of Karen's commands to the company computers, shutting down the plant.

Karen follows Michael to a phone booth at the Wright Brothers memorial. The tape plays. Michael bears witness to the afterlife, experiencing a vision of hell, then traveling from Earth and through the universe, even after the tape ends. He ultimately has visions of angels and departed souls flying into a great cosmic Light. Then he collapses. Karen, believing him dead or dying, screams at him, over and over, demanding that he stay with her. Awakening, weeping with joy, Michael gets up, walks around, then points up and whispers, “Look at the stars!” Their embrace, enclosed in a memory bubble that floats into the night.

== Cast ==
- Christopher Walken as Dr. Michael Brace
- Natalie Wood as Karen Brace
- Louise Fletcher as Dr. Lillian Reynolds
- Cliff Robertson as Alex Terson
- Jordan Christopher as Gordy Forbes
- Donald Hotton as Dr. Landan Marks
- Alan Fudge as Robert Jenkins, project manager for project Brainstorm
- Joe Dorsey as Hal Abramson
- Bill Morey as James Zimbach
- Jason Lively as Chris Brace
- Georgianne Walken as Wendy Abramson

== Production ==
To prepare for the film, Trumbull took most of the key cast and crew to the Esalen Institute, an experimental research facility in northern California known for its new-age classes and workshops. In September 1981, the cast and crew traveled to North Carolina to begin six weeks of shooting at locations including the Elion-Hitchings Building in Research Triangle Park and Duke University, then returned to the Metro-Goldwyn-Mayer Studios in Culver City, California in November to film interior scenes.

Natalie Wood said she was attracted to the film because it was "such an intriguing idea" and further stated that "there is an aspect to the film that deals with the ability to experience things through another person's eyes, to walk in another person's shoes. I think there is a kind of universal curiosity in that, and I don't think that has been dealt with in films."

The film marked Robertson's first credit in a studio film since the David Begelman embezzlement scandal.

=== Natalie Wood's death ===
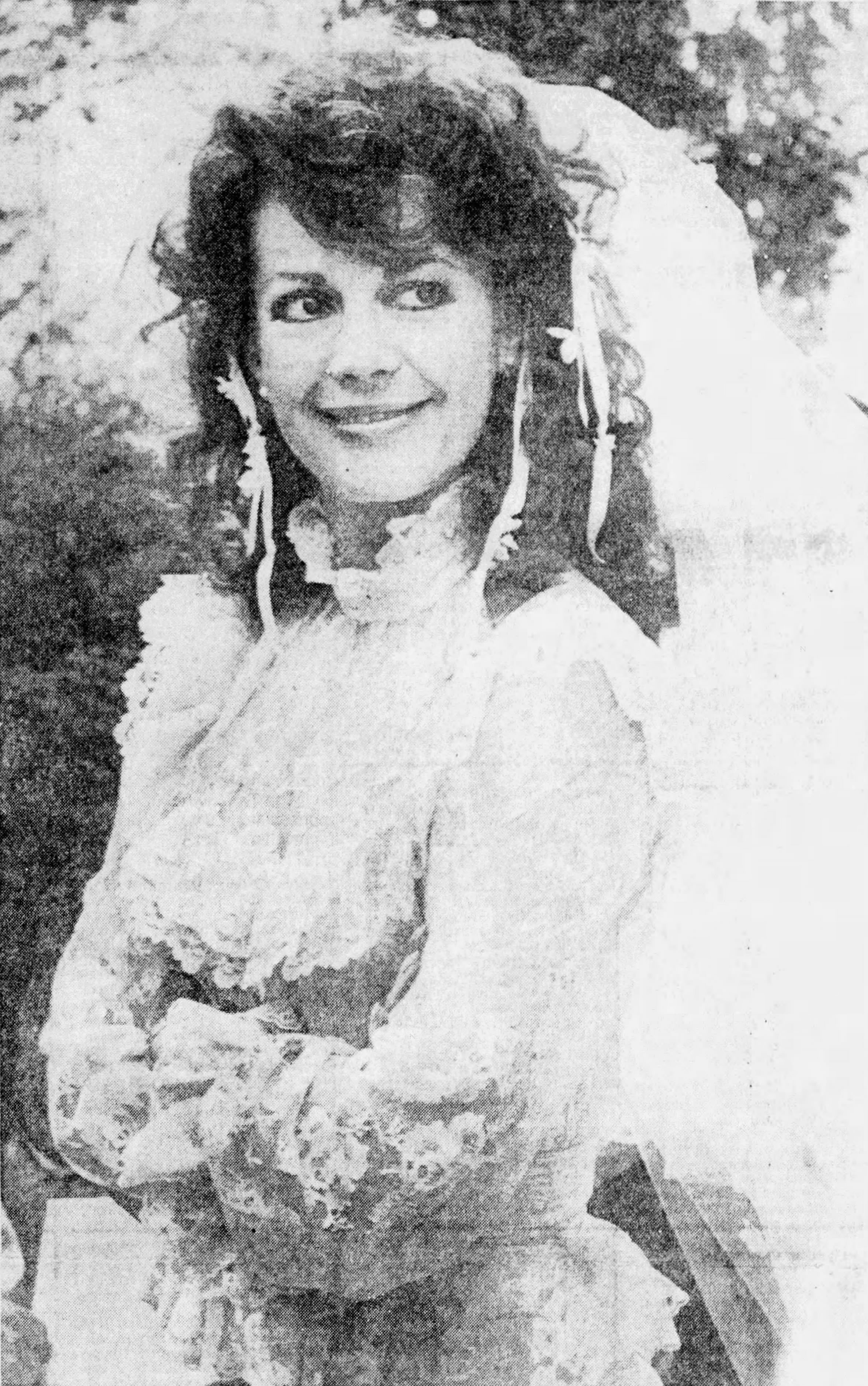
Wood on the set of Brainstorm

Production of Brainstorm was nearly discontinued after Natalie Wood's death by drowning during a production break in November 1981. By this point, Wood had already completed all of her major scenes, but, due to mounting financial problems, MGM took Wood's death as an opportunity to terminate the already troubled production. "When she died," said Trumbull, "all the sets were locked and frozen on all the stages. No one could get in or out without special permission while all the negotiations took place."

Trumbull believed that financially strapped MGM simply got cold feet about providing the remainder of the funds to complete Brainstorm. "MGM's problem was that insurance institution Lloyd's of London, when it took depositions from me and other people, realized that the film could be finished. Why should they pay an insurance claim for something that really wasn't damaged goods?" When MGM refused to pay for the film to be completed, Lloyd's of London provided $2.75 million for Trumbull to complete principal photography and an additional $3.5 million towards post-production.

Meanwhile, other studios showed interest in buying Brainstorm from MGM to release as their own production. "MGM decided to allow Lloyd's of London to offer the film to many of the major studios in town," said Trumbull. "Several of them made bids to MGM. And the studio suddenly realized that a lot of other people in this town were excited about Brainstorm, and were ready to put up millions of dollars. MGM figured they'd look like jerks if they let it go and it turned out to be a big success.

So they finally decided to work out this deal where Lloyd's of London would put up the remaining money and become a profit participant." Trumbull proceeded to complete the film by rewriting the script and using Natalie Wood's younger sister Lana for Wood's few remaining scenes. The film carries the dedication credit "To Natalie".

=== Effects ===
The film was conceived as an introduction to Trumbull's Showscan 60-frames-per-second 70 mm process. "In movies people often do flashbacks and point-of-view shots as a gauzy, mysterious, distant kind of image," Trumbull recalled. "And I wanted to do just the opposite, which was to make the material of the mind even more real and high-impact than 'reality'".

MGM withdrew its plans to release the experimental picture in the new format. Trumbull instead shot the virtual-reality sequences in 24-frames-per-second Super Panavision 70 with an aspect ratio of 2.2:1. The rest of the film was shot in conventional 35mm with an aspect ratio of approximately 1.7 to 1.

== Soundtrack ==
The score to Brainstorm was composed and conducted by James Horner. The score won the Saturn Award for Best Music in 1983. The Varèse Sarabande album/CD release is a re-recording with the London Symphony Orchestra, produced shortly before the original theatrical release.

== Reception and legacy ==
Brainstorm was released on September 30, 1983, almost two years after Wood's death. However, it opened on a small number of screens and with little publicity despite being described unofficially as "Natalie Wood's last movie". Rotten Tomatoes reports that 57% of 21 critics have given the film a positive review with an average rating of 5.69/10.

Janet Maslin of The New York Times gave particular credit to Louise Fletcher's "superb performance". Christopher John reviewed Brainstorm in Ares Magazine Special Edition #2 and commented that "For those looking for nothing more than the same old spaceships and monsters, well, this one probably isn't for you – but then again, you've got all the movies you need this year. Brainstorm is for the rest of us." Roger Ebert of the Chicago Sun-Times gave the film a mixed 2 stars out of a possible 4, describing the premise as "a good idea for a movie" and credited Trumbull with providing "intriguing" special effects. However, Ebert thought the cast was not used well: "The characters take such a secondary importance to the gadget that we never feel much for them."

John Nubbin reviewed Brainstorm for Different Worlds magazine and stated that "Efforts like Brainstorm luckily show that the genre's obituary may be a little further off than I thought."

The film was not a commercial success, with a production budget of $18 million and grossing only $10 million in ticket sales in North America.

Because of the immensely troubled production and disagreements with MGM, Trumbull opted never to direct a Hollywood film again. In 1983 he stated:

I have no interest ... in doing another Hollywood feature film...Absolutely none. The movie business is so totally screwed up that I just don't have the energy to invest three or four years in a feature film. Moviemaking is like waging war. It destroys your personal life, too. The people who can survive the process of making films have largely given up their personal lives in order to do that, just because it's such a battle to make a movie. And in doing that, they've isolated themselves from the very audience that they're trying to reach.

In 2013, he explained that the uncertain circumstances of Natalie Wood's death were the main reason for this decision. He later returned to filmmaking.

== Accolades ==
At the 11th Saturn Awards, Brainstorm won Best Actress for Louise Fletcher and Best Music for James Horner. It also received nominations for Best Science Fiction Film, Best Director, Best Special Effects and a posthumous Best Supporting Actress nomination for Natalie Wood.

== See also ==
- 1983 in film
- BrainGate (implant)
- The Dream Master (1966)
- Dreamscape (1984)
- eXistenZ (1999)
- List of films about angels
- Paprika (2006)
- Patent Pending (1954)
- Rememory (2017)
- Strange Days (1995)
- Tron (1982)
- Virtual reality
