= Donald Trumbull =

Donald Edmund Trumbull (May 27, 1909 – June 7, 2004) was an American pioneer in the field of motion picture special effects.

== Life ==
Trumbull was born in Chicago, Illinois. He was the father of Douglas Trumbull, with whom he worked on several of these film projects. Trumbull died of natural causes at the age of 95 at his daughter's home in Graeagle, California.

== Films worked on (or TV shows if so indicated) ==
- The Wizard of Oz (1939)
- Silent Running (1972)
- Star Wars (1977)
- Close Encounters of the Third Kind (1977)
- Battlestar Galactica (TV, 1978)
- Star Trek: The Motion Picture (1979)
- Firefox (1982)
- Spaceballs (1987)
