= David Dryer =

American visual effects artist

- Education: University of Southern California School of Cinematic Arts
- Occupation: Visual effects artists

David Dryer is an American visual effects artist. He was nominated for an Academy Award in the category Best Visual Effects for the film Blade Runner.

== Selected filmography ==
- Blade Runner (1982; co-nominated with Douglas Trumbull and Richard Yuricich)
