= Saturation 70 =

1969 unfinished film by Tony Foutz

Saturation 70 is an incomplete film written by American writer-director Tony Foutz, and was to star then-five-year-old Julian Brian Jones, the son of Rolling Stone Brian Jones. The film also starred Michelle Phillips and Gram Parsons, as well as Stash Klossowski de Rola and Nudie Cohn. Douglas Trumbull was also attached to the project to provide special effects.

The plot of the story is an update of Alice in Wonderland. A Victorian-era child falls through a wormhole and ends up in a dystopian future Los Angeles where he meets a group of aliens, called the "Kosmic Kiddies," who have come to Earth to save it from pollution.

Much of the principal photography for the film was already complete by the time the funding fell through in April 1970. Filmed scenes included: a shoot out in the Mayfair Market supermarket in Century City, a procession of Ford Edsels in a flying-V formation through the City of Industry, as well as scenes shot on Skid Row in Los Angeles and documentary footage of the 19th Annual Space Convention at Giant Rock, near Joshua Tree, organized by George Van Tassel. All of the scenes were shot guerrilla-style without permits.

== Legacy ==
Gram Parsons convinced the members of his band, The Flying Burrito Brothers, to pose wearing costumes for the film, and the picture appears on the cover of their album Burrito Deluxe. All that exists of the footage from the film is five minutes of footage of the original sixty set to The Flying Burrito Brothers' cover of the Rolling Stones song "Wild Horses" which also appears on Burrito Deluxe.
