= Tour of the Universe =

CN Tower
- Status: Closed
- Cost: $12 million
- Soft opening date: 1985
- Opening date: 1986
- Closing date: 1992

Ride statistics
- Vehicle type: Flight simulator
- Vehicles: 2
- Riders per vehicle: 40
- Rows: 5
- Riders per row: 8
- Duration: 15 minutes

Tour of the Universe was a Space Shuttle simulation ride located in the basement level of the CN Tower. Operating between 1985 and 1992, it was the world's first flight simulator ride.

The ride was the idea of Moses Znaimer and designed by SimEx. The name of the ride, Tour of the Universe, and its content were adapted from a work of the same name cowritten in 1980 by Robert Holdstock and Malcolm Edwards, who sold the rights for the ride.

Construction began in 1984 and the ride began operations in 1986. Built by Showscan Film, the ride used two Boeing 747 simulators designed and built by Redifusion Ltd in Crawley, UK. Showscan designed and built the spacecraft themed cabin that seated the 40 passengers. Director, special effects expert and Showscan owner Douglas Trumbull produced the show film. The ride system and its controls were later the basis for Disneyland's Star Tours ride.

The ride was replaced in 1992 with a similar attraction entitled "Space Race." It was later dismantled and replaced by two other SimEx rides in 1998 and 1999.

Similar rides were proposed for Japan and Australia.

== Story ==
The ride featured a round trip spaceflight to Jupiter. Passengers first boarded an elevator that took them into the depths of the CN Tower and forward to the year 2019, arriving at Spaceport Toronto. Operated by CP Air Interplanetary (or Canadian Interplanetary after CP Air was absorbed by Canadian in 1987), the shuttle resembled the US Space Shuttle, but instead of a cargo bay the ship had a passenger compartment.

Before boarding their flight, passengers moved through various themed areas of the spaceport such as Customs, Security and Medical. Passengers would be able to print out their tickets and be inoculated against space diseases such as "Ganymede Rash".

When aboard the interplanetary shuttle, passengers were launched upward through the hollow core of the CN Tower, arriving at a space station in orbit, and traveling to Jupiter while dodging an asteroid.

== See also ==
- CN Tower
