= Showscan =

Improved film process, invented in the 1980s but not widely adopted

Showscan is a cinematic process developed by Douglas Trumbull that uses 70mm film photographed and projected at 60 frames per second, 2.5 times the standard speed of movie film.

== History ==
Trumbull first came to the public's attention for his work on the groundbreaking special effects in movies such as 2001: A Space Odyssey and The Andromeda Strain. He also directed 1972's Silent Running.

Trumbull developed the Showscan film process in the late 1970s and early 1980s when he became interested in increasing the fidelity or definition of movies. Similar to the quality issues addressed later by high-definition television, the visual fidelity of movies was limited by the medium. When projected onto a large screen, the grain of 35 mm film stock is often quite visible, reducing the quality of the displayed image. The problem is further exacerbated by the larger grain in fast film stock often used to capture high-speed action. Trumbull chose 70 mm film for his new process, to provide higher resolution.

He also did research into frame rate, running a series of tests with 35 mm stock filmed and projected at various speeds, shown to audiences who were instrumented to biometrically test their responses. By measuring their EEG, he found that as the frame rate increased, so did the viewer's emotional reaction. The test subjects' brainwave activity peaked around 60 fps, and he decided to go with that as the norm.

Trumbull theorized that although viewers see smooth motion from film displayed at 24 frames per second, the standard for decades, they are subconsciously aware of the flicker, which reduces the film's emotional impact. Increasing the projection speed decreases the flicker.

There was a demonstration of Showscan in 1986 at Showest, an annual convention for theater owners in Las Vegas, since replaced by Cinemacon. The demonstration was held in the MGM Grand hotel (later known as the Bally Grand and today the Horseshoe Hotel) at a movie theatre on the lower level, which normally showed endless screenings of MGM classics. Theater owners were ushered into the theatre where a large white cyclorama had been set up at the front of the room. The presentation began with what looked like a scratchy 16mm image centered in the screen. After a few minutes, the "film broke", the screen lights came up. You saw a door open behind the screen and a silhouette of a man walked towards the screen and began apologizing and asked if there were people out there. He pushed his face into the screen where you could clearly see the contours of his face distorting the screen. After a second, you realized that there was no man behind the screen, there were no screen lights shining down on the screen and that this entire sequence was being projected onto a blank screen. The level of the illusion was stunning. Having just viewed Trumbull's "New Magic" Showscan Film.

In 1992, Trumbull, Geoffrey Williamson, Robert Auguste and Edmund DiGiulio received a Scientific and Engineering Academy Award for the design of the CP-65 Showscan camera system.

Showscan Film Corporation, which produced and marketed the equipment, underwent Chapter 7 bankruptcy in 2002. The process was then acquired by a new company, Showscan Entertainment.

After going through several ownership, the California Based Showscan Entertainment was acquired by a Korean animation company. Which since has converted its existing film based venues over to digital venues.

== Uses ==
Trumbull produced a few short films to demonstrate this process, including “Night of the Dreams” and “New Magic.”

The 1983 feature film Brainstorm was intended to be the first Showscan feature, with the “normal” scenes in 35mm, and the virtual reality scenes in Showscan, but this plan proved too cumbersome. Instead, the virtual reality scenes ended up being shot in 70mm but at the standard 24 frames per second.

Since then, Showscan has been used mostly for short ride films in conjunction with powered motion simulator seats, such as Tour of the Universe — the world’s first flight-simulator ride, which was also produced by Trumbull. In the early 1980's, Trumbull had theaters with 70mm @ 60FPS projectors installed at select ShowBiz Pizza restaurants.

== Archive ==
The Academy Film Archive houses the Showscan Collection, consisting of negatives and soundtrack elements for numerous short films created for World's Fair expositions, special venue attractions, and motion-based simulator rides.

== See also ==
- Slit-scan photography
