= Close Encounters of the Third Kind =

1977 science fiction film by Steven Spielberg

- Theatrical release poster
- Directed by: Steven Spielberg
- Written by: Steven Spielberg
- Produced by: Julia Phillips; Michael Phillips
- Starring: Richard Dreyfuss; Teri Garr; Melinda Dillon; François Truffaut
- Cinematography: Vilmos Zsigmond
- Edited by: Michael Kahn
- Music by: John Williams
- Production companies: Columbia Pictures; EMI Films
- Distributed by: Columbia Pictures
- Release date: November 16, 1977
- Running time: 135 minutes (Theatrical version); 132 minutes (Special Edition); 137 minutes (Director's Cut)
- Country: United States
- Language: English
- Budget: $19.4 million
- Box office: $306.9 million

Close Encounters of the Third Kind is a 1977 American science fiction drama film written and directed by Steven Spielberg, starring Richard Dreyfuss, Melinda Dillon, Teri Garr, Bob Balaban, Cary Guffey, and François Truffaut. The film depicts the interconnected stories of Roy Neary (Dreyfuss), an everyday blue-collar worker in Indiana whose life changes after an encounter with an unidentified flying object (UFO); Jillian Guiler (Dillon), a single mother whose three-year-old son Barry is abducted during the same UFO manifestation; and Claude Lacombe (Truffaut), a French scientist pursuing a link between recent unexplained scientific phenomena across the globe.

Close Encounters was a long-cherished project for Spielberg. In late 1973, he developed a deal with Columbia Pictures for a science-fiction film. Though Spielberg received sole credit for the script, he was assisted by Paul Schrader, John Hill, David Giler, Hal Barwood, Matthew Robbins, and Jerry Belson, all of whom contributed to the screenplay in varying degrees. The title is derived from astronomer and Ufologist J. Allen Hynek's classification of close encounters with extraterrestrials, in which the third kind denotes human observations of extraterrestrials or "animate beings". Douglas Trumbull served as the visual effects supervisor, while Carlo Rambaldi designed the aliens.

Made on a production budget of US$19.4 million, Close Encounters was released in a limited number of cities on November 16 and 23, 1977, and expanded into wide release the following month. It was a critical and financial success, eventually grossing over $300 million worldwide and becoming the third highest-grossing film of 1977 behind only Star Wars and Smokey and the Bandit. It received numerous awards and nominations at the 50th Academy Awards, 32nd British Academy Film Awards, the 35th Golden Globe Awards and the 5th Saturn Awards, and has been widely acclaimed by the American Film Institute. It was praised for its visual effects, story, themes, performances (particularly Dreyfuss, Dillon, and Truffaut), cinematography, musical score, editing, and Spielberg’s direction.

In December 2007, it was deemed "culturally, historically, or aesthetically significant" by the United States Library of Congress and selected for preservation in the National Film Registry. A Special Edition was released theatrically in 1980. Spielberg agreed to create this edition to add more scenes that they had been unable to include in the original release, with the studio demanding a controversial scene depicting the interior of the extraterrestrial mothership. Spielberg's dissatisfaction with the altered ending scene led to a third version, the Director's Cut on VHS and LaserDisc in 1998 (and later DVD and Blu-ray). It is the longest version, combining Spielberg's favorite elements from both previous editions but removing the scenes inside the mothership. The film was later remastered in 4K and was then re-released in theaters on September 1, 2017, by Sony Pictures Releasing for its 40th anniversary.

== Plot ==
In 1977, French scientist Claude Lacombe, along with interpreter and cartographer David Laughlin, examines Flight 19—a group of United States Navy aircraft that vanished over the Bermuda Triangle in 1945—now found immaculate and abandoned in the Sonoran Desert. They later learn that the SS Cotopaxi has similarly been found abandoned in the middle of the Gobi Desert. Meanwhile, near Indianapolis, two airplanes narrowly avoid a mid-air collision with an unidentified flying object (UFO).

At a rural home outside Muncie, Indiana, three-year-old Barry Guiler wakes to find his toys operating on their own and the fridge ransacked. He follows a trail outside before his mother, Jillian, catches him. Widespread power outages occur throughout the area, forcing electric utility lineman Roy Neary to investigate. En route, Roy experiences a close encounter with a UFO, and when it flies over his truck, it lightly burns the side of his face with its lights. The UFO takes off with three others in the sky, as Roy and police officers unsuccessfully pursue them by road.

Roy becomes fascinated with the UFOs and obsessed with a subliminal image of a mountainous shape, repeatedly making models of it. His increasingly erratic and eccentric behavior worries his wife Ronnie and their three children, and his friends and neighbors ostracize him. Ronnie eventually leaves with the children after Roy brings dirt, bricks, and other debris into their home to sculpt a large scale replica of the mountain. Jillian also begins compulsively sketching the same mountain. Soon after, she is terrorized in her home by a UFO which descends from the clouds. She fights off aggressive attempts by unseen beings to enter the home, but in the chaos, Barry is abducted.

Lacombe, Laughlin, and a group of United Nations experts continue to investigate increasing UFO activity and strange, related occurrences. Witnesses in Dharamsala, Northern India report that the UFOs make distinctive sounds: a five-tone musical phrase. Scientists broadcast the phrase to outer space, but receive only a seemingly meaningless repeating series of numbers in response. Laughlin eventually recognizes it as a set of geographical coordinates, which point to Devils Tower near Moorcroft, Wyoming.

The US Army evacuates the area around Devils Tower, planting false reports in the media that a train wreck has spilled a toxic nerve gas, while actually preparing a secret landing site for the UFOs. Seeing the mountain on the news, Roy and Jillian recognize it as the one they have been visualizing. Despite the evacuation order, they, along with others who have been experiencing the visions, set out for Devils Tower, but are intercepted by the Army. Lacombe interviews Roy, who is unable to explain his compulsion to reach the mountain beyond seeking answers. While the others are escorted away, Roy and Jillian escape and eventually reach the mountain site just as UFOs appear in the night sky.

The specialists there begin to communicate with the UFOs—which gradually appear by the dozens—by using light and sound on a large electrical billboard. An enormous mothership eventually lands and seemingly conveys to the researchers a tonal means of communication. A hatch opens, from which the mothership releases Flight 19 pilots, Cotopaxi sailors, and Barry, who reunites with Jillian, along with various other humans and some animals, all having not aged since they were taken. Seeing Roy, Lacombe suggests preparing him for inclusion in the government's select group of potential visitors to the mothership.

The extraterrestrials finally emerge from the mothership and select Roy to join their travels. After Roy enters the mothership, one of the extraterrestrials pauses for a few moments with the humans. Lacombe uses Curwen hand signs that correspond to the five-note tonal phrase. The extraterrestrial responds in kind, smiles, and returns to its ship, which takes to the sky.

== Cast ==
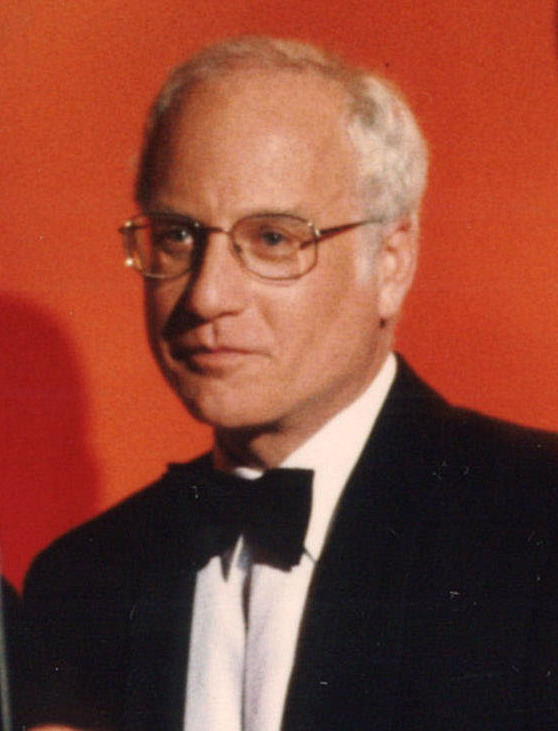
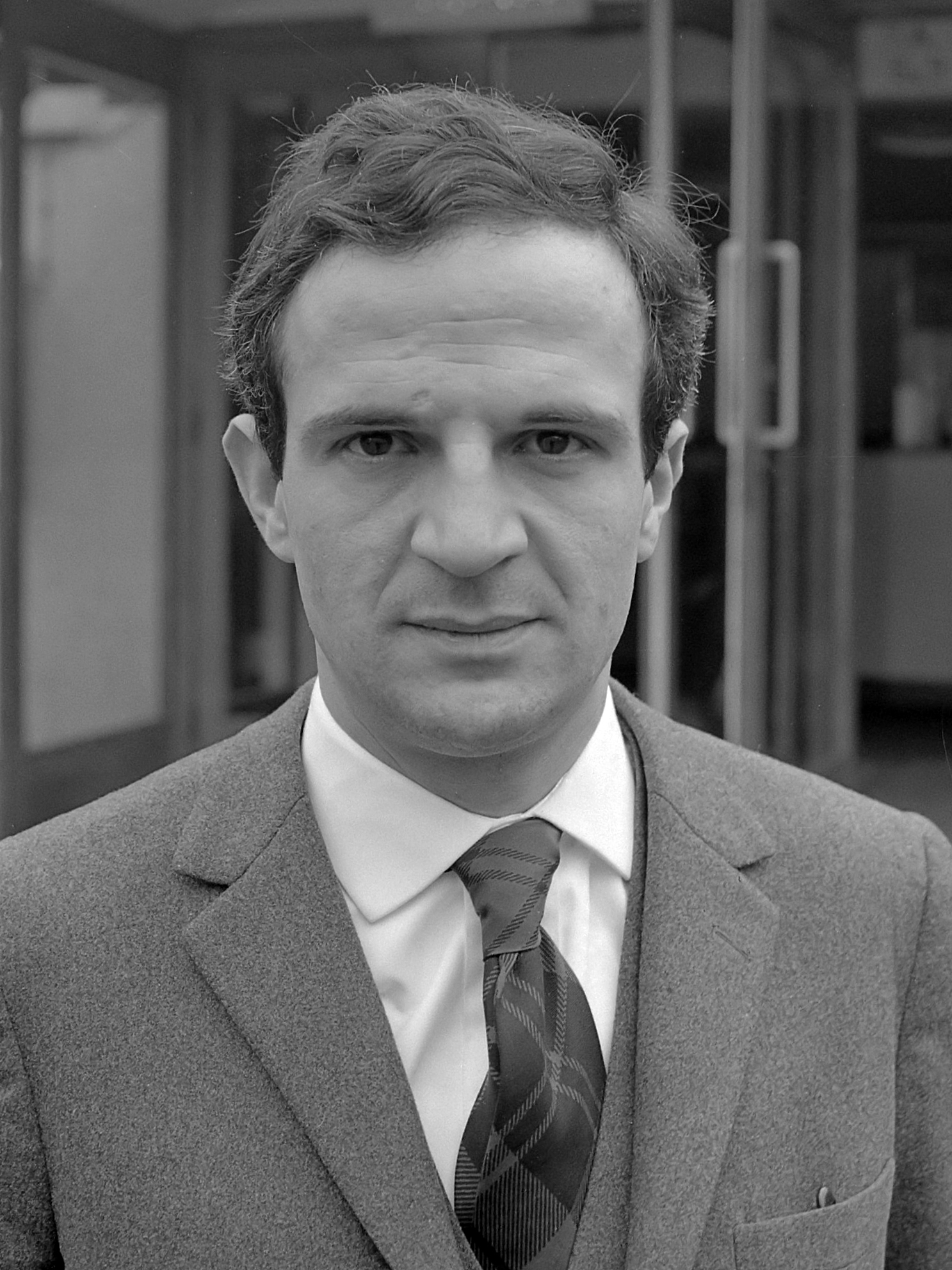
(Left to right) Richard Dreyfuss (pictured in 1996), Melinda Dillon (1976), and François Truffaut (1965)
- Richard Dreyfuss as Roy Neary, A Vietnam veteran and a electrical lineman in Indiana who encounters and forms an obsession with unidentified flying objects. Steve McQueen was Spielberg's first choice. Although McQueen was impressed with the script, he said that he was not right for the role as he was unable to cry on cue. James Caan, Dustin Hoffman, Al Pacino, and Gene Hackman also turned down the part. Robert De Niro was also considered. Jack Nicholson declined because of scheduling conflicts. Spielberg explained that when filming Jaws, "Dreyfuss talked me into casting him. He listened to about 155 days' worth of Close Encounters. He even contributed ideas." Dreyfuss reflected, "I launched myself into a campaign to get the part. I would walk by Steve's office and say stuff like 'Al Pacino has no sense of humor' or 'Jack Nicholson is too crazy'. I eventually convinced him to cast me."
- François Truffaut as Claude Lacombe, a French government scientist in charge of UFO-related activities in the United States. The UFO expert Jacques Vallée served as the real-life model for Lacombe. Gérard Depardieu, Philippe Noiret, Jean-Louis Trintignant, and Lino Ventura were considered for the role. Internationally renowned as a film director, this is Truffaut's only acting role in a film he did not direct, and his only role in an English-language film. During filming, Truffaut used his free time to write the script for The Man Who Loved Women. He also worked on the novel The Actor, which he abandoned.
- Teri Garr as Ronnie Neary, Roy's wife. Meryl Streep and Amy Irving also auditioned for the role.
- Melinda Dillon as Jillian Guiler. Garr wanted to portray Jillian, but was cast as Ronnie. Hal Ashby, who worked with Dillon on Bound for Glory (1976), suggested her for the part to Spielberg. Dillon was cast three days before filming began.
- Bob Balaban as David Laughlin, Lacombe's assistant and English-French interpreter
- J. Patrick McNamara as Project Leader
- Warren J. Kemmerling as Major "Wild Bill" Walsh
- Roberts Blossom as Farmer
- Phil Dodds as Jean Claude
- Cary Guffey as Barry Guiler, Jillian's son. Spielberg conducted a series of method acting techniques to help Guffey, who was cast when he was three years old.
- Lance Henriksen as Robert
- Merrill Connally as Team Leader
- George DiCenzo as Major Benchley
- Gene Dynarski as Ike
- Josef Sommer as Larry Butler
- Carl Weathers as Military Police
- David Abraham Cheulkar as English-Hindi interpreter

== Production ==
=== Development ===
The film's inspiration arose in director Steven Spielberg's childhood, when he and his father watched a meteor shower in New Jersey. At age 18, Spielberg completed the full-length science fiction film Firelight. Many scenes from Firelight were said to have been incorporated into Close Encounters on a shot-for-shot basis. Since the former film is lost, however, the accuracy of that statement cannot be confirmed. In 1970, he wrote the short story "Experiences" about a lovers' lane in a Midwestern farming community and the "light show" a group of teenagers see in the night sky. In late 1973, after completing work on The Sugarland Express, Spielberg developed a deal with Columbia Pictures for a science-fiction film. 20th Century Fox had previously turned down the offer. Julia and Michael Phillips signed on as producers.

Spielberg first considered doing a documentary or low-budget feature film about people who believed in UFOs. He decided "a film that depended on state-of-the-art technology couldn't be made for $2.5 million." Borrowing a phrase from the ending of The Thing from Another World, he retitled the film Watch the Skies, rewriting the premise concerning Project Blue Book and pitching the concept to Willard Huyck and Gloria Katz. Katz remembered, "It had flying saucers from outer space landing on Robertson Boulevard [in West Hollywood, California]. I go, 'Steve, that's the worst idea I ever heard.'" Spielberg brought Paul Schrader to write the script in December 1973 with principal photography to begin in late 1974. To discuss the script, Spielberg visited the home where Schrader lived with his brother Leonard. However, Spielberg started work on Jaws in 1974, delaying Watch the Skies.

With the financial and critical success of Jaws, Spielberg was able to negotiate a high degree of creative control from Columbia, including the right to make the film any way he wanted. Schrader submitted his script, which Spielberg called "one of the most embarrassing screenplays ever professionally turned in to a major film studio or director" and "a terribly guilt-ridden story not about UFOs at all". Titled Kingdom Come, the script's protagonist was a 45-year-old Air Force officer named Paul Van Owen who worked with Project Blue Book. "[His] job for the government is to ridicule and debunk flying saucers." Schrader continued: "One day he has an encounter. He goes to the government, threatening to blow the lid off to the public. Instead, he and the government spend 15 years trying to make contact."

Spielberg and Schrader experienced creative differences, hiring John Hill to rewrite. At one point, the main character was a police officer. Spielberg "[found] it hard to identify with men in uniform. I wanted to have Mr. Everyday Regular Fella." Spielberg rejected the Schrader/Hill script during post-production on Jaws, reflecting that "they wanted to make it like a James Bond adventure".

David Giler performed a rewrite; Hal Barwood and Matthew Robbins, friends of Spielberg, suggested the plot device of a kidnapped child. Spielberg then began to write the script. The song "When You Wish upon a Star" from Pinocchio influenced Spielberg's writing style. "I hung my story on the mood the song created, the way it affected me personally." During pre-production, the title was changed from Kingdom Come to Close Encounters of the Third Kind.

J. Allen Hynek, who worked with the United States Air Force on Project Blue Book, was hired as a scientific consultant. Hynek said that "even though the film is fiction, it's based for the most part on the known facts of the UFO mystery, and it certainly catches the flavor of the phenomenon. Spielberg was under enormous pressure to make another blockbuster after Jaws, but he decided to make a UFO film. He put his career on the line." USAF and NASA declined to cooperate on the film. NASA reportedly sent a twenty-page letter to Spielberg, telling him that releasing the film was dangerous. In an interview, he said: "I really found my faith when I heard that the Government was opposed to the film. If NASA took the time to write me a 20-page letter, then I knew there must be something happening."

Early in pre-production, Spielberg hired film title designer Dan Perri to design a logotype. Perri, who had previously worked on The Exorcist (1973) and Taxi Driver (1976), produced a logotype in Handel Gothic typeface, with only a script to work from. Delighted with the result, Spielberg applied the logo to all production stationery and crew shirts. Unusual in filmmaking, Spielberg carried enough influence to maintain creative control over the film's entire branding and asked Perri to design the advertising campaign and title sequence based on his logo.

Perri later designed titles for many other major Hollywood pictures, including Star Wars (1977), Raging Bull (1980), and Airplane! (1980).

=== Filming ===
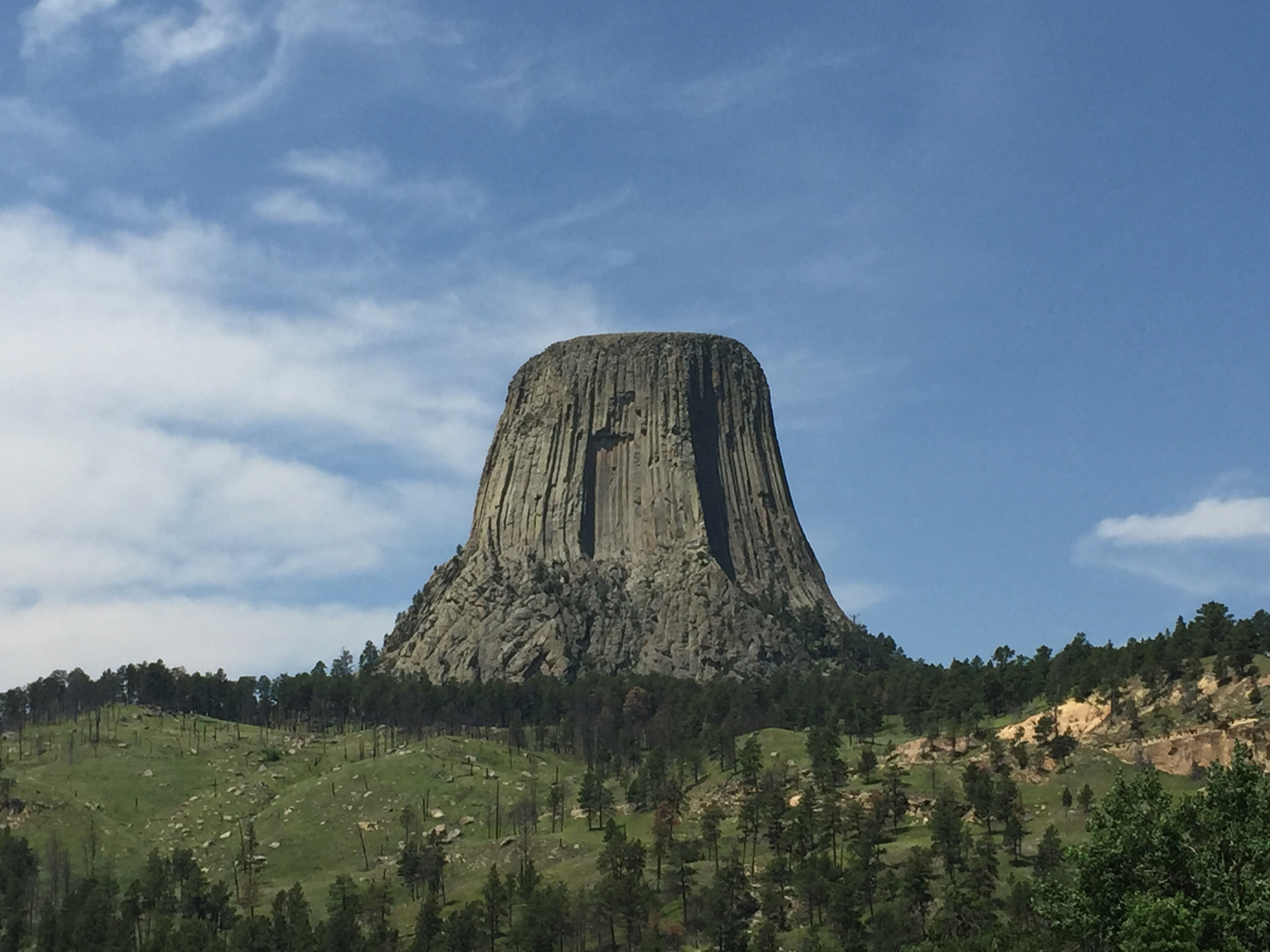
Devils Tower in Wyoming was a filming location.

Principal photography began on May 16, 1976, though an Associated Press report in August 1975 had suggested filming would start in late 1975. Spielberg did not want to do any location shooting because of his negative experience on Jaws and wanted to shoot Close Encounters entirely on sound stages, but eventually dropped the idea.

Filming took place in Burbank, California; Devils Tower National Monument in Wyoming; two abandoned World War II airship hangars at the former Brookley Air Force Base in Mobile, Alabama; and the Louisville and Nashville Railroad depot in Bay Minette, Alabama. The home where Barry is abducted is located outside the town of Fairhope, Alabama. Roy Neary's home is on Carlisle Drive East in Mobile. The UFOs fly through the former toll booth at the Vincent Thomas Bridge, San Pedro, California. The Sonora Desert sequence was photographed at the Dumont Dunes, California, and the Dharmsala-India exteriors were filmed at the small village of Hal near Khalapur, 35 kilometres (22 mi) outside Mumbai, India. The hangars in Alabama were six times larger than the biggest sound stage in the world. Various technical and budgetary problems occurred during filming. Spielberg called the production of Close Encounters "twice as bad and twice as expensive [as Jaws]". Matters worsened when Columbia Pictures experienced financial difficulties. In his original 1973 pitch to Columbia, Spielberg claimed production would cost $2.7 million, although he revealed to producer Julia Phillips that he knew the budget would have to be much higher; the final budget came to $19.4 million. Columbia studio executive John Veich remembered: "If we knew it was going to cost that much, we wouldn't have greenlighted it because we didn't have the money." Spielberg hired Joe Alves, his collaborator on Jaws, as production designer. In addition, the 1976 Atlantic hurricane season brought tropical storms to Alabama. A large portion of the sound stage in Alabama was damaged because of a lightning strike. Columbia raised $7 million from three sources: Time, EMI, and German tax shelters.

Cinematographer Vilmos Zsigmond said that, during shooting, Spielberg got more ideas by watching films every night, which in turn extended the production schedule because he was continually adding new scenes. Zsigmond previously turned down the chance to work on Jaws. In her 1991 book You'll Never Eat Lunch in This Town Again, producer Julia Phillips wrote highly profane remarks about Spielberg, Zsigmond, and Truffaut, because she was fired during post-production due to a cocaine addiction. Phillips blamed it on Spielberg being a perfectionist.

=== Visual effects ===
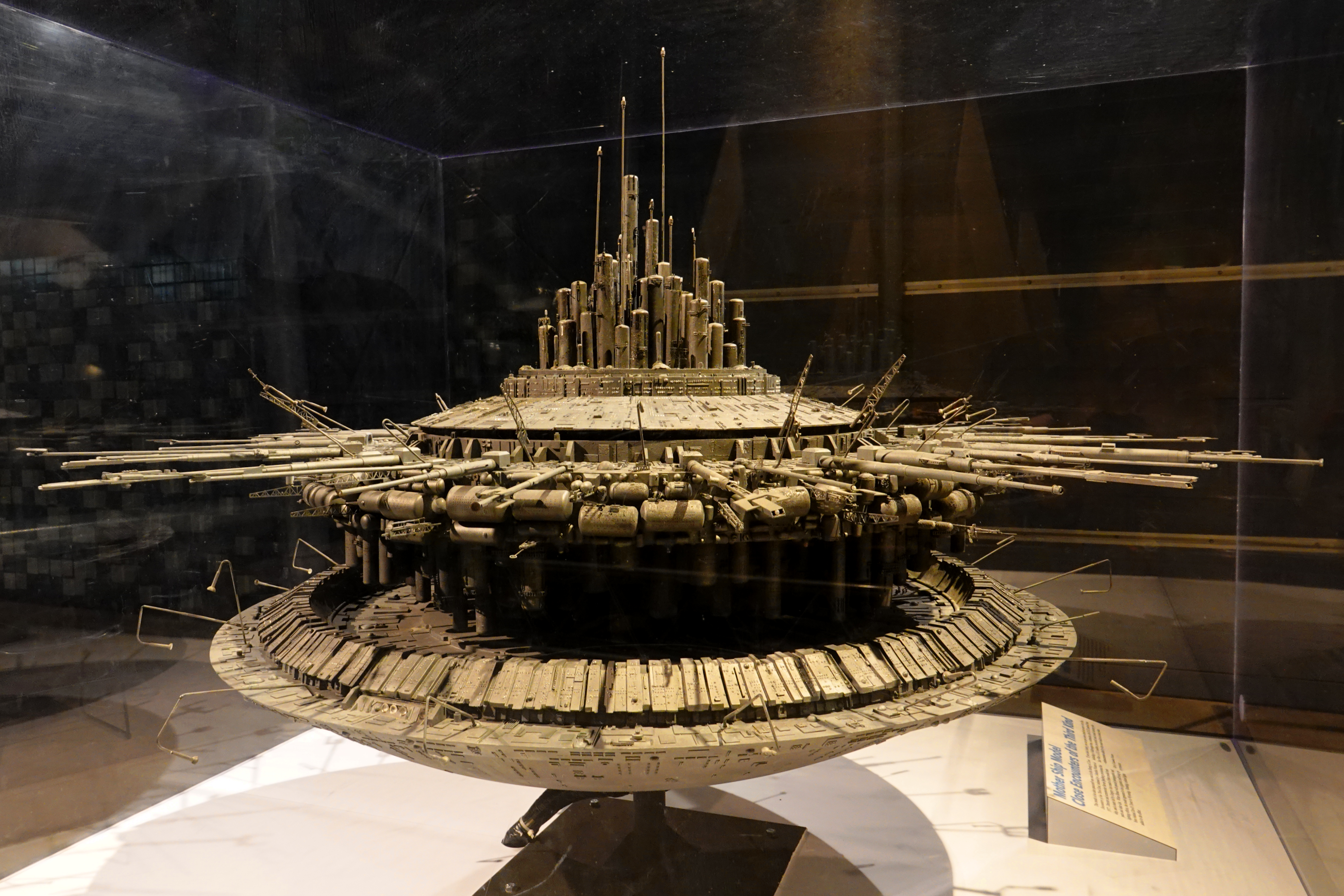
This visual effects miniature model is on display at the Smithsonian's National Air and Space Museum.

Douglas Trumbull was the visual effects supervisor, and Carlo Rambaldi designed the extraterrestrials. Trumbull joked that the visual effects budget of $3.3 million could have been used to produce an additional film. His work helped lead to advances in motion control photography. The mothership was designed by Ralph McQuarrie and built by Greg Jein. The look of the ship was inspired by an oil refinery Spielberg saw at night in India. Instead of the metallic hardware look of Star Wars, the emphasis was on luminescence of the UFOs. One of the UFO models was an oxygen mask with lights attached to it, used because of its irregular shape.

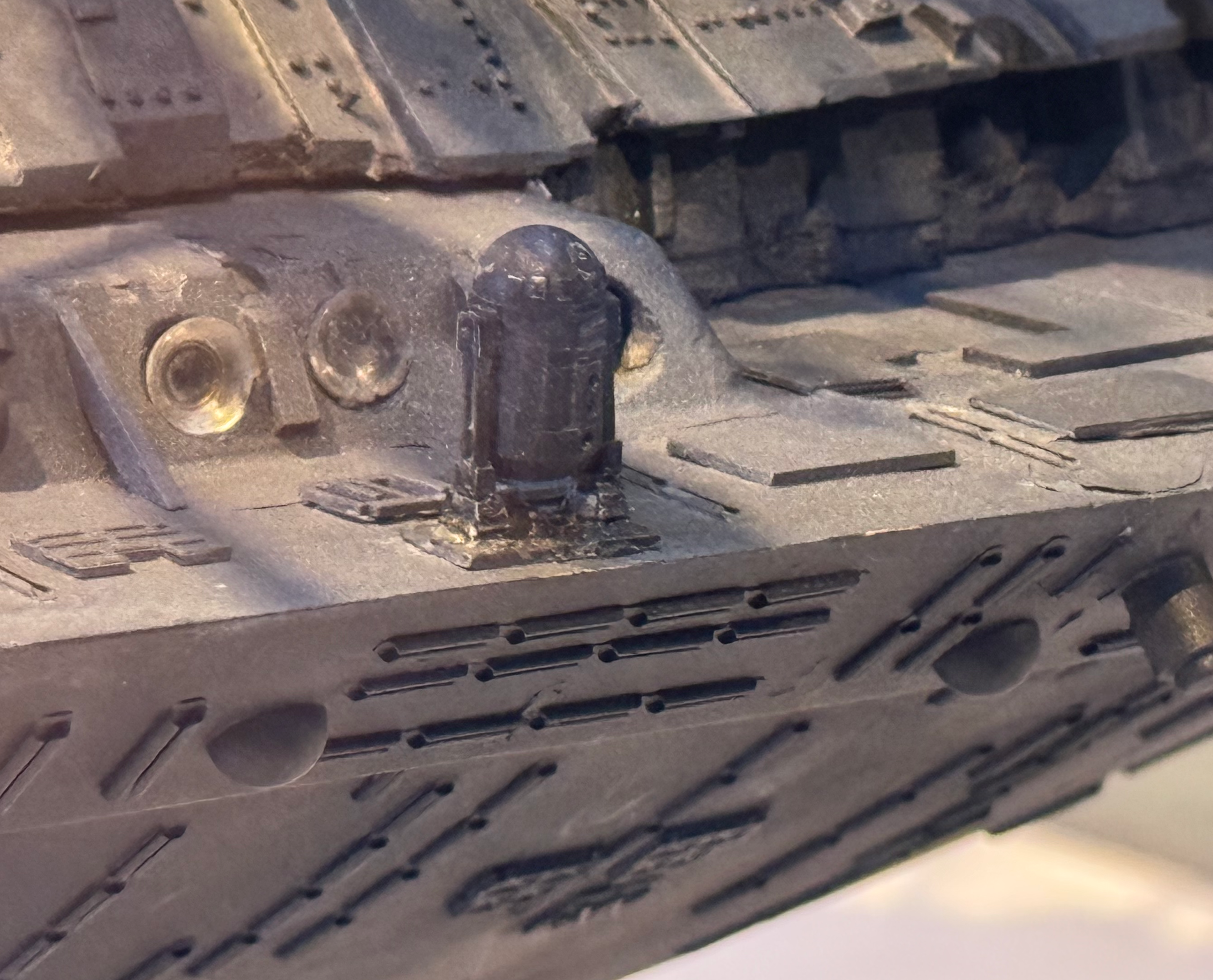
R2-D2 figure on the mothership model

As a subtle in-joke, Dennis Muren (who had just finished working on Star Wars) put a small R2-D2 model onto the underside of the mothership and a pea-sized TIE fighter to the end of one of the structures extending from the mothership. Model makers also included a mailbox, great-white shark, Volkswagen bus, and a small graveyard. The model also included alien figures moving in the windows of the miniature, though were not very visible in the final film. The mothership model is on permanent display steps away from the space shuttle orbiter Discovery in the Smithsonian Institution's Air and Space Museum Udvar-Hazy Annex at Washington Dulles Airport in Chantilly, Virginia.

Close Encounters was filmed anamorphically and the visual effects sequences were shot on 70 mm film, which has greater resolution than the 35 mm film used for the rest of the production, so that when the miniature effects were combined with full-sized elements through an optical printer, the effects footage would still appear clear and sharp though having lost one generation's worth of visual fidelity. Colin Cantwell made a CGI test reel for the UFOs, but Spielberg found it would be too expensive and ineffective because CGI was in its infancy in the mid-1970s.

The small extraterrestrials in the final scenes were played by fifty local six-year-old girls in Mobile, Alabama. That decision was requested by Spielberg because "girls move more gracefully than boys". Puppetry was attempted for the extraterrestrials, but the idea failed. However, Rambaldi successfully used puppetry to depict two of the extraterrestrials, starting with a marionette (for the tall extraterrestrial that is the first emerging from the mothership in what was originally a test shot) and an articulated puppet for the extraterrestrial that communicates via hand signals near the end of the film.

=== Post-production ===
Close Encounters is the first collaboration between film editor Michael Kahn and Spielberg. Their working relationship has continued for the rest of Spielberg's films. Spielberg said that no film he has ever made since has been as hard to edit as the last 25 minutes of Close Encounters and that he and Kahn went through thousands of feet of film to find the right shots for the end sequence. When Kahn and Spielberg completed the first cut of the film, Spielberg was dissatisfied because "there wasn't enough wow-ness". Pick-ups were commissioned but cinematographer Vilmos Zsigmond could not participate due to other commitments. John A. Alonzo, László Kovács, and Douglas Slocombe worked on the pick-ups. Lacombe was originally intended to find Flight 19 hidden in the Amazon rainforest, but the idea was changed to the Sonoran Desert. Spielberg also took 7.5 minutes out from the preview.

== Music ==
Five-note tonal phrase featured in the story

The film score was composed, conducted, and produced by John Williams, who had previously worked on Spielberg's Jaws, and performed by the Hollywood Studio Symphony. Williams included the ominous two note phrase of the Jaws theme delivered by the mothership.

Williams wrote more than 300 examples of the iconic five-tone motif, to be used by scientists to communicate with the visiting spaceship as a mathematical language, before Spielberg chose the one incorporated into the film's signature theme. Williams decided on five notes because "it has to be somewhere between a fragment ... which is four notes, and a song ... which is seven notes, so he decided, mathematically, it would be five notes."

Spielberg called Williams's work "'When You Wish Upon a Star' meets science fiction". Incidentally, Williams briefly included the signature melody into the score at Spielberg's behest, just before Roy Neary turns to board the mothership. The synthesizer playing the five notes is an ARP 2500. Vice President of Engineering at ARP Instruments, Phillip Dodds, was sent to install the unit on the film set and was subsequently cast as Jean Claude, the musician who plays the sequence on the huge synthesizer in an attempt to communicate with the extraterrestrial mothership.

Spielberg initially included Cliff Edwards's original "When You Wish Upon a Star" from Pinocchio in the closing credits, but after a Dallas preview where several members of the audience audibly snickered at the inclusion, the song was dropped and replaced with Williams's orchestral version. Phrases from "When You Wish Upon a Star" are included in the final sequence in the director's cut and in the special edition of the end titles on the 1998 Collector's Edition of the soundtrack.

The score was recorded at Warner Bros. Studios in Burbank, California. Williams was nominated for two Academy Awards in 1978, one for his score to Star Wars and one for his score to Close Encounters. He won for Star Wars, though he later won two Grammy Awards in 1979 for his Close Encounters score (one for Best Original Film Score and one for Best Instrumental Composition for "Theme from Close Encounters").

== Themes ==
Film critic Charlene Engel observed:

Close Encounters suggests that humankind has reached the point where it is ready to enter the community of the cosmos. While it is a computer which makes the final musical conversation with the extraterrestrial guests possible, the characteristics bringing Neary to make his way to Devils Tower have little to do with technical expertise or computer literacy. These are virtues taught in schools that will be evolved in the 21st century.

The film also evokes typical science fiction archetypes and motifs. The film portrays new technologies as a natural and expected outcome of human development and indication of health and growth.

Other critics found a variety of Judeo-Christian analogies. Devils Tower parallels Mount Sinai, the extraterrestrials as God, and Roy Neary as Moses. Cecil B. DeMille's The Ten Commandments is on television at the Neary household. Some found close relations between Elijah and Roy; Elijah was taken into a "chariot of fire", akin to Roy boarding the UFO. Climbing Devils Tower behind the faltering Jillian, Roy exhorts Jillian to keep moving and not to look back, a contrast to Lot's wife, who looked back at Sodom and turned into a pillar of salt. Spielberg explained: "I wanted to make Close Encounters a very accessible story about the everyday individual who has a sighting that overturns his life, and throws it into complete upheaval as he starts to become more and more obsessed with this experience."

Roy's wife Ronnie attempts to hide the sunburn caused by Roy's exposure to the UFOs and wants him to forget his encounter with them. She is embarrassed and bewildered by what has happened to him and desperately wants her ordinary life back. The expression of his lost life is seen when he is sculpting a huge model of Devils Tower in his living room, with his family deserting him. Roy's obsession with an idea implanted by an extraterrestrial intelligence, his construction of the model, and his gradual loss of contact with his wife, mimic the events in the short story "Dulcie and Decorum" (1955) by Damon Knight.

Close Encounters studies the form of "youth spiritual yearning". Barry Guiler, the unfearing child who refers to the UFOs and their paraphernalia as "toys" (although that was unscripted, with the child being drawn to smile by being shown toys offscreen), serves as a motif for childlike innocence and openness in the face of the unknown. Spielberg also compared the theme of communication as highlighting that of tolerance: "If we can talk to extraterrestrials in Close Encounters of the Third Kind, why not with the Reds in the Cold War?" Sleep is the final obstacle to overcome in the ascent of Devils Tower. Roy, Jillian, and a third invitee, Larry Butler, climb the mountain pursued by government helicopters spraying sleeping gas. Larry stops to rest, is gassed, and falls into a deep sleep.

In his interview with Spielberg on Inside the Actors Studio, James Lipton suggested Close Encounters has another, more personal theme for Spielberg: "Your father was a computer engineer; your mother was a concert pianist, and when the spaceship lands, they make music together on the computer", suggesting that Roy Neary's boarding the spaceship represents Spielberg's wish to be reunited with his parents. The director had not consciously intended this aspect. In a 2005 interview, Spielberg stated that he made Close Encounters when he did not have children, and if he were making it today, he would never have had Roy leave his family and board the mothership.

Communication and language issues constitute additional themes as noted by Andrew Johnston in Time Out New York: "Throughout the film, there are many scenes that anticipate themes Spielberg would explore in subsequent projects, but his execution of these ideas here is usually more interesting and subtle. In Amistad, for example, he devotes much time to illustrating the language barrier separating Africans from both their captors and their potential saviors. It's an essential plot point, but it's so belabored that the story gets bogged down. In Close Encounters, the language problem is illustrated concisely by a quick scene in which an interpreter translates Spanish into English for Laughlin so he can turn around and translate it into French for Lacombe. Since Spielberg doesn't ram the language problem down our throats, the extraterrestrials' solution—using music to communicate with humanity—seems more elegant and natural."

== Release and reception ==
=== Box office ===
The film was to be released in mid-1977 but was delayed to November because of the various production problems.

Close Encounters premiered at the Ziegfeld Theatre in New York City on November 16, 1977, and continued there and at the Cinerama Dome in Los Angeles, grossing $1,077,000. Its national release was December 14, in 270 theaters and grossing $10,115,000 in one week with a per-screen average of $37,460. On December 21, 301 more theaters were added. By the end of the second week of national release it had grossed $24,695,317.

It made a record $3,026,558 on December 26, 1977, and set a one-week record of $17,393,654 from December 26 to January 1. The film opened internationally on February 24, 1978, and grossed $27 million by the end of March from 19 countries. Close Encounters received mostly positive reviews and became a certified box office success, grossing $116.39 million in the United States and Canada, and $171.7 million in other countries, for $288 million worldwide.

It was the most successful Columbia Pictures film at that time.

Released in conjunction with Close Encounters of the Third Kind was a novelization of the film, credited solely to Steven Spielberg but largely ghostwritten by Leslie Waller. Spielberg later explained to Starlog magazine,

It was very early on when we made the deal with [the publishers] Dell... It included an advance with a promise that I was going to have direct writing input into the book. But post-production on the movie became so impossible that I had to get somebody else to write it. I didn't write the first, second, or third drafts. Those were written, based on my screenplay, by Leslie Waller, a very good writer. When I read his drafts, though, I told the publishers that unless it was cleaned up I wouldn't let my name go out with the book. So I sat down and spent less than a week – I wouldn't say rewriting the novel – but polishing it, and taking a lot of the plot and twisting it back into the direction of the screenplay. All told, there's about 20 percent of me in the book. I wish I could say there was more, but there's not. I cringe when I see my name on the cover, and I usually avoid it at bookstores. Actually, I've never bought a copy.

=== Critical reception ===
Jonathan Rosenbaum refers to the film as "the best expression of Spielberg's benign, dreamy-eyed vision". Arthur D. Murphy of Variety magazine gave a positive review but wrote that Close Encounters "lacks the warmth and humanity" of George Lucas's Star Wars. Murphy found most of the film slow-paced, but praised the climax. Vincent Canby of The New York Times wrote that Close Encounters was "the best—the most elaborate‐1950's science fiction movie ever made, a work that borrows its narrative shape and its concerns from those earlier films, but enhances them with what looks like the latest developments in movie and space technology."

On the television program Sneak Previews, Gene Siskel and Roger Ebert highly recommended the film. Siskel praised the message of not being "afraid of the unknown", said Dreyfuss was "perfectly cast", and described the ending as "a wonderful scene, combining fantasy, adventure and mystery". However, he mentioned that the story got "bogged down" by a subplot in the middle. Ebert said "the last 30 minutes are among the most marvelous things I've ever seen on the screen" and that the film was "like a kid's picture...in its innocence". Pauline Kael of The New Yorker similarly called it "a kid's film in the best sense". Kael wrote that,

Spielberg is the son of an electrical-engineer, sci-fi-addict father and a classical-pianist mother, and in the climax of the film he does justice to both. Under the French scientist's direction, the earthlings are ready with a console, and they greet the great craft with an oboe solo variation on the five-note theme; the craft answers in deep, tuba tones. The dialogue becomes blissfully garrulous. And with light flooding out from the windows of this omniscient airship—it's like New York's skyscrapers all lighted up on a summer night—there is a conversational duet: the music of the spheres. This is one of the peerless moments in movie history—spiritually reassuring, magical, and funny at the same time. Very few movies have ever hit upon this combination of fantasy and amusement—The Wizard of Oz, perhaps, in a plainer, down-home way.

The review aggregator website Rotten Tomatoes reports that 91% out of 117 reviews were positive, with an average rating of 9.1/10. The website's consensus reads: "Close Encounters of the Third Kind is deeply humane sci-fi exploring male obsession, cosmic mysticism, and music." On Metacritic, the film has a weighted average score of 90 out of 100, based on 10 reviews, indicating "universal acclaim". Jean Renoir compared Spielberg's storytelling to Jules Verne and Georges Méliès. Ray Bradbury declared it the greatest science fiction film ever made. David Thomson wrote that "Close Encounters had a flawless wonder, such that it might be the first film ever made" calling it "a tribute to the richness of human imagination" and "as close to a mystical experience as a major film has come, but it's the mysticism of common sense... The movie could have been naive and sentimental—it was inspired by Disney—but Spielberg never relinquishes his practicality and his eye for everyday detail."

=== Reissues and home media ===
Versions
Release date	Version Description	Notes	Runtime
11-16-1977	Original Theatrical Version		135 minutes
08-03-1980	Special Edition	Adds SS Cotopaxi; and Mothership interior	132 minutes
05-12-1998	Collector's Edition/Director's Cut	Removes Mothership interior	137 minutes

On the final cut privilege, Spielberg was dissatisfied with the film. Columbia Pictures was experiencing financial problems, and depending on this film to save their company. He explained: "I wanted to have another six months to finish off this film, and release it in summer 1978. They told me they needed this film out immediately. Anyway, Close Encounters was a huge financial success and I told them I wanted to make my own director's cut. They agreed on the condition that I show the inside of the mothership so they could have something to hang a [reissue marketing] campaign on. I never should have shown the inside of the mothership."

In 1979, Columbia gave Spielberg $1.5 million to produce what became the Special Edition. Spielberg added seven minutes of new and previously discarded footage, but also deleted or shortened various existing scenes by ten minutes, so that its 132-minute runtime is three minutes shorter than the original release. The Special Edition features several new character development scenes, the discovery of the SS Cotopaxi in the Gobi Desert, and a view of the inside of the mothership. Close Encounters of the Third Kind: The Special Edition was released on August 3, 1980, making a further $15.7 million, accumulating a final $303.7 million box office gross. Roger Ebert "thought the original film was an astonishing achievement, capturing the feeling of awe and wonder we have when considering the likelihood of life beyond the Earth. ... This new version ... is, quite simply, a better film ... Why didn't Spielberg make it this good the first time?"

The 1980 Special Edition was the only version officially available for many years on VHS. It was RCA/Columbia Pictures Home Video's biggest selling title with sales of 60,000 in its first three years of release in the United States. Then, in 1990, The Criterion Collection offered two versions for LaserDisc, one a variant of the original 1977 edition (with subtle edits made by Spielberg which became the syndicated television version), the other the Special Edition (programmed by the viewer using the LaserDisc player's remote features that predate the seamless branching of DVDs). This triple-disc LaserDisc set also includes an interactive Making Close Encounters documentary featuring interviews with Spielberg and other cast and crew involved with the film, and stills and script excerpts. In 1993, the Special Edition was released on VHS and LaserDisc with no further release for 14 years.

Vincent Misiano reviewed Close Encounters: The Special Edition in Ares Magazine #5 and commented that "Artists in other media have always had the luxury of returning to a piece, reworking and refining it. For various reasons, money first among them, this opportunity has rarely been afforded to filmmakers. Steven Spielberg has been given the chance and used it well."

On May 12, 1998, Spielberg recut Close Encounters again for the Director's Cut, released as simply the "Collector's Edition" on VHS in both pan and scan and letterboxed variants. This version is a re-edit of the original 1977 release with some elements of the 1980 Special Edition, but omits the mothership interior scenes as Spielberg said they should have remained a mystery. The director's cut is the longest release of the film at 137 minutes, two minutes longer than the theatrical version and five minutes longer than the Special Edition. A widescreen LaserDisc release of the Collector's Edition, on July 14, 1998, includes a new 101-minute documentary, The Making of Close Encounters, which was produced in 1997 and features interviews with Spielberg, the main cast, and notable crew members. Many other alternative versions were made for network and syndicated television, and the Criterion LaserDisc version. Some of these combined all released material from the 1977 and 1980 versions. However, most of these versions were not edited by Spielberg, who regards the Collector's Edition as his definitive version. The Collector's Edition was given a limited release as part of a roadshow featuring select films to celebrate Columbia Pictures's 75th anniversary in 1999. It was the first time this version of the film had been shown theatrically. This was once again released in theaters on September 1, 2017, in tribute to the film's 40th anniversary. It made $1.8 million in the weekend ($2.3 million over the four-day Labor Day holiday), pushing its career global gross to over $306 million worldwide.

Close Encounters was released on DVD on May 29, 2001, in a two-disc Collector's Edition set that contains only the director's cut. This set contains several extra features, including the 1997 documentary, a featurette from 1977, trailers, and deleted scenes that includes the mothership interior from the 1980 Special Edition. A single-disc DVD edition was released on August 27, 2002. In tribute to the film's 30th anniversary, Sony Pictures released it on DVD and Blu-ray in 2007. For the first time, all three versions were packaged together. Then in 2017, in honor of its 40th anniversary, the film was given a 4K restoration of the original camera negative. Following the theatrical re-release of the director's cut, the film was released in 4K and Blu-ray with all three versions given the same 4K treatment.

=== Accolades ===
Award	Category	Nominee(s)	Result	Ref.
Academy Awards	Best Director	Steven Spielberg	Nominated	
Academy Awards	Best Supporting Actress	Melinda Dillon	Nominated	
Academy Awards	Best Art Direction	Art Direction: Joe Alves and Dan Lomino, Set Decoration: Phil Abramson	Nominated	
Academy Awards	Best Cinematography	Vilmos Zsigmond	Won	
Academy Awards	Best Film Editing	Michael Kahn	Nominated	
Academy Awards	Best Original Score	John Williams	Nominated	
Academy Awards	Best Sound	Robert Knudson, Robert J. Glass, Don MacDougall and Gene Cantamessa	Nominated	
Academy Awards	Best Visual Effects	Roy Arbogast, Douglas Trumbull, Matthew Yuricich, Gregory Jein and Richard Yuricich	Nominated	
Academy Awards	Special Achievement Academy Award (for "Sound Effects Editing")	Frank Warner	Won	
American Cinema Editors Awards	Best Edited Feature Film	Michael Kahn	Nominated	
British Academy Film Awards	Best Film	Steven Spielberg	Nominated	
British Academy Film Awards	Best Direction	Steven Spielberg	Nominated	
British Academy Film Awards	Best Actor in a Supporting Role	François Truffaut	Nominated	
British Academy Film Awards	Best Screenplay	Steven Spielberg	Nominated	
British Academy Film Awards	Best Cinematography	Vilmos Zsigmond	Nominated	
British Academy Film Awards	Best Editing	Michael Kahn	Nominated	
British Academy Film Awards	Best Original Music	John Williams	Nominated	
British Academy Film Awards	Best Production Design	Joe Alves	Won	
British Academy Film Awards	Best Sound	Gene Cantamessa, Robert Knudson, Don MacDougall, Robert Glass, Steve Katz, Frank Warner, Richard Oswald, David Horton, Sam Gemette, Gary Gerlich, Chet Slomka and Neil Burrow	Nominated	
David di Donatello Awards	Best Foreign Film	Steven Spielberg	Won	
Directors Guild of America Awards	Outstanding Directorial Achievement in Motion Pictures	Steven Spielberg	Nominated	
Golden Globe Awards	Best Motion Picture – Drama		Nominated	
Golden Globe Awards	Best Director – Motion Picture	Steven Spielberg	Nominated	
Golden Globe Awards	Best Screenplay – Motion Picture	Steven Spielberg	Nominated	
Golden Globe Awards	Best Original Score – Motion Picture	John Williams	Nominated	
Golden Reel Awards	Best Sound Editing – Sound Effects		Won	
Golden Screen Awards			Won	
Grammy Awards	Best Pop Instrumental Performance	Close Encounters of the Third Kind; Zubin Mehta conducting the Los Angeles Philharmonic	Nominated	
Grammy Awards	Best Pop Instrumental Performance	Close Encounters of the Third Kind – John Williams	Nominated	
Grammy Awards	Best Instrumental Composition	"Theme from Close Encounters of the Third Kind" – John Williams	Won	
Grammy Awards	Best Album of Original Score Written for a Motion Picture or a Television Special	Close Encounters of the Third Kind – John Williams	Won	
Hugo Awards	Best Dramatic Presentation	Steven Spielberg	Nominated	
International Film Music Critics Association Awards	Best Re-Release of a Previously Existing Score	John Williams	Won	
International Film Music Critics Association Awards	Best New Release, Re-Release or Re-Recording of an Existing Score	John Williams, Mike Matessino and Jim Titus	Nominated	
Japan Academy Film Prize	Outstanding Foreign Language Film		Nominated	
Korean Association of Film Critics Awards	Best Foreign Film	Steven Spielberg	Won	
National Board of Review Awards	Top Ten Films		5th Place	
National Board of Review Awards	Special Citation – Outstanding Special Effects		Won	
National Film Preservation Board	National Film Registry		Inducted	
National Society of Film Critics Awards	Best Film		3rd Place	
National Society of Film Critics Awards	Best Director	Steven Spielberg	2nd Place	
New York Film Critics Circle Awards	Best Film		Runner-up	
New York Film Critics Circle Awards	Best Director	Steven Spielberg	Runner-up	
Online Film & Television Association Awards	Hall of Fame – Motion Picture		Inducted	
Saturn Awards (1977)	Best Science Fiction Film		Nominated	
Saturn Awards (1977)	Best Director	Steven Spielberg	Won (Note: Tied with George Lucas for Star Wars.)	
Saturn Awards (1977)	Best Actor	Richard Dreyfuss	Nominated	
Saturn Awards (1977)	Best Actress	Melinda Dillon	Nominated	
Saturn Awards (1977)	Best Supporting Actress	Teri Garr	Nominated	
Saturn Awards (1977)	Best Writing	Steven Spielberg	Nominated	
Saturn Awards (1977)	Best Make-up	Bob Westmoreland, Thomas R. Burman and Carlo Rambaldi	Nominated	
Saturn Awards (1977)	Best Music	John Williams	Won	
Saturn Awards (1977)	Best Special Effects	Douglas Trumbull	Nominated	
Saturn Awards (2001)	Best DVD Classic Film Release		Nominated	
Saturn Awards (2007)	Best DVD Special Edition Release		Nominated	
Turkish Film Critics Association Awards	Best Foreign Film		7th Place	
Writers Guild of America Awards	Best Drama – Written Directly for the Screen	Steven Spielberg	Nominated	

==== American Film Institute Lists ====
- AFI's 100 Years...100 Movies: #64
- AFI's 100 Years...100 Thrills: #31
- AFI's 100 Years...100 Cheers: #58

== Legacy ==
Observers credited Close Encounters for launching the reemergence of a large market for science fiction films in the 1980s alongside Star Wars (1977) and Superman (1978). In 1985, Spielberg donated $100,000 to the Planetary Society for Megachannel ExtraTerrestrial Assay.

Shortly after the film's release in late 1977, Spielberg considered either a sequel or prequel, but decided against it. He explained, "The army's knowledge and ensuing cover-up is so subterranean that it would take a creative screen story, perhaps someone else making the picture and giving it the equal time it deserves."

When asked in 1980 to select a single "master image" that summed up his film career, Spielberg chose the shot of Barry opening his living room door to see the blazing orange light from the UFO. "That was beautiful but awful light, just like fire coming through the doorway. [Barry's] very small, and it's a very large door, and there's a lot of promise or danger outside that door." In 2007, Close Encounters was deemed "culturally, historically, or aesthetically significant" by the United States Library of Congress and was added to the National Film Registry for preservation. In American Film Institute polls, Close Encounters has been voted the 64th-greatest American film, the 31st-most thrilling, and the 58th-most inspiring. It was also nominated for the top 10 science fiction films in AFI's 10 Top 10 and the tenth-anniversary edition of the 100 Movies list. The score by John Williams was nominated for AFI's 100 Years of Film Scores.

In 2011, ABC aired a primetime special, Best in Film: The Greatest Movies of Our Time, that counted down the best films chosen by fans based on results of a poll conducted by ABC and People magazine. Close Encounters of the Third Kind was selected as the #5 Best Sci-Fi Film. The Guardian also selected the film as the 11th best Sci-Fi and fantasy film of all time. In 2024, Close Encounters of the Third Kind was included in Rolling Stone's "The 150 Best Science Fiction Movies of All Time" list at #3.

Many prominent directors have cited Close Encounters as one of their favorites, among them Stanley Kubrick, Edgar Wright, Bong Joon-ho, Spike Lee, Denis Villeneuve, Guillermo del Toro, Christopher Nolan, Greta Gerwig, Andrew Stanton, and Patrick Read Johnson. Stephen King named it one of his ten favorite movies.

== See also ==
- List of films featuring extraterrestrials
