= Richard Yuricich =

American visual effects artist

- Born: December 1942 (age 83); Lorain, Ohio, US
- Occupation: Special effects artist
- Family: Matthew Yuricich (brother)

Richard Yuricich (born December 1942) is a special visual effects artist. He is the brother of Matthew Yuricich, also a special effects artist. Yuricich is of Croatian descent. His father emigrated to America from his native Josipdol in Lika. He has been nominated for an Academy Award three times.

== Oscar Nominations ==
All 3 are in the category of Best Visual Effects

- 50th Academy Awards-Nominated for Close Encounters of the Third Kind, nomination shared with Roy Arbogast, Gregory Jein, Douglas Trumbull and Matthew Yuricich. Lost to Star Wars.
- 52nd Academy Awards-Nominated for Star Trek: The Motion Picture, nomination shared with John Dykstra, Grant McCune, David K. Stewart, Robert Swarthe and Douglas Trumbull. Lost to Alien.
- 55th Academy Awards-Nominated for Blade Runner, nomination shared with David Dryer and Douglas Trumbull. Lost to E.T. the Extra-Terrestrial. .

== Selected filmography ==
- Non-Stop (2014)
- The Book of Eli (2010)
- Mission: Impossible 2 (2000)
- Event Horizon (1997)
- Under Siege 2: Dark Territory (1995)
- Bill & Ted's Bogus Journey (1991)
- Blade Runner (1982)
- Star Trek: The Motion Picture (1979)
- Close Encounters of the Third Kind (1977)
- 2001: A Space Odyssey (1968)
