= Douglas Trumbull =

American film director, special effects designer (1942–2022)

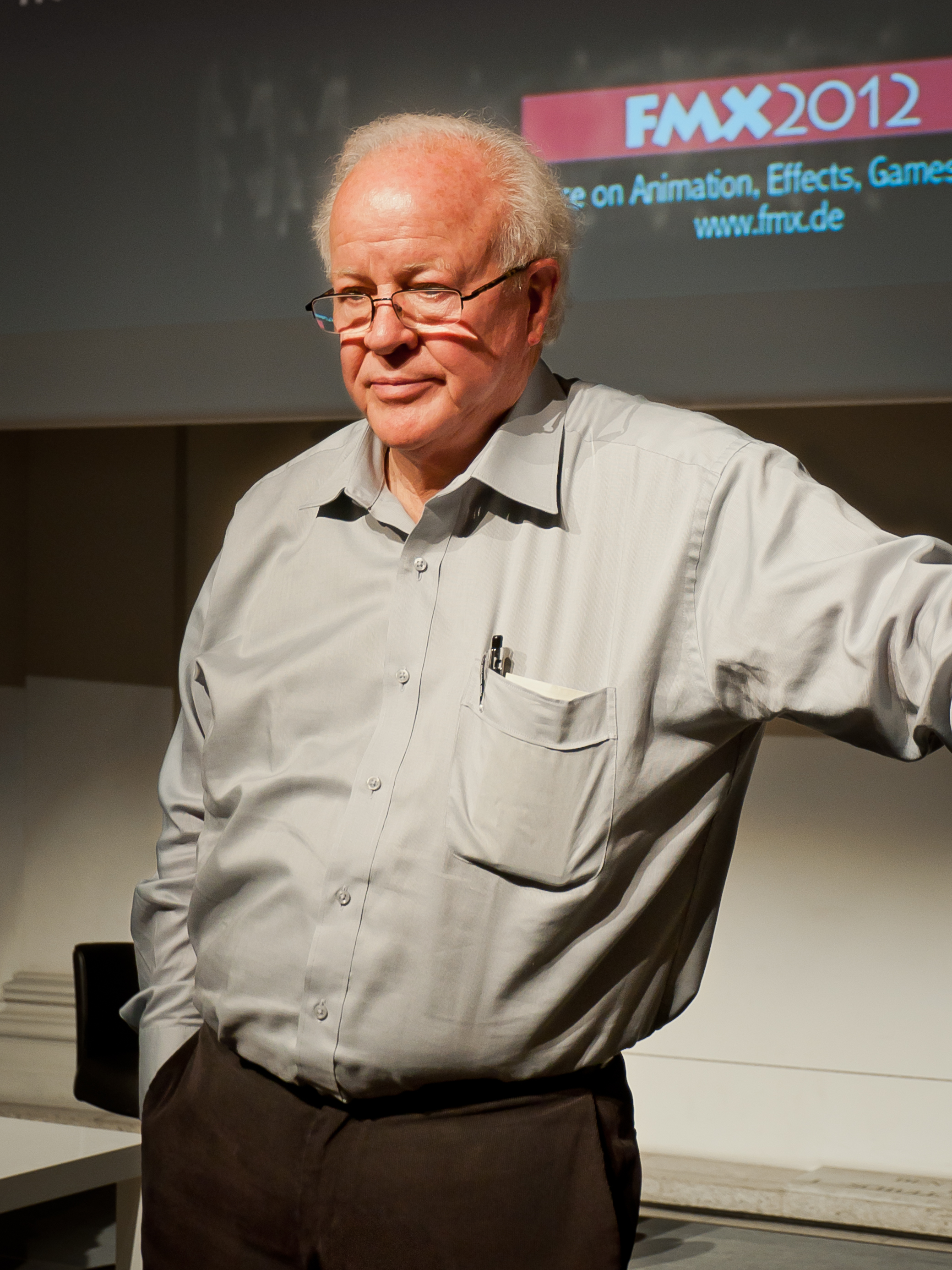
- Trumbull at the annual FMX Conference in 2012
- Born: Douglas Hunt Trumbull; April 8, 1942; Los Angeles, California, U.S.
- Died: February 7, 2022 (aged 79); Albany, New York, U.S.
- Occupations: Film director, producer, writer, special effects supervisor, inventor
- Years active: 1964–2022
- Children: 2
- Father: Donald Trumbull

Douglas Hunt Trumbull (/ˈtrʌmbəl/; April 8, 1942 – February 7, 2022) was an American film director and visual effects supervisor, who pioneered innovative methods in special effects. He created scenes for 2001: A Space Odyssey, Close Encounters of the Third Kind, Star Trek: The Motion Picture, Blade Runner and The Tree of Life, and directed the movies Silent Running and Brainstorm.

== Early life ==
Trumbull was born in Los Angeles. His father was an aerospace engineer who had briefly worked in Hollywood creating visual effects for the 1939 movie The Wizard of Oz; his mother, who died when Trumbull was 7, was an artist. Growing up in Inglewood, California as a child, he liked to construct mechanical and electrical devices such as crystal-set radios, and enjoyed watching alien invasion movies. He initially wanted to be an architect, leading him to take classes in illustration. He studied technical drawing at El Camino Junior College and joined the Screen Cartoonists Guild upon graduating. Hollywood initially rejected his portfolio of spaceships and planetary drawings. However, his abilities in creating photorealistic art led to a job at Graphic Films, which produced short films for NASA and the Air Force.

== Career ==
=== 1960s ===
Douglas Trumbull's early work was at Graphic Films in Los Angeles. The small animation and graphic arts studio produced a film called To the Moon and Beyond about spaceflight for the 1964 New York World's Fair. Trumbull, the son of a mechanical engineer and an artist, worked at Graphic Films as an illustrator and airbrush artist. He painted a rotating spiral galaxy, and using a fish eye lens, projected the film onto a custom-built dome. The effect was ground-breaking for its time and the film caught the attention of director Stanley Kubrick, who was beginning work on the project that would become 2001: A Space Odyssey. Kubrick hired director Con Pederson from Graphic Films and the company was to work on visual effects for the film. When Kubrick decided to move all production to England, he cancelled the contract with Graphic Films. Trumbull wanted to keep working on the film as he had already done considerable pre-production work, so he cold-called Kubrick after obtaining the director's home phone number from Pederson. Kubrick hired Trumbull and flew him to London for the production of 2001. Trumbull's first task was to create the dozens of animations seen in the data display screens in the Aries moon shuttle and the Discovery. They looked like computer graphics, but they were created by photographing and animating reproductions of charts and graphs from technical publications. Trumbull initially created the shots using a number of Rube Goldberg-like contraptions he built with gears and motors ordered from a scientific equipment supply house. Kubrick gave the young effects technician creative freedom and encouragement: "He would say ... 'What do you need to do it?' and I would have complete carte blanche, which was wild as a young guy", Trumbull recalled. "I was 23–24 when I started the movie, and was 25 by the time I was doing the Star Gate. He would say, 'What do you need?' and I'd say, 'Well, I need to go into town and buy some weird bearings and some stuff' and he would send me off to town in his Bentley, with a driver, into London. It was great!"

Trumbull's responsibilities and talents grew as the production continued, and he became one of four special effects supervisors on the film (the others were fellow Graphic Films alumnus Con Pederson, along with Tom Howard and Wally Veevers.) Trumbull's most memorable contribution was the development of the slit-scan photography process, used in the "Stargate" sequence. "...I just happened to be in the right place at the right time ... We were struggling with the Star Gate. Nobody knew what a Star Gate was; but, I came up with some ideas that I didn't even know at the time were based on some things I was learning as a young guy about street photography and weird photographic techniques...". He created the Stargate by building a 6ft-tall sheet of rotatable metal and cut a narrow slit in it. The sheet was placed in front of a 12ft-long backlit glass panel, through which lighting patterns were shone. With a long camera exposure, the kaleidoscope of lights appeared to be darting towards the camera from a single point.

Trumbull and Kubrick wanted the audience to feel like they were on the adventure themselves. This approach eventually led to the Imax system of high resolution projection, which Trumbull helped to develop. Working on 2001 hooked Trumbull on the concept of producing immersive film experiences on huge screens, at a time when the industry was moving towards the multiplexing of theatres with smaller screens.

Although Trumbull's association with Kubrick was a huge boost for his career, he swore afterwards that he would "never work for someone else again", in part because Kubrick "was a hell of a taskmaster... his level of quality-control bordered on perfectionism."

The film earned an Oscar for best special effects, but the award went solely to Kubrick, with Trumbull receiving none of the accolade for his work. This led to threats of legal action and the two men did not speak for a decade. Trumbull said after Kubrick's death that Kubrick "was a genius", someone whom Trumbull missed terribly.

In 1969 Trumbull was filming the annual Flying Saucer Convention in Giant Rock, California. This evolved into a full-length project initially called Giant Rock, Rutabaga Deluxe, and then Saturation 70: An Ecological Horror Fantasy. The star of the film was a five-year-old Julian Jones, who was the son of Brian Jones, of Rolling Stones fame. The story involved Jones losing his mother in a giant garbage dump and wandering a desolate planet looking for her, while being menaced by gas-masked garbage men and helped by a fairy godmother in a sequined cowgirl creation by Nudie. Some footage includes a battle with a Green Beret and a Viet Cong in a supermarket. Trumbull's partner on the film was Anthony Foutz. A company called Dimension V took over backing of the film.

=== 1970–1974 ===
Having returned to Hollywood, Trumbull set up his own company and subsequently bid on the job to produce special effects for the science-fiction film The Andromeda Strain. ("I was a young guy and very naive", he later recalled, "And I seriously underbid the job – I had no idea what these things were supposed to cost. I nearly went bankrupt as a result!") Trumbull and associate James Shourt produced dozens of shots, including the "electron microscope" pictures of the Andromeda organism and various on-screen readouts. Though many of these looked like computer graphics, they were created using techniques Trumbull had used for 2001. Author Michael Crichton and director Robert Wise were much impressed by Trumbull's work.

Trumbull's participation and success on Andromeda set him up to direct the 1971 film Silent Running, with a script based on his original treatment: Earth's last great forests are preserved and sent into space inside huge geodesic domes, in the hope that one day they can be returned to an Earth that can once again sustain them. When orders are issued by faceless bureaucrats to abandon and destroy the domes, the ship's botanist (Bruce Dern) rebels and takes over the ship, aided by three non-anthropomorphic "drone" robots. He steers the ship away from the fleet and hides among the rings of Saturn, out of communication, attempting to keep the forests in good health, assisted by the drones who follow him around like pets.

Silent Running was produced by Universal on a shoestring budget of one million dollars, one-tenth the budget of 2001. The film used a number of special effects techniques that Trumbull had helped develop. The spacecraft interiors were shot aboard the mothballed aircraft carrier, USS Valley Forge, which lent its name to the movie spacecraft. Trumbull was not originally slated to direct, but as the start of production loomed he became the obvious choice. (Other newcomers included the script writing team of Deric Washburn and Michael Cimino, who would later collaborate on The Deer Hunter, along with writer Steven Bochco of Hill Street Blues and L.A. Law fame.)

When Silent Running was released, insiders were astonished that the finished film had been produced for so little money. Lead actor Bruce Dern compared Trumbull's creative vision to that of Alfred Hitchcock, with whom Dern had also worked. Trumbull was seen as one of Hollywood's up and coming young directors.

Although a critical success, Silent Running was a flop at the box office. Trumbull recalled that "It was just a great experience for me as a film maker, but I didn't know that I was part of an experiment by Universal Studios... to see if it was possible to have a movie survive on word of mouth alone without an advertising campaign." It was not, but Silent Running's environmental message struck a chord, and the movie has since become a cult classic.

After Silent Running, Trumbull developed a number of movie projects, but a series of misfortunes and bad luck kept them from getting beyond the initial development stage. One project nearly did get into production, and was already being cast when it was abruptly scuttled – the investor had decided to abandon the movie business and build a Las Vegas casino instead. Trumbull described this period of his career as "development hell". Unable to live on development fees alone and needing money, Trumbull returned to creating special effects, including some uncredited work using blue screen techniques on the 1974 film The Towering Inferno, a huge commercial hit.

=== 1975–1980 ===
In 1975, Trumbull turned down an offer to provide the effects for George Lucas' Star Wars due to his commitment to contribute effects to Close Encounters of the Third Kind in 1977. In 1976, he was approached by producer Jerome Zeitman, who had bought the rights to Roger Zelazny's Damnation Alley, but also turned down the work due to prior commitments. In late 1978, Trumbull's Future General Corporation, a research/special effects house that was funded by Gulf + Western and Paramount Pictures, was offered the job to produce the special effects for Star Trek: The Motion Picture. Trumbull, already deeply involved in Close Encounters, refused, wanting instead to focus his efforts on his patented Showscan process, a high-speed, large-format movie process that provided unprecedented visual clarity. Paramount awarded the contract to effects house Robert Abel and Associates, and in a move seen by some as payback for Trumbull's refusal to take on the project, all but shuttered Future General.

Robert Abel had produced many high-end, visually advanced commercials for clients such as 7-Up, but it soon became apparent that their choice of technology, which featured software-controlled camera rigs and graphics imaging systems very advanced for the day, simply couldn't scale up to the volume of material required. In August 1978, with rumors of an impending meltdown at Abel swirling, Trumbull approached Paramount offering to step in and do the effects with partner Richard Yuricich. Paramount declined, hoping that Abel could still work a miracle.

Early in 1979, and with principal photography nearly finished and a December release date looming, Abel was fired after failing to produce even a few seconds of usable footage. Paramount approached Trumbull to take over effects production, which Trumbull did after securing an agreement to be released from his contract at Paramount upon completion of the film. "At the time", he recalled, "I think they would have entertained anyone who could have pulled them out of the jam." Trumbull reassembled his Future General team, rebuilt his facility which Paramount had nearly gutted, and with a mere six months to create the hundreds of effects shots needed, worked virtually around the clock for months. His team made the date, but their in-house battle cry became "... crop it, flop it, or drop it!" (That is, re-use part of an existing scene, take an existing scene and "flop" it over so that a right-to-left shot of the ship now plays the other way, or "drop" the shot from the script altogether.)

The model of the Enterprise, already built by the time Trumbull's team took over, proved especially tricky. While the model of Discovery in 2001 was over 50 feet (15 m.) long and featured a wealth of detail (from parts gleaned from, among other things, hundreds of plastic model tank kits), the model of the Enterprise was only seven feet (2 m.) in length, which severely limited the photographic possibilities. Other compromises had to be overcome. Trumbull had several ideas for unconventional effects – such as a modified slitscan technique to produce fantastic streaks when the Enterprise went into warp drive, but many had to be shelved due to time constraints. Trumbull also made several contributions to the story line, in collaboration once again with his Andromeda Strain director Robert Wise.

As Trumbull told Wolfram Hannemann of in70mm.com, "There were as many shots [in the movie] as Close Encounters and Star Wars combined ... There were 650 shots, which had to be completed in six months ... and we all worked 24 hours a day for six months. Seven days a week, around the clock, to get that movie done ... I ended up in the hospital – it was a major recovery. I had ulcers, all kinds of exhaustion because I was working seven days a week, almost living in the studio, not getting enough sleep."

=== 1980–1990s ===
In 1981 Trumbull directed the special effects for the Ridley Scott film Blade Runner. By this time Trumbull had sworn off doing special effects for other directors, but was lured to the project by the opportunity to work with Scott, and a chance to create something other than sterile, grey and white spacecraft. "One of the things that appealed to me about the project", Trumbull recalled in an interview in Cinefex magazine, "was that it was NOT a space movie. I'm just real tired of doing spaceships against star backgrounds." Indeed, the iconic images of a polluted, dystopian Los Angeles, looking more like an oil refinery than a metropolis, and complete with building-sized electronic billboards and a bulbous blimp circling overhead advertising "Off World" job opportunities became the film's visual trademarks.

Trumbull did not complete Blade Runner, (David Dryer took over as special effects supervisor) leaving the film as agreed about halfway through to concentrate on pre-production for his next directing effort, Brainstorm, a story of two brilliant scientists who develop a revolutionary device to record and vicariously experience other people's feelings and perceptions, a device the military tries to steal for its own purposes.

Brainstorm was to be a showcase for Trumbull's "Showscan" process, which used special cameras and projectors to capture and project 70 mm film at 60 frames per second. At the last minute the Showscan process was not used, because theatre owners balked at the idea of installing expensive new projection equipment. The film was shot conventionally at 24 frames per second on 35 mm film, though Trumbull continued his process of shooting effects work in 70 mm. "In movies people often do flashbacks and point-of-view shots as a gauzy, mysterious, distant kind of image", Trumbull recalled, "And I wanted to do just the opposite, which was to make the material of the mind even more real and high-impact than 'reality'".

The film was nearly scuttled by the mysterious drowning death of Natalie Wood during a break in production. MGM immediately shut down production and initially wanted to dump Brainstorm (and collect the insurance on the unfinished film). Trumbull, though perhaps bereft by the death of Natalie, reasoned that the film would be finished after filming just a few more scenes. Lawyers and insurance companies battled over whether to even complete the film. The movie was finally finished two years later when the insurance company supplied the money to finish production. Trumbull had pushed all the while for the studio to finish and release his movie. "I can do this", Trumbull recalled in an interview with GreenCine, "I've got all the coverage ... All you need to do is let me in the editing room and I'll show you. They said, 'No, you can't come back, we don't want you in the cutting room, you can't finish this movie.'" Because of his determination to finish his film, Trumbull became persona non grata at MGM in the process. Eventually released on a small number of screens and with little publicity (though Trumbull recalled in the Greencine interview that the film became "Quote, Natalie Wood's last film, unquote") Brainstorm was well received critically but a commercial failure at the box office.

Exhausted from his battles with the Hollywood system ("The movie business is so totally screwed up that I just don't have the energy to invest three or four years in a feature film"), Trumbull retreated to the Berkshire Hills of western Massachusetts, to escape "the lawyers, the insurance agents, the creeps", redirecting his career away from traditional Hollywood projects and concentrating instead on developing new technology for movie production, and for the exhibition industry and theme-park rides, such as the very first flight-simulator ride, Tour of the Universe, and the Back to the Future Ride at Universal Studios Theme Parks. Until recently, Trumbull's Showscan technology could be seen on a theme-park type ride at the Luxor Hotel in Las Vegas.

In 1994, Trumbull was briefly a Vice Chairman of IMAX Corporation and President of its Ridefilm division through his involvement in the simultaneous combination and takeover of the Canadian-based private company Imax Corp. and Trumbull Co.

=== 2000–2018 ===
Trumbull spent nearly two decades in the Berkshire hills of western Massachusetts, starting and running a series of companies involved in effects production and innovation.

In 2010, Trumbull used social media to publicize a video on Vimeo and YouTube demonstrating an invention intended to cap the BP oil spill with a strong vacuum seal. Although the video "went viral" almost immediately, Trumbull never heard from BP or any of the US government agencies struggling to contain the spill, which left him bemused and mildly annoyed. "I didn't do it with the hope of compensation", he later said, "I did it because I thought it was the moral thing to do."

After nearly thirty years away from Hollywood, Trumbull contributed to special effects work on Terrence Malick's 2011 film The Tree of Life. Malick, reportedly a Trumbull fan, approached him about the effects work and mentioned that he did not like the look of computer-generated effects. Reportedly Trumbull asked, "Why not do it the way we did it on 2001?" Recent compositing programs such as Nuke allow practical scenes shot on film to be combined with fewer of the head-aches of "traditional" effects work, such as shooting multiple camera passes on a single piece of film, matte passes, and the like. Trumbull eventually signed on as special effects consultant, working with the film's effects supervisor, Dan Glass. Many of the "organic" effects processes used in 2001 and Close Encounters were resurrected, such as photographing chemical interactions in petri dishes and releasing paints into water tanks. "It was a working environment that's almost impossible to come by these days", Trumbull told The Guardian newspaper in July 2011. "Terry wanted to create the opportunity for the unexpected to occur before the camera, then make something of that. He didn't want to use a very stringent design process, he wanted the unexpected phenomenon to occur – and use that."

In March 2011, director James Cameron announced plans to film his next Avatar-type 3D feature in a digital version of Showscan. Cameron has been pushing for movie theatres to adopt higher frame-rates to maintain the 3D effect during scenes involving high-speed motion (such as explosions). At twenty-four frames per second the 3D effect breaks down, while at forty-eight or sixty frames per second it is maintained. Sixty frames per second is difficult to achieve with conventional film because of the stress on the medium itself; recording sixty frames per second using a digital camera is commonplace.

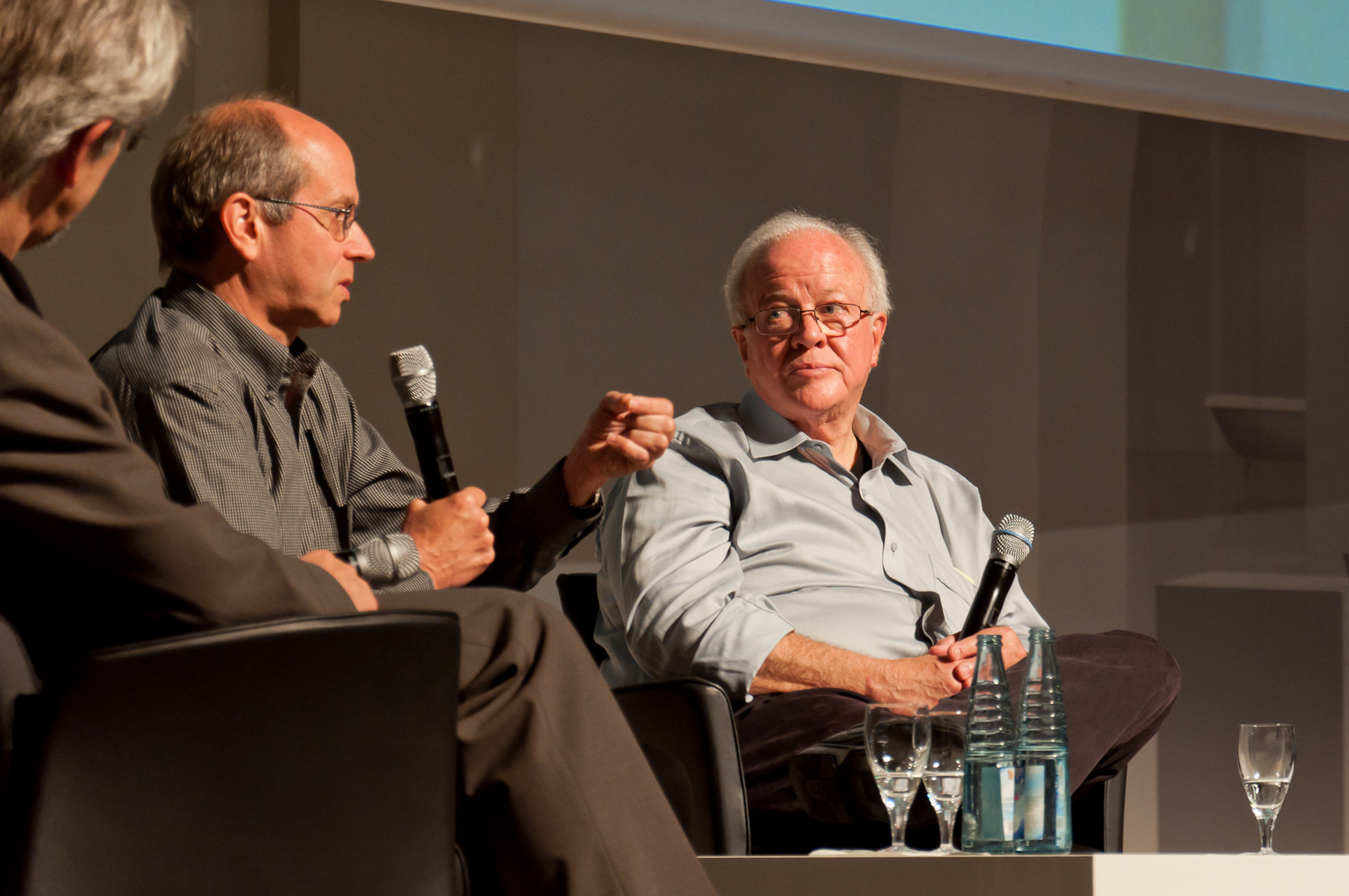
Trumbull discussing frame rates with Ray Feeney (left) and Bill Desowitz at FMX 2012

In 2012 Trumbull said he was working on a new science-fiction project that he claimed is "way beyond anything that Peter Jackson and James Cameron have been doing", which will probably be shot with a camera capable of recording 120 frames per second, twice the speed of its ancestor, Showscan.

Trumbull was a guest speaker at the Massachusetts Production Coalition in February 2013.

Since 2013 Trumbull maintained a workshop and studio on his property in the Berkshire hills of Massachusetts where he continued to develop new tools for film-makers. He often traveled to film screenings and seminars and was enjoying a resurgence of his celebrity among film and visual effects enthusiasts. Trumbull seemed grateful for the recognition and reverence accorded by his followers. "They really keep me going", he told The Australian newspaper in February 2011. "They reinforce some enthusiasm about my work. It's very hard to keep me going, because the setbacks [were] really tragic and difficult." When asked by a reporter how he had managed to persevere in the face of setbacks, Trumbull laughed and replied that he didn't know, and "Maybe I'm just out of my mind!"

In 2014 Trumbull announced that he had developed a new digital capture and projection system called Magi. It shoots and projects native 3D in 4K at 120 fps, using an innovative technique he called "cadence", which had never been used in previous 3D systems: "We were shooting 60 [frames] per eye, projector was going 120—left eye, right eye, left eye, right eye. You're shooting the same way you're going to project it. And that's when this magic happens. It's only one flash per frame, and the sequence is actually temporally correct. There are in fact 120 different positions. Anything that moves in front of the camera is going to have 120 different positions." That year he also produced a short dramatic film, UFOTOG, to highlight the capabilities of the Magi system. The story deals with a man who has developed a sophisticated 3D photographic system to track UFOs and prove their existence, despite interference from a shadowy government agency. The film has been shown at film festivals and industry conferences and to filmmakers and studio executives.

In 2016, he told Science & Film, "I am planning on making a feature-length movie that will be almost entirely miniatures, but it will be photorealistic, full-scale, epic in quality, and have the kind of things that I like about Blade Runner and 2001."

In 2018, Trumbull provided the visual effects for and executive produced the movie The Man Who Killed Hitler and Then the Bigfoot. The same year, he participated in the documentary Trumbull Land (Grégory Wallet, 2018) devoted to him and his universe.

=== Honors ===
Trumbull was twice honored by the Society of Motion Picture and Television Engineers (SMPTE). Most recently, he received the Progress Medal in recognition of his numerous contributions to photographic processes and technologies in visual effects (VFX) and HFR cinematography. Trumbull conducted pioneering biometric research on audience response to HFR imaging and developed a novel cinematic process using 65mm film at 60 frames per second that resulted in a "Giant Screen" 70mm image with extraordinarily high definition along with smoother and more realistic motion rendering. His work continues to advance stereoscopic 3D and digital HFR imaging including his 120FPS Magi single-camera/single projector "lens-to-lens" system that harnesses existing cameras, post-production tools, and projectors to deliver images and sound that are almost indistinguishable from reality. The Progress Medal is the most prestigious SMPTE award, and it recognizes outstanding technical contributions to the progress of engineering phases of the motion picture, television, or motion-imaging industries. The honor was conferred upon Trumbull at the SMPTE Centennial Gala on October 28, 2016, at the Ray Dolby Ballroom in Hollywood. In 2011, he received the SMPTE Presidential Proclamation, which recognizes individuals of established and outstanding status and reputation in the motion-picture, television, and motion-imaging industries worldwide. Trumbull was honored for his more than 45 years of pioneering work in visual effects photography and groundbreaking innovation in motion picture technologies.

Trumbull was inducted by the Science Fiction Hall of Fame in 2010, citing first his stature as "innovative master of special effects". He has been nominated for Academy Awards on three occasions and has received the American Society of Cinematographer's Lifetime Achievement Award.

Trumbull received the International Press Academy's Tesla award in December 2011, named in honor of Nikola Tesla, an inventor, scientist and engineer, who, Trumbull noted dryly in a runway interview, "Died penniless, after lots of people took credit for his work." He went on to say that he hopes it doesn't turn out that way for him. Trumbull also received the Gordon E. Sawyer Award in February 2012, an honorary Academy Award given to an "individual in the motion picture industry whose technological contributions have brought credit to the industry", as well as the Georges Méliès award from the Visual Effects Society in the same month.

== Personal life and death ==
Trumbull was married three times and had two children. He was in poor health for the last two years of his life, due to complications from a stroke and cancer. He died from mesothelioma at a hospital in Albany, New York, on February 7, 2022, at the age of 79. His ashes were sent into space with those of Majel Barrett and Nichelle Nichols.

== See also ==
- The Starlost – a 1973 TV series for which Trumbull was executive producer
- FMX Conference on Animation, Effects, Games and Interactive Media (German Wikipedia) at the Film Academy Baden-Württemberg
