= Matthew Yuricich =

American special effects artist (1923–2012)

- Born: January 19, 1923; Lorain, Ohio, U.S.
- Died: May 28, 2012 (aged 89); Los Angeles, California, U.S.

Matthew J. Yuricich (January 19, 1923 – May 28, 2012) was an American special effects artist.

== Biography ==
He was born of Croatian immigrant parentage in Lorain, Ohio. His father immigrated to America from his native Josipdol in Gorski Kotar. Yuricich spoke only Croatian when he started grade school. After graduating high school in 1941, he joined the U.S. Navy. He served on the escort carrier USS Nassau, seeing combat in the Pacific Theater.

Before becoming a special effects artist, Yuricich received a bachelor's degree in Fine Arts from Miami University in Oxford, Ohio where he also played football and joined Phi Kappa Tau fraternity. He received Miami's 2006 Distinguished Achievement Award for his career achievements and was a charter member of the Phi Kappa Tau Hall of Fame.

A pre-war friendship with pinup star Betty Grable allowed Yuricich entry into the movie industry after the war. As a matte artist, much of his early studio work was uncredited but included work on Forbidden Planet (1956), North by Northwest and Ben-Hur (both 1959). Some of his later credits are Soylent Green (1973, special photographic effects), Young Frankenstein (1974, uncredited), The China Syndrome, Star Trek: The Motion Picture and 1941 (all in 1979), Blade Runner (1982), Ghostbusters and 2010 (both 1984), Fright Night (1985), Poltergeist II: The Other Side, The Boy Who Could Fly and Solarbabies (all 1986), Masters of the Universe (1987), Die Hard (1988), Field of Dreams (1989), Dances with Wolves (1990) and Harley Davidson and the Marlboro Man (1991).

Yuricich won the 1976 Academy Special Achievement Award for visual effects in the movie Logan's Run. He was nominated for the best visual effects Oscar for his work on Close Encounters of the Third Kind in 1977. His brother is Academy Award-nominated special effects artist Richard Yuricich.
