= Grip (occupation) =

Camera supporting equipment technician

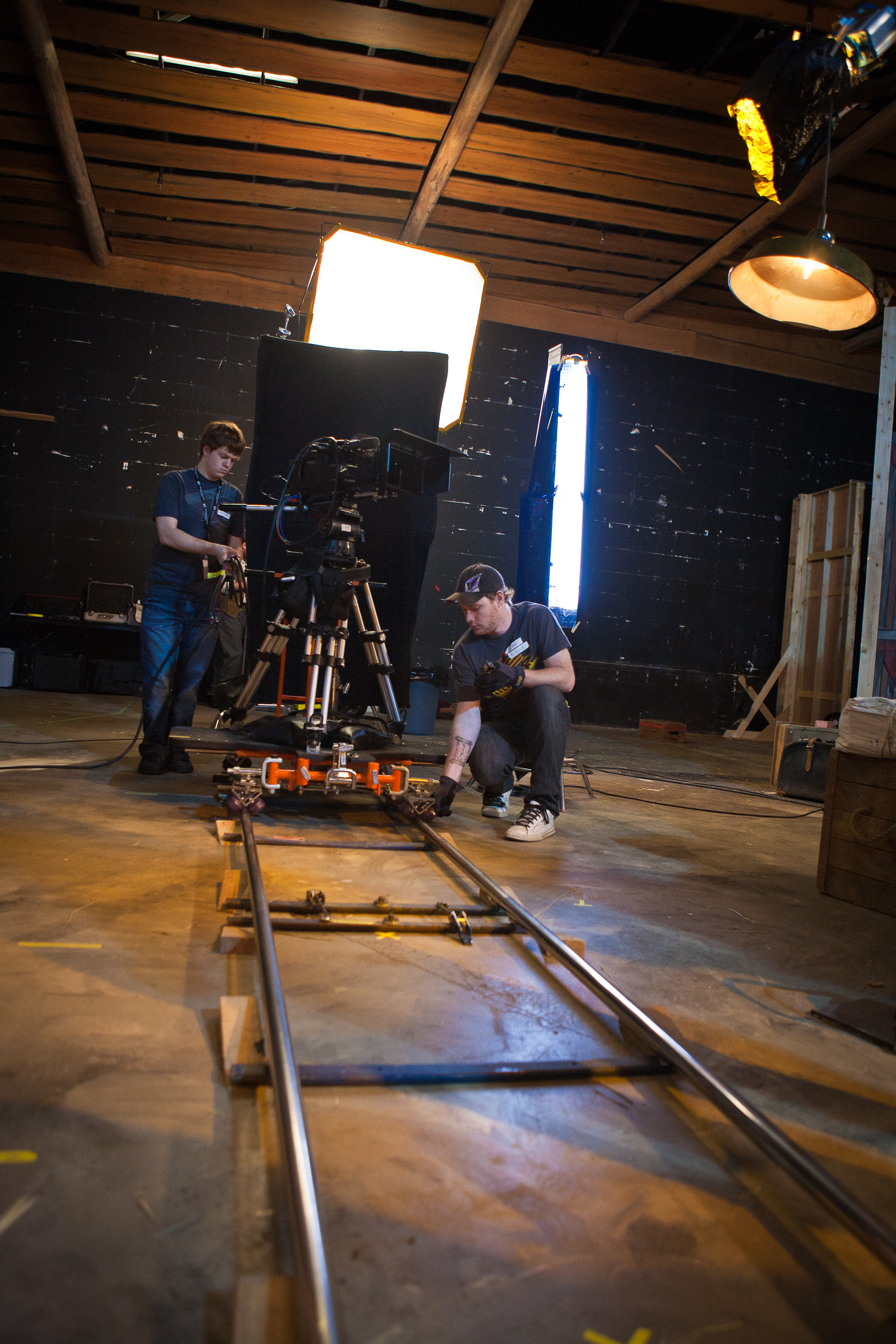
Grips working on a skateboard dolly

In the United States, Canada and the United Kingdom, grips are camera support and equipment technicians in the filmmaking and video production industries. They constitute their own department on a film set and are directed by a key grip. Grips have two main functions: The first is to work closely with the camera department to provide camera support, especially if the camera is mounted to a dolly, crane, or in an unusual position, such as the top of a ladder. Some grips may specialize in operating camera dollies or camera cranes. The second function is to work closely with the electrical department to create lighting set-ups necessary for a shot under the direction of the director of photography.

Grips' responsibility is to build and maintain all the equipment that supports cameras. This equipment, which includes tripods, dollies, tracks, jibs, cranes, and static rigs, is constructed of delicate yet heavy duty parts requiring a high level of experience to operate and move. Every scene in a feature film is shot using one or more cameras, each mounted on highly complex, extremely expensive, heavy duty equipment. Grips assemble this equipment according to meticulous specifications and push, pull, mount or hang it from a variety of settings. The equipment can be as basic as a tripod standing on a studio floor, to hazardous operations such as mounting a camera on a 100 ft crane, or hanging it from a helicopter swooping above a mountain range.

— Media Match Inc.

Good Grips perform a crucial role in ensuring that the artifice of film is maintained, and that camera moves are as seamless as possible. Grips are usually requested by the DoP (Director of Photography) or the camera operator. Although the work is physically demanding and the hours are long, the work can be very rewarding. Many Grips work on both commercials and features.

— Media Match Inc.

In the UK, Australia and most parts of Europe, grips are not involved in lighting. In the "British System", adopted throughout Europe and the Commonwealth (excluding Canada), a grip is solely responsible for camera mounting and support.

The term "grip" is derived from an older term in U.S. theatre where it designated stagehands who moved or picked up scenery.

U.S. grips typically belong to the International Alliance of Theatrical Stage Employees (IATSE). Canadian grips may also belong to IATSE or to Canada's other professional trade unions including Toronto's Nabet 700, or Vancouver's ACFC. British grips usually belong to the Broadcasting, Entertainment, Communications and Theatre Union.

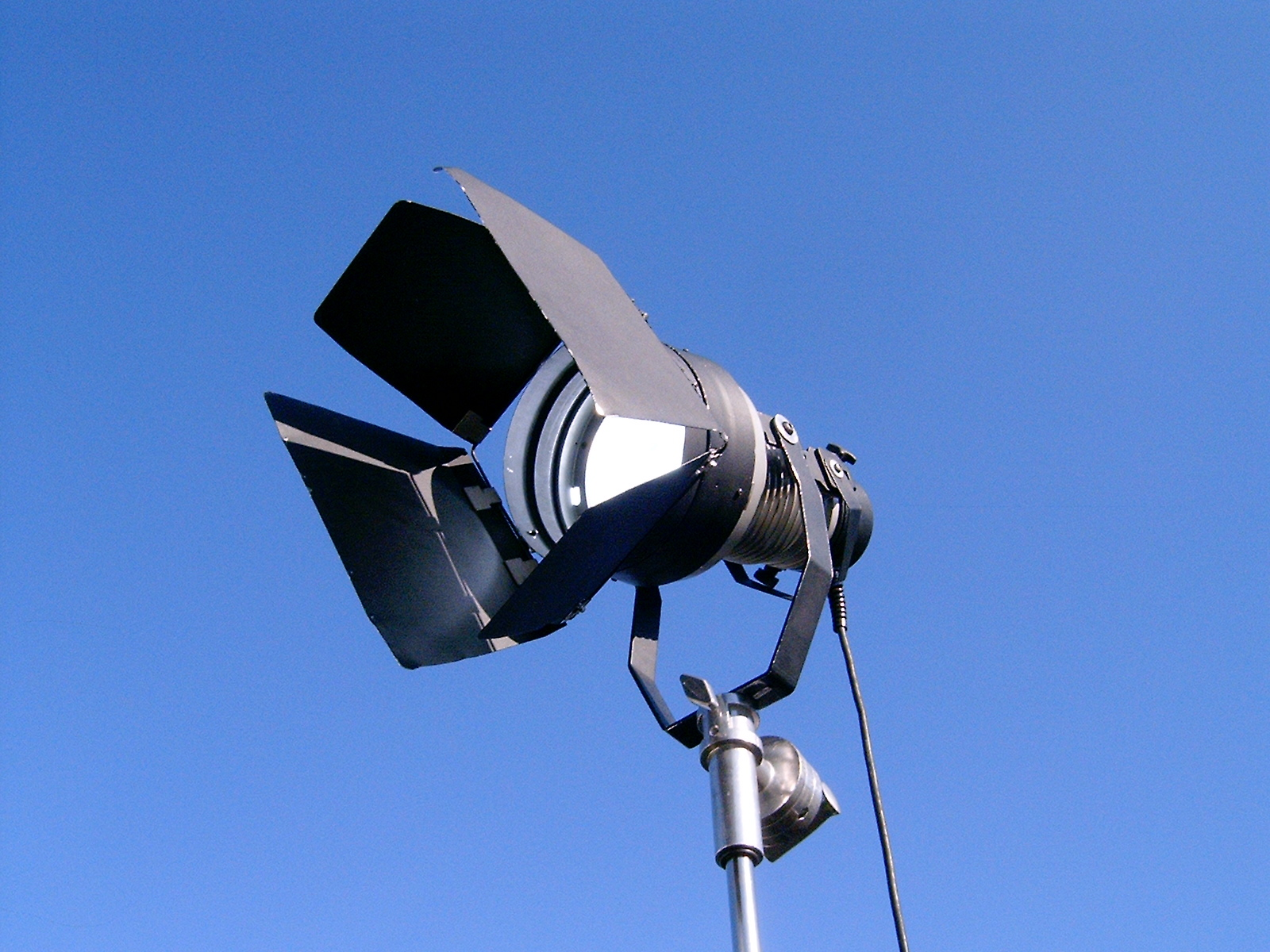
An HMI head on a stand

== Lighting ==
On all union jobs, grips do not touch the lights themselves. The placement of lighting instruments and electric power distribution is handled by the electricians who work under a gaffer. Grips handle all the non-electrical equipment that modifies the light. This work is done by setting stands that hold flags, nets, diffusing materials or other gobos that control the quality, intensity, or shape of the light.

Grips also set "passive fill" which is a term for the reflected light that is "bounced" back onto a subject on the fill or non-key light side. The first choice for most film-makers' fill is a product known in the US as beadboard and called "poly", short for polystyrene, in Europe. It is rigid insulation made for the construction trade, but was adopted by the film trade because of its "true-white" color and "soft" bounce.

Grips may also be called on to set "negative fill", which is the reduction of ambient or non-directional light, such as ambient sunlight, to raise contrast on the subject. This is achieved by setting "solids", made of black fabric, either flags (up to 4' × 4') or rags (6' × 6' or larger) on the non-key light side or wherever the negative fill is desired.

When shooting day exteriors, grips perform similar functions, but with the sun as the primary light source. Grips use overhead frames up to 20' × 20' or larger for the shaping or filtering of sunlight. The lighting set-ups for these exterior shots can become quite extensive, and the use of boom lifts (called "condors") is common. Condors are especially useful at night when they are rigged to raise lights or diffusing material (up to 120 feet in the air) to create moon-effect lighting.

== Rigging ==
Grips also satisfy rigging needs on set. Examples of simple rigs include the menace arm, which allows a light to be boomed over set using one stand, or goalposts that span over top of set using two stands. More advanced rigs can include working with pulleys, steel cable or trusses. Grips also rig picture cars on process trailers, placing camera and lights around the vehicle for driving shots. This often includes the use of hood mounts, side mounts, suction cup mounts and proprietary clamps to attach film equipment to vehicles without causing damage.

Grips also do "blackouts" and "tenting-out" windows and doors. When shooting interiors day-for-night on location, grips need to eliminate all daylight entering the set. If windows or other openings are not visible in a shot, the light may be blacked out with a cloth known as duvetyne or rags, and in rare cases, plastic sheeting. When windows or doors are seen from camera, black out tents must be created outside of windows to allow lights to be placed outside, or green screens to be seen through the window, lit only by lights placed by electricians.

== Safety ==
Grips are also responsible for safety on the set as it relates to the force of gravity. Insofar as stands, ladders, scaffolds, and overhead rigs are properly installed, grips are charged with making them safe because the other crew members must climb on, walk around, or otherwise negotiate the different grip set-ups. The key grip may even be held responsible for injuries that happen on set, especially if the injury is caused by a falling lighting instrument.

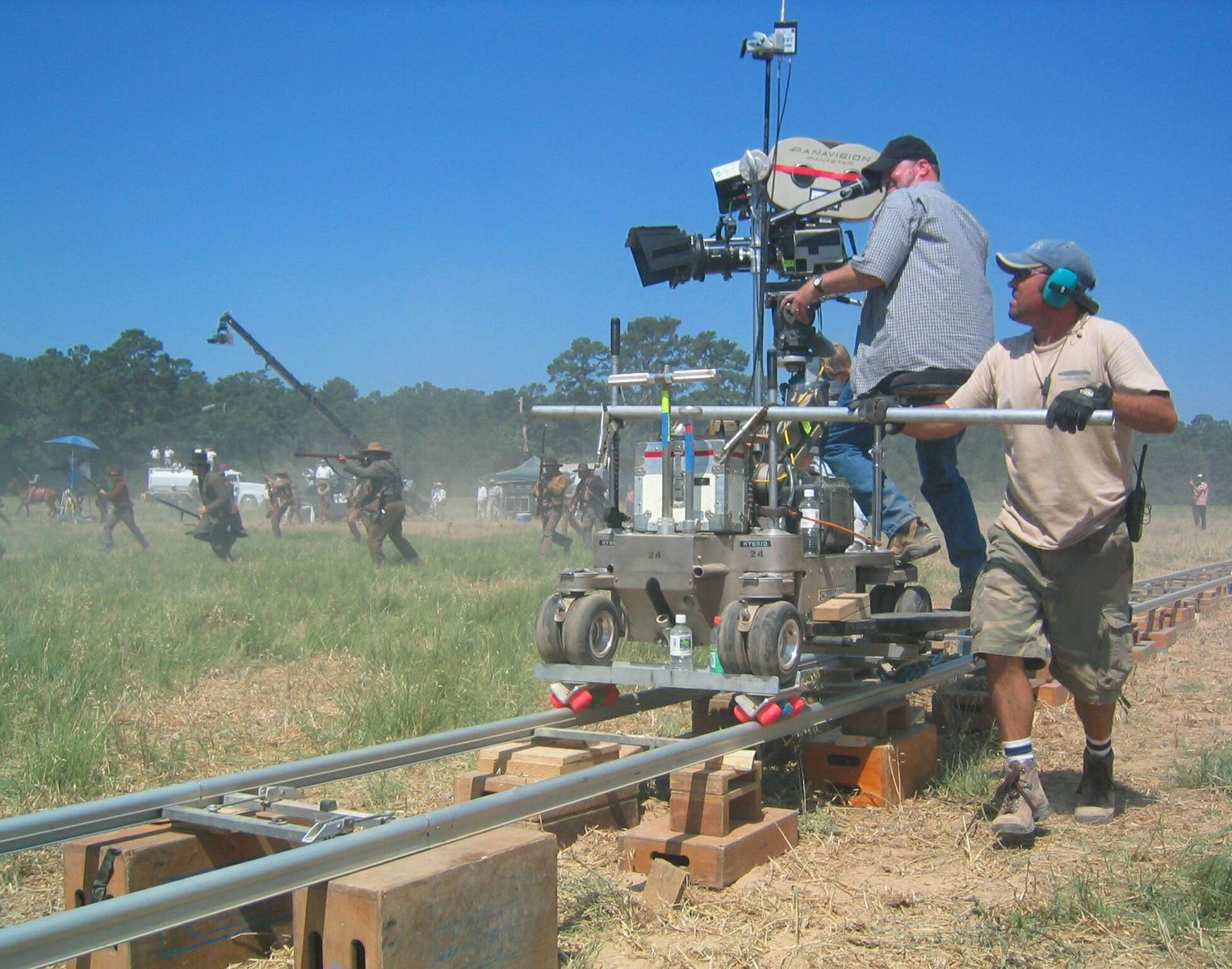
Cameraman and dolly grip filming The Alamo (2004)

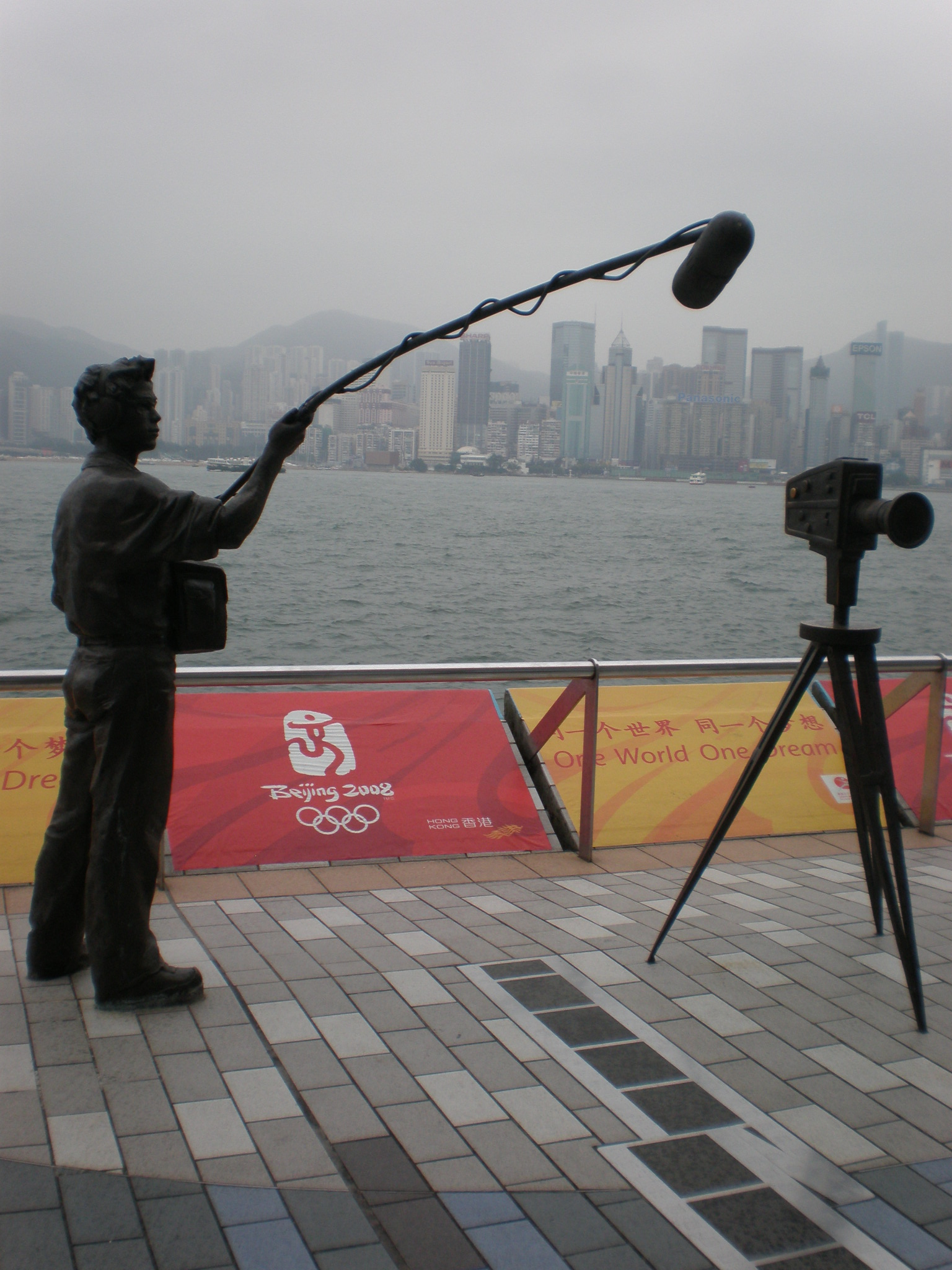
Statue of a boom operator on the Avenue of Stars in Hong Kong

== Tools ==
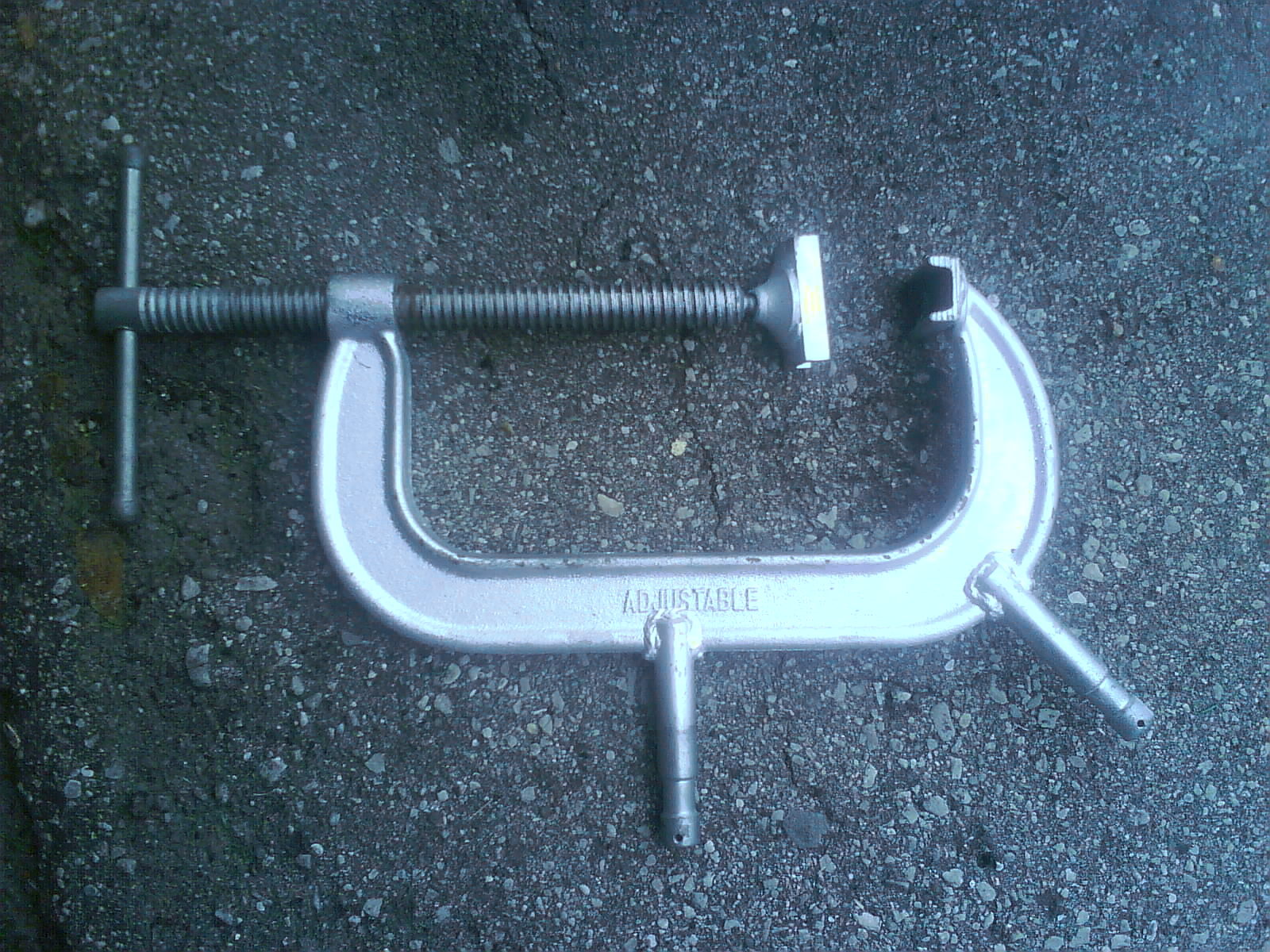
A C-clamp manufactured with studs for affixing lighting fixtures

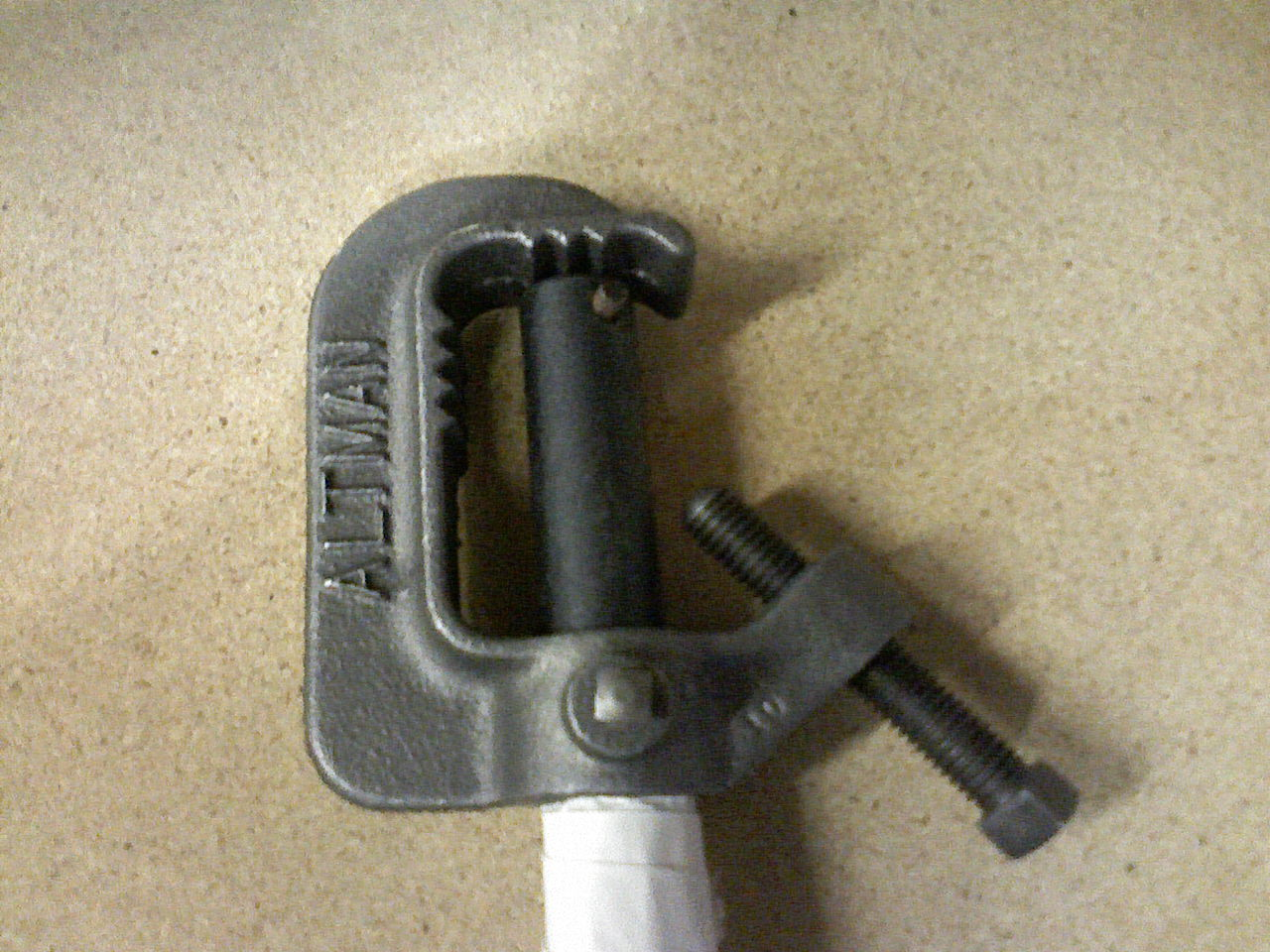
A C-clamp manufactured by Altman Stage Lighting for use on their lighting instruments. Note the square-headed pan screw on the shaft of the clamp.

A grip uses some tools typically used by mechanics and construction workers. As in those vocations, grips need hand tools at the ready (such as ratchet straps, wedges and a normal tool box).

== Common terms used by and for grips ==
- Arm up (Arm down) – To raise (or lower) the arm of a crane.
- Baby – Light fixtures between 750 and 1000 watts that are manufactured with a 5/8-inch female receiver for attaching to mounting hardware.
- Baby Plate – Used for mounting light fixtures that have a 5/8-inch receiver, also known as a "baby", to a flat surface, such as a wall or floor.
- Bar – A horizontal metal tube used to suspend lighting equipment.
- Batten – A narrow length of wood or metal used to fasten or secure equipment.
- Bar clamp (Furniture clamp) – A clamp with two jaws attached to a bar that can be used to mount a small light fixture. One jaw is fixed to the bar and the other can be adjusted with a screw mechanism. Often used on set along with a bar clamp adapter.
- Beef – Refers to the power of a light, such as "beef it up".
- BFL (Big F** Light or Big Fat Light) – Can refer to any of the large, heavy lights on a set.
- Big Ben – Refers to a cheeseborough clamp with a 1 1/8-inch pin attached and can be used for several options, including along with a pipe to create a temporary overhead grid.
- Black wrap – A black aluminum foil generally used as a heat insulation or to shape the direction of light.
- Blonde – 2,000 watt open-faced light fixtures usually made by an Italian manufacturer.
- Boom Operator – The person who holds the microphone boom.
- Boom up (Boom down) – To raise, or lower, a camera or microphone that is already mounted on a crane or dolly.
- Butterfly frame – A large aluminum frame that filters light through a fabric stretched from edge to edge, often used during outdoor shoots.
- C-47 - Clothespin used to hold gels on barndoors.
- C-stand – Originally known as a century-stand, it is designed to take up very little space and is generally made up of four parts, including the base, a vertical leg with multiple stands, a gobo head and a gobo arm. One of the most common pieces of equipment on a film set, it can hold a variety of reflectors, lights, show cards or boom microphones.
- Chain Vise Grip – A vise grip with a chain that is often used to hang a lighting fixtures or equipment.
- Condor – Named after the company that originally made extendable boom arms, it now refers to a variety of lift devices, including cherry-pickers. Generally used on set to position light between 30 and 120 feet in the air.
- Cookie (Cucoloris) – A perforated material used to break up light or project a shadow pattern. Random shapes cut out of plywood or poster board are known as hard cookies, while random shapes cut out of plastic impregnated screen, are known as soft cookies. Natural cookies are created by placing objects found in nature, such as tree limbs, between a light source and an actor or subject.
- Craft services – The catering service that provides buffet style snacks and drinks that are available to cast and crew throughout the shooting day. Should not to be confused with other catering companies that may be hired to serve full, hot sit-down meals, such as lunch or dinner.
- Cutters – Generally refers to flags larger than 30 inches by 36 inches as well as odd shaped ones such as 12 inches by 42 inches or 18 inches by 48 inches which are used to block light from specific areas of the set.
- Dailies (or Rushes) – The unedited footage of the day's filming, often viewed by the director, director of photography and key production staff after shooting has wrapped for the day.
- Dance floor – Not to be confused with a traditional dance floor used for weddings or special events. A production dance floor generally refers to putting down a double layer of 3/4 inch plywood with the seams offset, topped with Masonite, to allow a camera dolly to ride smoothly in any direction. This process usually occurs when a floor or surface area is not level.
- Dot – A small round scrim, mesh, net or solid material used to dim or control the brightness of a light, commonly used when a light cannot be dimmed electronically. May also be used when dimming a light would cause it to change color, such as fluorescent bulbs changing to an orange hue.
- Duvetyne – A black, cotton fabric used to make flags, cutters and butterflies. The opaque material can also be used to reduce reflected light.
- Feathering – A process of slowing down and speeding up a camera dolly extremely smoothly. For example, starting from a full stop, still position, the camera dolly must smoothly move up to the desired speed to capture the shot and then ease equally smoothly back to a complete stop.
- Flag – A Duvetyne-covered metal frame used to shield certain areas from unwanted light or to create shadow areas on the set. May also be known as a solid or a gobo.
- Gobo – A commonly used acronym for "Go Between", "Go BlackOut" or "Goes Before Optics", it is a dark plate, screen or partial screen placed in front of a lighting source to shield a lens and control the shape of emitted light. Sometimes also called a flag.
- Grip Head – A mount on the top of a stand used to attach flags or cutters.
- Hi Roller Stand – A wide based stand that may extend up to 20 feet, it provides stability when used as support for butterflies and overheads on locations or supports large backdrops in a studio setting.
- Junior – A 2,000 watt light fixture that usually includes a 1 1/8-inch pin and is mounted into a female receiver on a stand.
- Junior Plate – Used to mount light fixtures with a Junior pin to a flat surface, such as a wall.
- Kill it – A command to turn off a light or cancel a lighting request.
- Key light – The primary light source used during a scene.
- Manmaker (Apple Box, Pancake, Half Apple, Quarter Apple) – A sturdy wooden box placed under an actor, crew member or object to make it taller or raise it up. Depending upon the height required, boxes are available in several options, including one inch, two inches, four inches and eight inches high.
- Mafer Clamp – Featuring one flat and one v-notched jaw, both with padded grip surfaces, the clamp is used to attach equipment to an array of irregular surface, such as furniture.

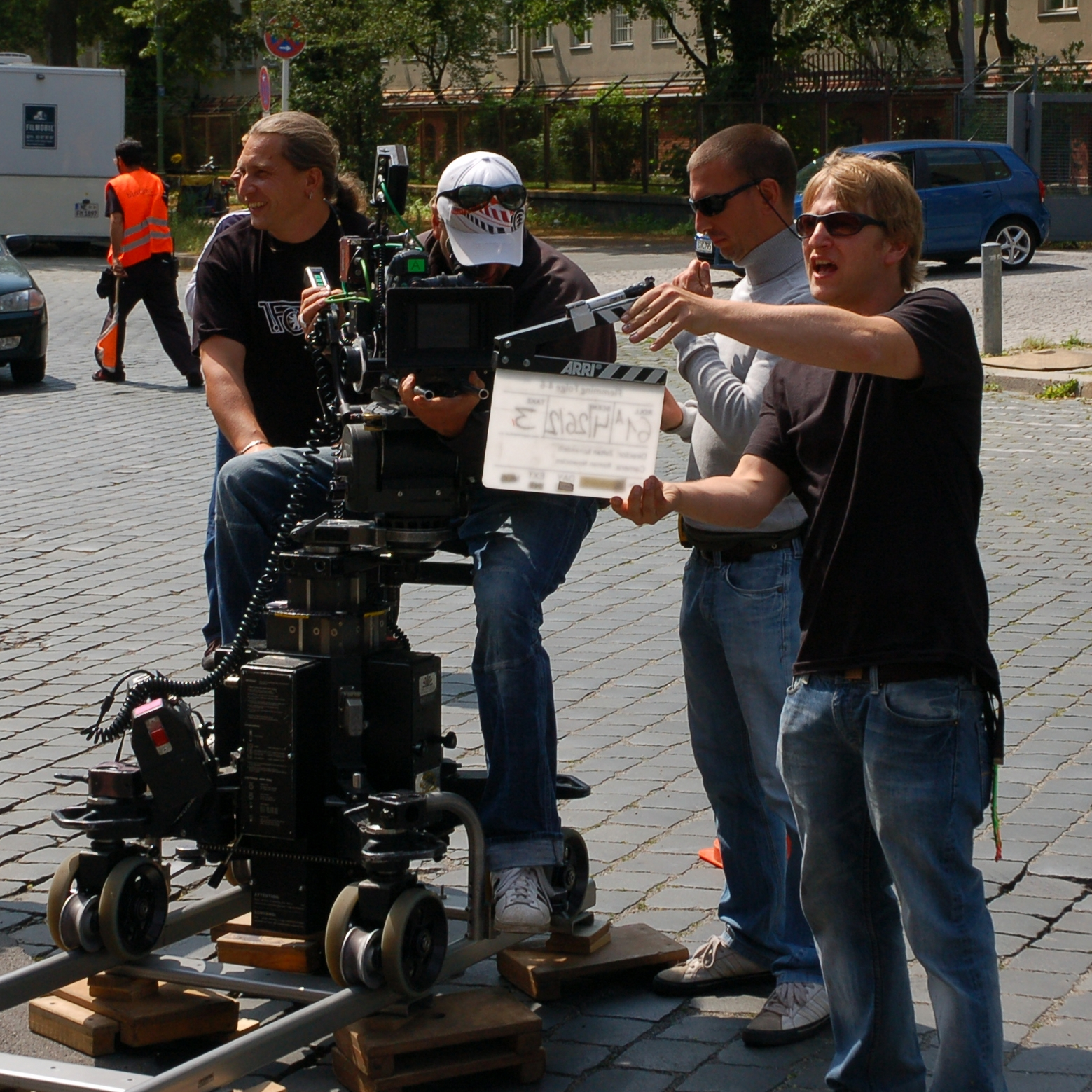
A clapperboard in use

- Movie Slate – Clapperboard: A board placed in front of a camera at the beginning, and sometimes at the end, of each take of each scene. The board is usually black and white and is used to identify the scene and take numbers.
- Offset Arm – A stand-mounted lighting fixture that can be extended off center over a wall or other object.
- Redhead – Refers to 1,000 watt open-faced light fixtures.
- Sandbag – Heavy cloth bags filled with sand that are used to secure equipment on set. Available in a variety of weights, sandbags commonly used by production companies are designed for ease of movement, such as draping over uneven objects like the legs of a lighting stand.
- Side Arm – An extension tool that can be clamped onto a stand to allow for slightly offset positioning of a light or light control device. Available with baby or junior fittings, it is important to sandbag the opposite leg of the stand from the sidearm to prevent the stand from tipping over.
- Snot Tape – A nickname for Adhesive Transfer Tape (ATG) 3M Scotch 1/2-inch tape, which is used to affix lighting gels to their frames, a pressure-sensitive tape.
- Storyboard – An illustrated outline of a scene or film plot sequence.
- Triple Header Baby – A piece of equipment mounted on a light stand which allows multiple light fixtures to be hung on a single stand with baby pins.
- Triple Header Junior – A piece of equipment mounted on a light stand which allows several light fixtures to be hung on a single stand with junior receivers.
- Wrap – The completion of a shot, a day's filming or the entire production.

== Types of grip ==
- Key grip or first company grip: the boss or head of the grip department.
- Best boy grip or second company grip: this is the key grip's right-hand person. He or she will act on behalf of the key grip in areas such as booking crew and equipment rental.
- 3rd grip, company grip, hammer, or gang grip: the majority of grips fit into this category. They work on set under the direction of the key.
- Construction grip: Constructs and dismantles the set. On the sound stage, construction grips are responsible for laying out, building, moving, and adjusting major set pieces (e.g. walls, ceiling flats) when something needs to be moved to get a camera or lights into position. Construction grips also build decks and platforms.
- Dolly grip: operates the dollies and sometimes camera cranes.

== See also ==
- Kuroko
