= C-stand =

Film set lighting technique

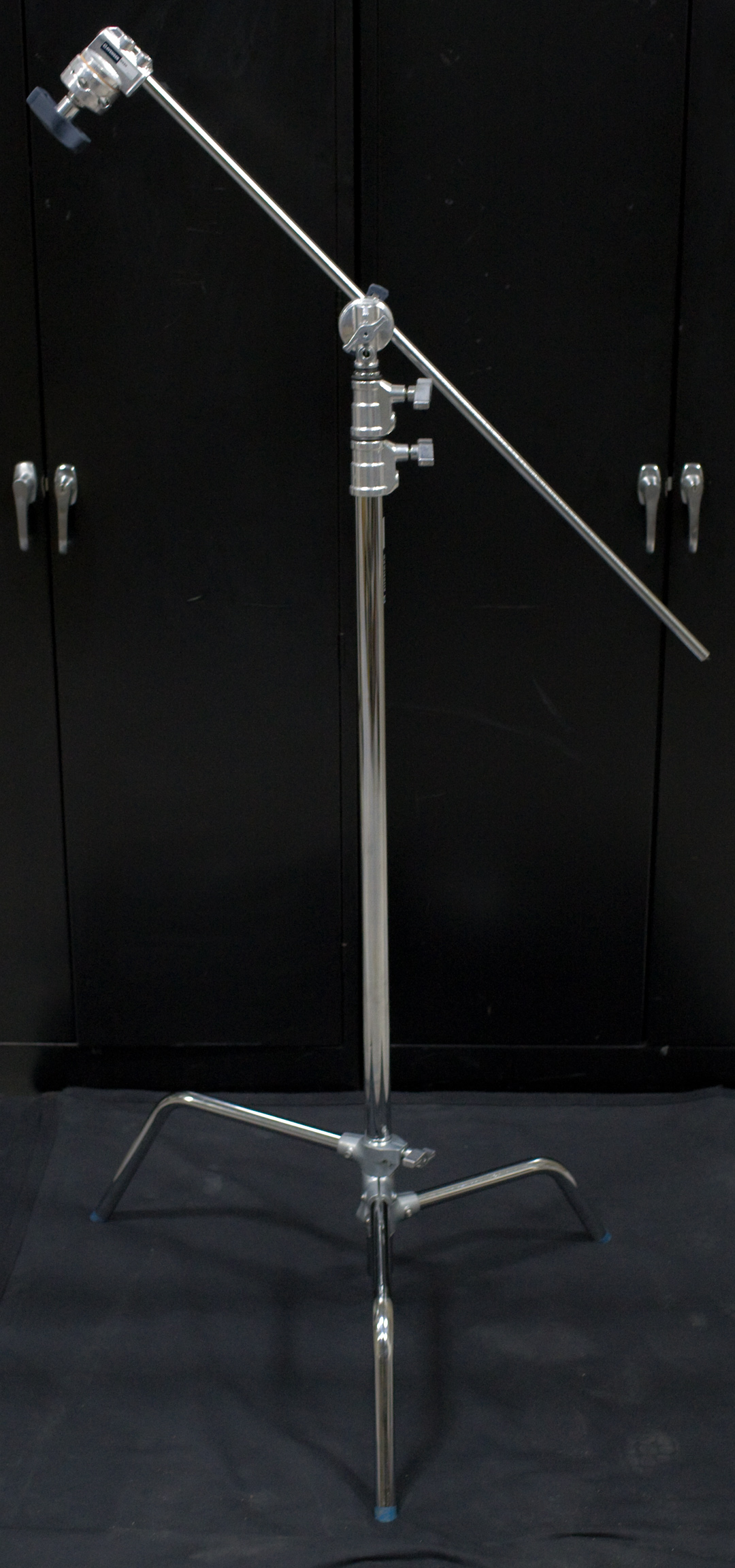
An Avenger brand 2-riser C-stand with a Rocky Mountain leg, 2.5" grip head and 40" grip arm. This stand extends to 10'.

In film production, a C-stand (or Century stand) is primarily used to position light modifiers, such as silks, nets, or flags, in front of light sources. The stand is constructed of metal and consists of a collapsible base, two riser columns, and a baby pin on top. In addition, a C-stand typically includes a gobo head and a gobo arm, also known as a grip head and grip arm, which provide the ability to articulate a light modifier without moving the stand itself. The legs of C stands are designed to be nested, so many stands can be placed around a light source.

A secondary use of C-stands is to position smaller light fixtures. A typical use would be to offset a backlight from the stand column, so that the stand itself can be placed out of shot, while the backlight hovers somewhere above the top edge of frame. In recent years, C-stands have found a new use, supporting the brackets used for balancing Steadicam (and similar) camera sleds.

These popular stands are available in many different configurations, lengths and finishes. The unique staggered leg design allows C-Stands to be nested and therefore be placed extremely close to one another on set. The lower leg can also be slid under many objects. The C+ offers a removable base for the risers known as a "turtle", providing an even lower base for positioning as well as making disassembly for travel simple and easy. The sliding leg allows for use on stairs, off curbs and even as high as a desk or countertop.

== History ==
The term C-stand comes from the early history of lighting equipment. The C-stand, or century stand, was named for the company that first produced bespoke lighting gear for live theater and filmmaking: Century Lighting based in New York City, which later became Century Strand and eventually Strand Lighting. In later years, studios, grips and gaffers began to manufacture the earliest versions of what we now call C-Stands. The original C-Stands had welded bases that did not fold up or adjust but the fact that they easily nested together made them invaluable on the stage. C-stands are an important component in the image maker's arsenal of tools.

In 1974, Matthews Studio Equipment introduced the industry's first folding base C-Stand.

== Use ==
Using a C-stand safely is a matter of proper technique, and on the job training. When setting and tightening a grip arm, flag or other equipment in the grip head, it is crucial that the gear be set to one side of the grip head such that the weight causes the locking knob to tighten clockwise, or "righty tighty". Failure to follow this rule will cause the weight to slowly loosen the head, eventually dropping the gear altogether.

Since a stand is used to hold a piece of gear high above or far off to the side, the base of the stand must be weighed down, commonly with shotbags, sometimes with sandbags. The bag is slung over the top of the tall stand leg so the weight is fully on the stand and not the ground.

== Types ==
A C-stand is sometimes referred to as a "grip stand". The Grip department always—and sometimes the electrical department—carries C stands for use with lights that don't mount onto baby or junior stands, such as kinos.

A "baby C-stand" is only 20 inches at its shortest height. It is nicknamed a "Gary Coleman" or a "Billy Barty" stand in the US. In the UK a short flag stand with stubby legs is called a "shotgun" flag stand (a reference to the stand having been "sawn off").

A C-stand with a removable base is called a C+ stand. The removable base is referred to as a turtle base. The opening at the top of the turtle base is a junior receiver. Turtle bases are great for setting up a light very low to the ground.

A C-stand with an upper most leg which is moveable on the vertical axis is called a Stair Leg C-stand or a Sliding Leg C-Stand, as the unit can be placed on a stairway. Also called a Rocky Mountain Leg.

A Punky C-Stand is a 20" C-Stand with a smaller base and footprint than the standard 20" size.

C-Stands come in multiple sizes: 20", 30", 40", and 60" - the most common sizes are 20" and 40". They may be chrome or black.
