= Construction grip =

Construction grips work on film and television sound stages and exterior sets both on and off film studio lots for various cinema projects in countries all over the world. Some studios are actually warehouses or buildings that have been converted into film and or television studios. An exterior set could just be one of the many facades built on or about a studio lot outside of the sound stages. However, it is quite common to see projects being filmed off lot, in and around the city.

The construction key grip and his crew work with the construction coordinator and his carpenters to execute any sets or set pieces that need to be erected or installed. The key is chosen and directed by the construction coordinator. The construction coordinator generally determines the order of work.

The division of labor is basic: The coordinator and his carpenters build the components of the set, the construction grips erect, level, and plumb the set. Then the carpenters trim the set in preparation for the scenic artists.

In addition, the construction grips accomplish any rigging that may need to be done. This could be flying set pieces or facades, mounting and securing them onto existing structures or hanging and building pipe grids over and above the sets to hang lighting and other equipment from. Construction grips also build stable catwalks around and above the sets for people to walk on and or hang and attach more items to. Operating heavy machinery is required in most cases; in some regions this is done by the Teamsters. They are also responsible for any backdrops that need to be hung.

Once complete, as per schedule, the shooting crew eventually comes in. The set is generally handed over to the regular shooting grips, unless there is a particularly large or complex piece that must be moved at a particular time.

The construction grip department, in general, is also traditionally charged with the safety of the construction crew, engendering other various labors for the construction grips: the shop and set, (until it is turned over to the set dressers), must be maintained free of debris, and lumber and building materials must be stowed or racked in a safe, neat, and accessible manner.

Construction grips are predominantly employed in the New York/New Jersey/Philadelphia regions of the US governed by IATSE local 52 specifically, where there is a different division of set construction labor compared to places such as Los Angeles, Atlanta and Vancouver.
