= Kino Flo =

Manufacturer of professional LED-based lighting equipment

- Type: Private
- Industry: LED light equipment
- Founded: 12 September 1987; 39 years ago
- Headquarters: Burbank, California

Kino Flo is a manufacturer of professional LED-based lighting equipment for cinema and television and production. Located in Burbank, California, Kino Flo is best known for developing proprietary LEDs based on a color science technology that ensures color quality for lighting both close-ups and on large studio spaces.

== History ==
According to director Wim Wenders, as discussed on the Criterion Collection edition of his 1977 gangster film, The American Friend, Robby Müller first assembled and used a primitive Kino Flo unit in 1976, during the shooting of the film. The Kino Flo unit was legitimized in 1987, during the filming of the movie Barfly. Director of photography Robby Müller was filming in a cramped interior was unable to fit traditional lights into the location. In order to work around the problem, the film's gaffer Frieder Hochheim and best boy Gary Swink designed a high-output fluorescent light that had a remote ballast, allowing the lamp unit to become small and lightweight enough to be taped to the wall. Hochheim and Swink subsequently created a company, Kino Flo Incorporated, to manufacture and market their innovation to the film industry. The new lights were quickly embraced by cinematographers, and now are considered a staple of a standard motion picture lighting package.

== Technology ==
The two major innovations of the unit were the high-frequency ballast, which gave the lights greater intensity and eliminated flicker commonly found in off-the-shelf fluorescent tubes, and the Kino Flo tubes, which contained a number of special phosphors designed to eliminate the characteristic tints in the magenta-green spectrum which are present in most domestic fluorescent lights. Since the type of tube determines the color temperature, any Kino Flo lamphead can be quickly converted between daylight and tungsten balances by simply changing out the tubes. Mid-range color temperature can also be created by mixing tubes of both color temperatures. Kino Flo have also expanded their tube line, creating visual effects tubes optimized for bluescreen and greenscreen spectra, as well as a variety of other shades for general color effects.
