= Wig-wag (sound stage) =

A wig-wag (also wigwag, wig wag) is the red light (also known as a "red-eye") near each door of a motion picture sound stage. It flashes to indicate that cameras are rolling inside the stage and no one should enter or exit the stage for any reason, and all people and vehicles outside should remain quiet. A flashing wig-wag is accompanied by one long buzzer when the cameras start rolling, and two shorter buzzers when cameras stop rolling.

== See also ==
- Sound stage
