= Key grip =

Person in charge of grip crews and equipment management

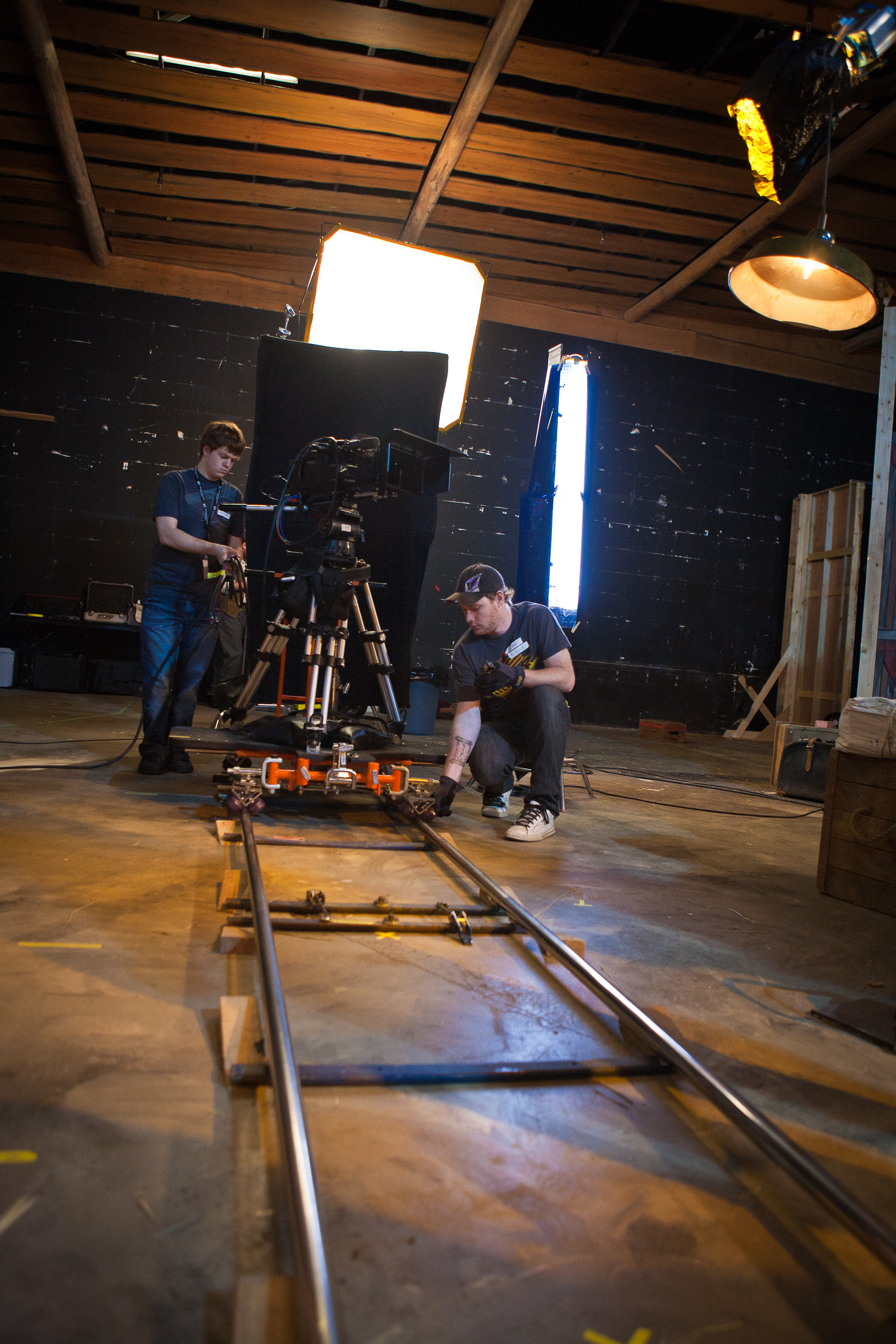
Key grip working on set

A key grip is a senior role on movie sets, involved with a wide variety of behind-the-scenes tasks. The key grip supervises grip crews who support camera and lighting technicians; assesses what equipment is necessary for each shooting location; coordinates the transportation of this equipment and its setup; and arranges the general movement and positioning of the camera and collaborating with the director of photography. The key grip relies on the best boy as their foreperson to supervise the grip crew.

Industry myths vary as to the origins of the name "grip". Some say it originated from the early days of the film industry when a production crew consisted of a director, camera person, assistants and workers. Workers acted as handymen, setting up all equipment needed, working from a kit, container or bag containing their tools. This bag was known as a "grip" and, as the industry evolved and workers began to separate into specialized groups, the name grip stuck with those that worked on rigging. It is most likely, however, that the term has origins in railway work, where "gaffers" and "grips" formed an integral part of the US rail transport system in the 19th century. The term "gaffer" is a contraction of "grandfather" or "godfather", used by immigrant Irish-Americans as a term of respect for the supervisor of a gang of working men. A "grip" was a worker whose job it was to grip the electric cable above the tram and transfer it to the new line when the tram reached a junction. As the film industry took off, these titles became part of the vernacular. The word "key" when applied to "grip" simply means "principal".

The role and responsibilities of a key grip can differ by region. In the United States, key grips supervise the set-up of both cameras and lights, despite unions preventing key grips from touching lights, while in places such as Hungary, key grips are able to move lights around to their suiting and electricians simply deal with "everything that's connected to a lamp".

== Responsibilities ==
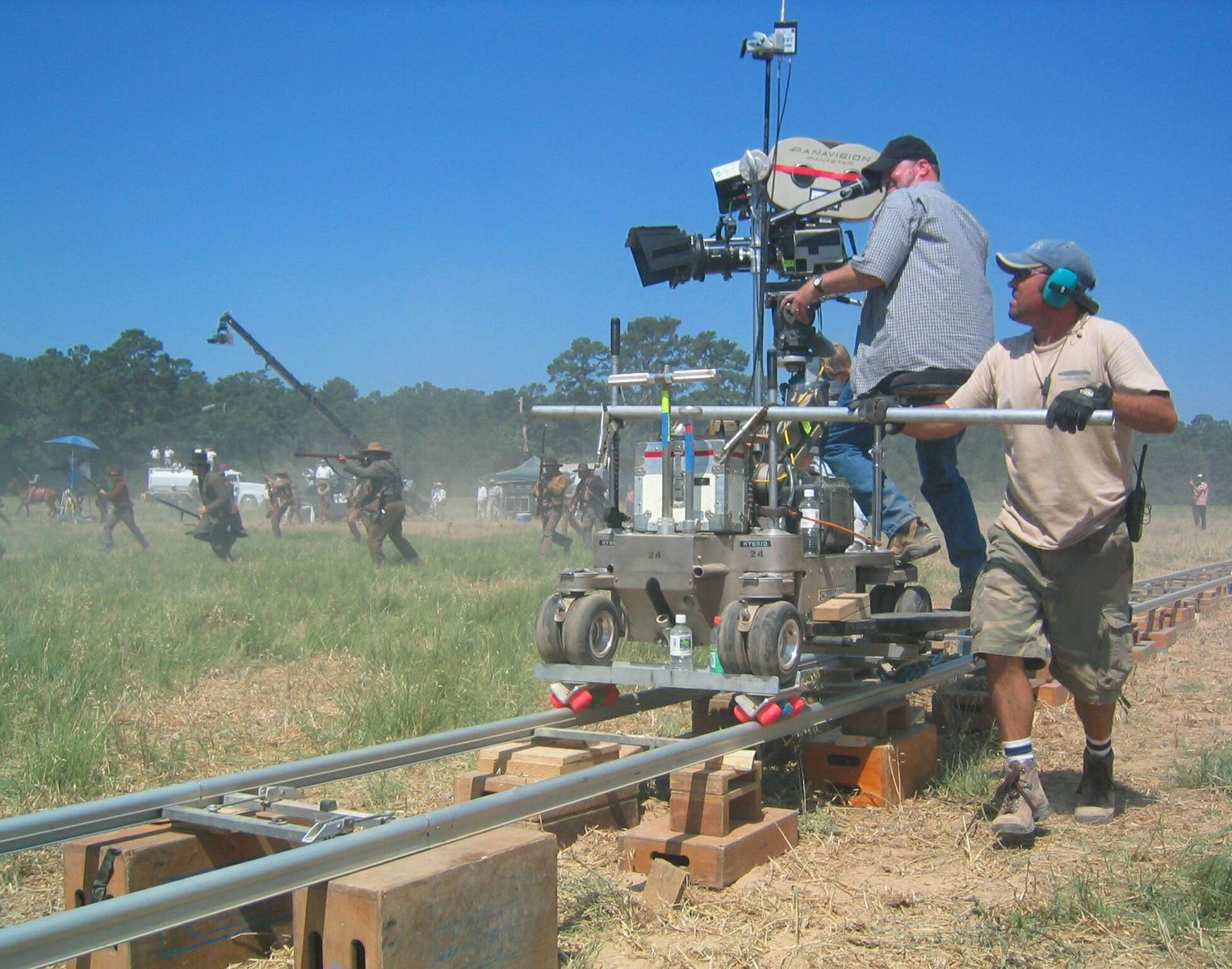
Key grip working on location

The job of key grip is a challenging one, demanding long hours, manual labour and travel. The roles and responsibilities that come with this are extensive and, as a result, key grips are expected to possess a wide variety of skills. These include creativity, adaptability, good communication, patience, agility, comfort with heights and leadership qualities.

Communication is particularly essential as much of a key grip's work comes from their collaboration with directors, gaffers and electricians as well as the management of the grip crew. Some of the most important work between the director and key grip happens in pre-production, where meetings are held to discuss the vision for the project and how, through lighting and rigging, the key grip can bring this to life. To ensure that each series of shots can be created as envisioned, key grips direct where equipment is placed, coordinate the rigging and work with the gaffer on lighting positions. These meetings are typically followed by a location scout where the key grip will assess shooting locations and construct a general plan for the setup of lighting and rigging.

Key grips are depended upon to source the equipment themselves. As equipment is expensive and the amount required is extensive, it is typically rented from production companies and the key grip uses discretion and experience to determine from which companies to source the equipment. Often more than one company is relied on to fully satisfy the sizeable list of required equipment, all of which is organised in pre-production. The truck loaded with all the rented equipment is referred to as a grip package and the responsibility of its arrival at set also falls on the key grip.

Pre-production is also a chance for the key grip to assess how much work the project is going to take and hire grips accordingly to form the grip crew. The key grip is assisted primarily by the best boy, who acts as a second in charge, taking care of equipment, ordering supplies and supervising pre-rigging.

To enact the directors vision, the key grip is expected to keep up with a wide array of tasks to achieve specific shots. These can include rigging lights to vehicles for running shots, rigging silks and overheads, the placement of sand bags, transporting and adjusting heavy equipment, weatherproofing lights and cutting and shaping lights. A key grip is expected to quickly address, and ideally anticipate, any problems that arise when completing these tasks.

== Tools ==
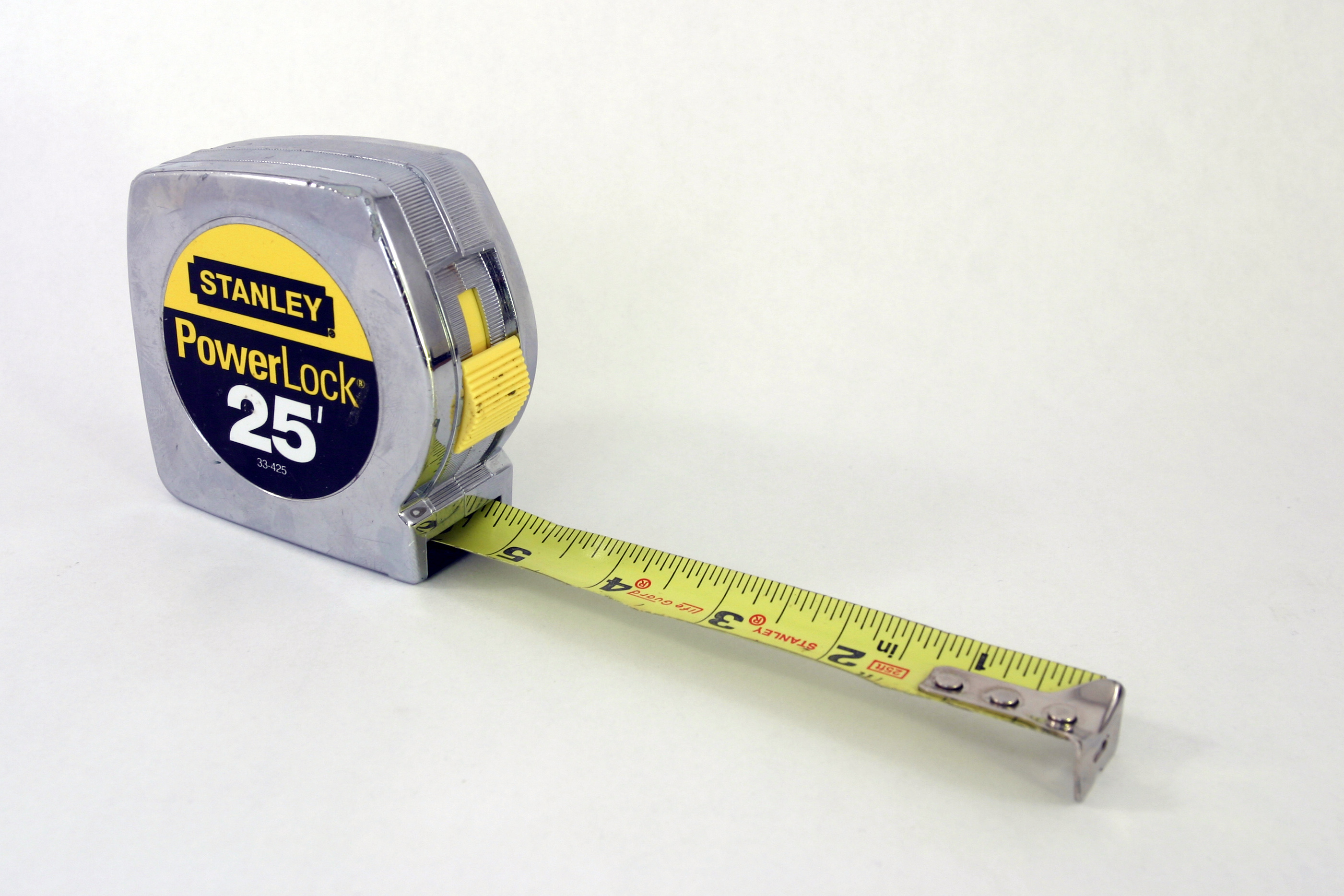
Tape Measure

To ensure that production runs smoothly key grips are required to have a personal tool kit with, at minimum, a 'claw hammer, screwdriver, wire cutters, pliers, crescent wrench, and a tape measure'. These basics are required by union contracts, as much of a film crew's safety and production depend on the ability of a key grip to efficiently and effectively complete their job. Alongside these basics, key grips are expected to be comfortable operating dangerous power tools and should add extra tools as they see fit.

=== Commonly used tools ===
- Claw hammer: For removing nails, providing better leverage than a typical hammer
- Tape measure: Ideally between 25 and 30 ft tape measure, necessary to correctly adjust lights and to measure distances
- Lineman's pliers: Appropriate for heavy-duty cutting, bending or gripping of an object.
- C-wrenches: Aid in everyday rigging duties, 8–10" varieties typically preferred
- Chalk: Makes for easy marking of equipment when measuring, adjusting or setting up
- Gloves: For safety purposes durable work gloves are required
- Gaffer tape: Easily tearable multipurpose cloth tape, useful when adjusting cables and cords, fixing equipment, etc.
- Torpedo level: Small, portable levels, approximately 9 inches long, useful for rigging, lighting, etc.

== Career path ==
Typically, no degree is required of a key grip; however, those that have attended film school generally have some advantage as they are familiar with the processes of production. The International Alliance of Theatrical Stage Employees also offers training and advancement courses that are beneficial to those looking to make it in the industry. However, in places such as Chicago, key grips are expected to train in lighting, makeup, props and craft services as part of a three-year apprenticeship.

Despite the benefit a formal education can provide, the most significant qualification of a potential key grip is extensive experience on set. This can be gained by interning for key grips or at equipment rental companies to gain connections and experience. Typically, key grips will have worked within the grip crew for many years and, as a result, have established strong relationships with the rest of their crew. Starting out in the grip crew, it is expected that, with more experience, potential key grips will follow the path of grip, dolly grip, best boy and then key grip

Typically, those looking to be key grips can expect a minimum of $36.35 an hour based on IATSE agreements, with starting yearly income of $60,000/year, increasing based on seniority and experience. The occupation is overwhelmingly male; from 2016 to 2018, only 1.4% of key grips working on major films were women.

== In other countries ==
In the US, key grips are responsible for much of the rigging and positioning of the camera and, despite being in charge of the set up and arrangement of lights, are prevented from moving lights due to standards set by unions; similarly, in the UK, key grips work solely with cameras. Many find this division of labour unnecessary and time-consuming as riggers must be hired to move cameras for the key grip and electricians are expected to rely on grips for any help with flagging.

European key grips are expected to oversee the camera and all that comes with it such as dollies, cranes, etc., essentially taking on the US equivalent of a dolly grip. For example, on larger sets, key grips will typically service camera A while a second grip will service camera B. The full responsibility of lighting is left to electricians while tasks requiring heavy rigging are left to grips. This typically means that European crews are made up of more electricians and fewer grips.
