= Dolly grip =

Cinematography technician who operates the camera dolly

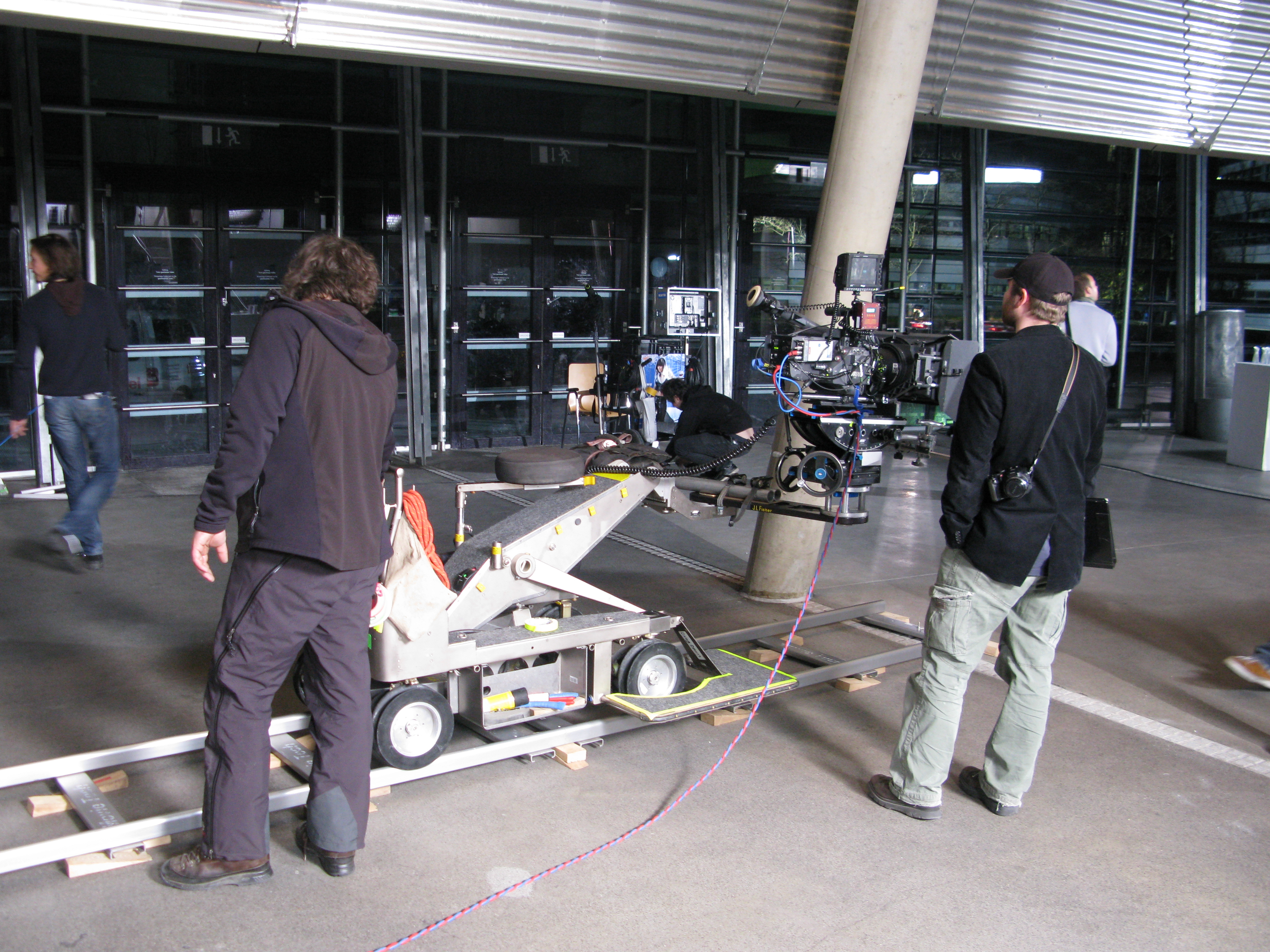
Camera dolly mounted on track with an Arriflex D-21 camera

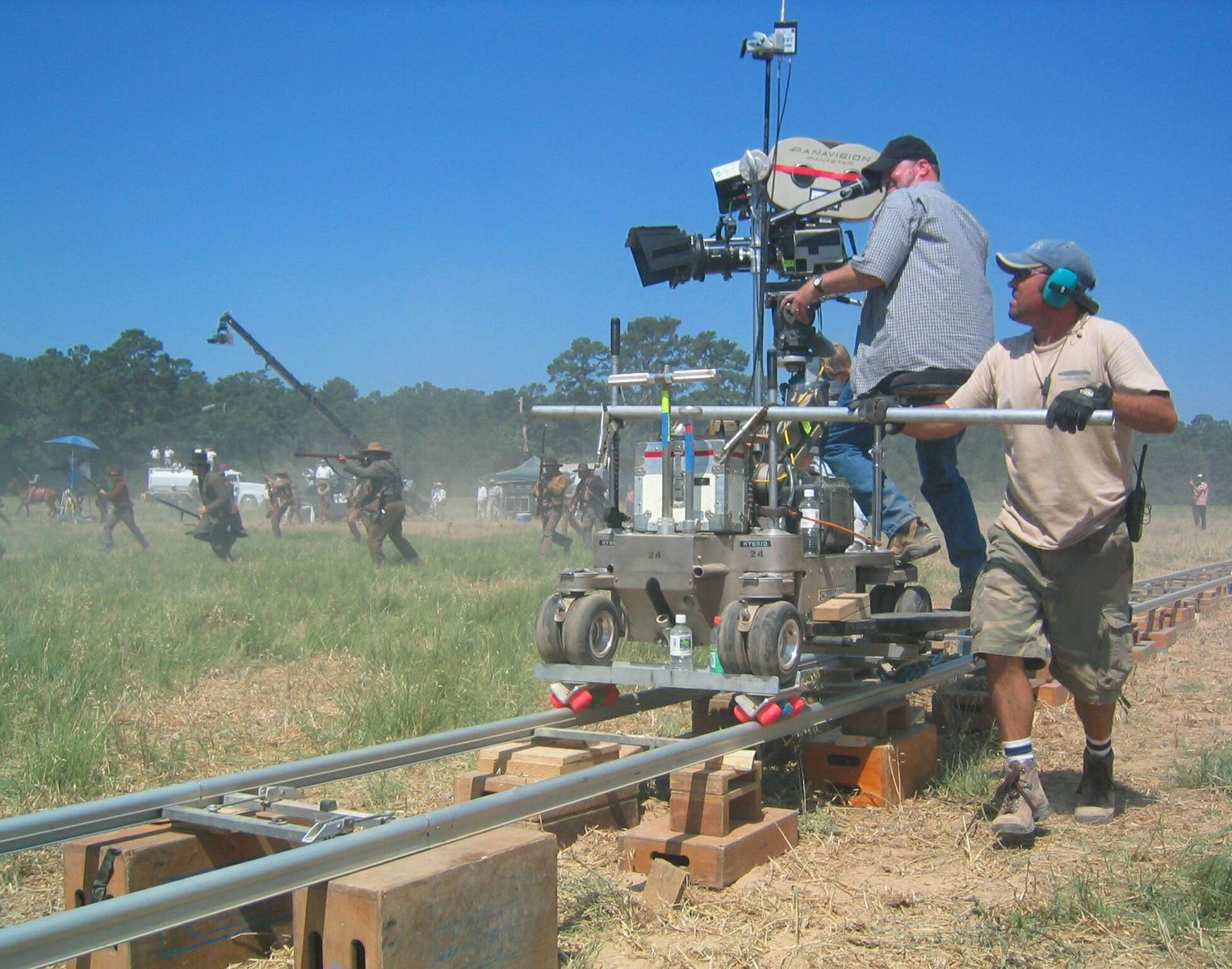
During filming of The Alamo, a tracking shot was used during a battle scene.

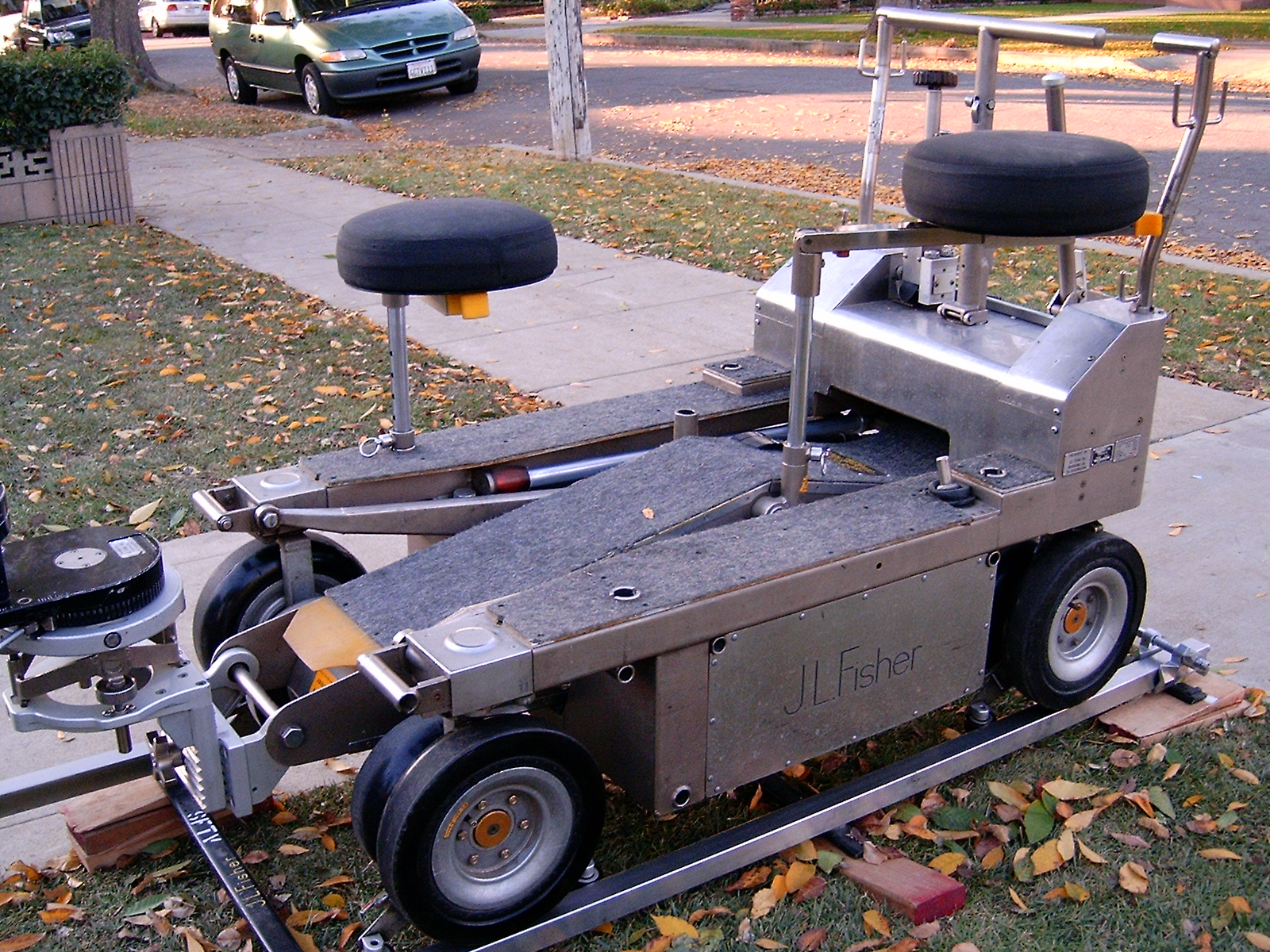
Fisher dolly on track

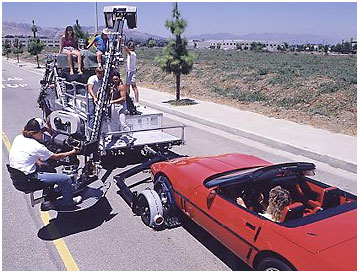
Tow dolly

In cinematography, the dolly grip is a dedicated technician trained to operate the camera dolly. This technician places, levels, and moves the dolly track, then pushes and pulls the dolly and usually a camera operator and camera assistant as riders. If the dolly has a movable vertical axis, such as a hydraulic arm, then the dolly grip also operates the "boom". If both axes are used simultaneously, this type of dolly shot is known as a compound move.

A dolly grip must work closely with the camera crew during rehearsals. Focusing the lens is necessary to capture a sharp image, so a dolly grip must hit their marks in concert with a camera assistant who pulls focus.

A dolly grip is also employed when the camera is operated in handheld mode (on the operator's shoulders or literally in their hands). While the camera operator is moving with the camera, the dolly grip is responsible for the operator's safety, helping the operator to "blindly" negotiate sometimes complicated environments. The dolly grip silently directs the operator (through gentle touches, nudges, pulls and pushes) away from walls and other obstacles that the operator cannot see while concentrating on the image in the camera viewfinder. The same is true when the camera is operated with a Steadicam or similar body-mounted stabilization tool.

Dolly grips may also push a wheeled platform holding the microphone and boom operator.

Crane operators in the film industry are specially trained film crew. They are normally grips.

Some shots require the camera to move. This can be done several ways, one of which is to use a camera crane. There are many types of camera cranes, most being a counterbalanced arm on a pivot, whilst others are hydraulic. Cranes can be used to lift the camera, and often the camera operator and assistant also, quickly into the air. The crane operator sets up and operates the camera crane so that the camera arrives at the right spot. This can be difficult since the camera may be a long distance from the operator.
