= Process trailer =

Trailing vehicle used as a moving camera platform

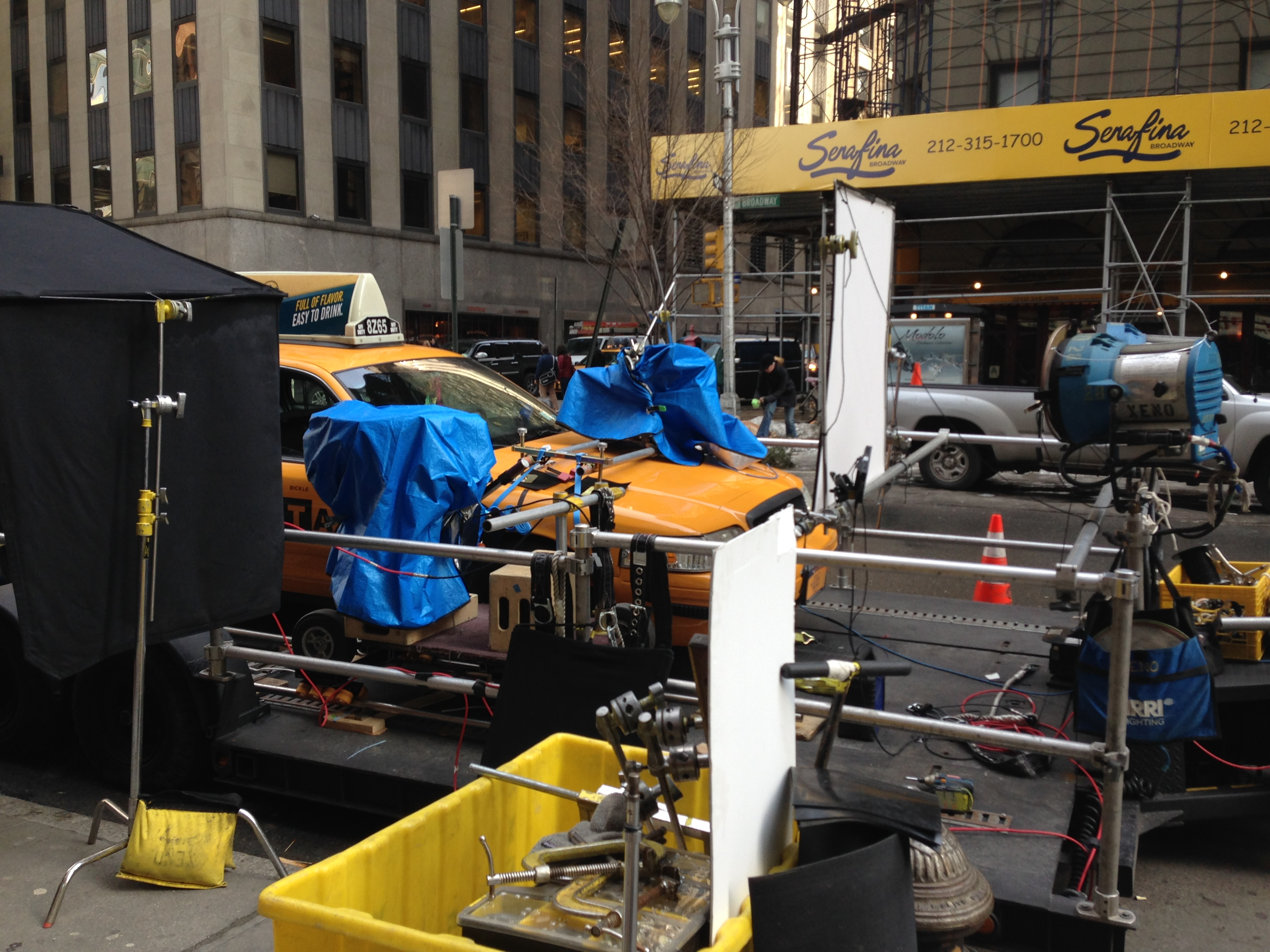
A New York City taxicab loaded onto a process trailer with lights and cameras in preparation for a filming

A process trailer, also known as insert trailer and low loader, is a trailer towed by a tracking vehicle for the purpose of being used as a moving camera platform. They are generally very low to the ground to give a realistic perspective of height and can be expanded in width to allow the camera to achieve a wider shot. Process trailers are most often used to shoot dialogue scenes inside cars or other vehicles while reducing risk for actors who would otherwise drive while delivering lines.

The trailer is composed of a wheeled platform, low to the ground, with the vehicle secured on top. The vehicle on the platform is known as a "picture car". The platform itself is then towed by another vehicle with crew members and camera equipment to film the actors in the vehicle. Although process trailers are safer for actors, there is still a significant risk to the driver and passengers of the towing vehicle - for this reason, process trailers are often led by a police vehicles to prevent traffic accidents. In Australia, process trailers must be accompanied by police and may only be used with a permit.
