= Camera dolly =

Wheeled cart or similar device used in filmmaking and television production

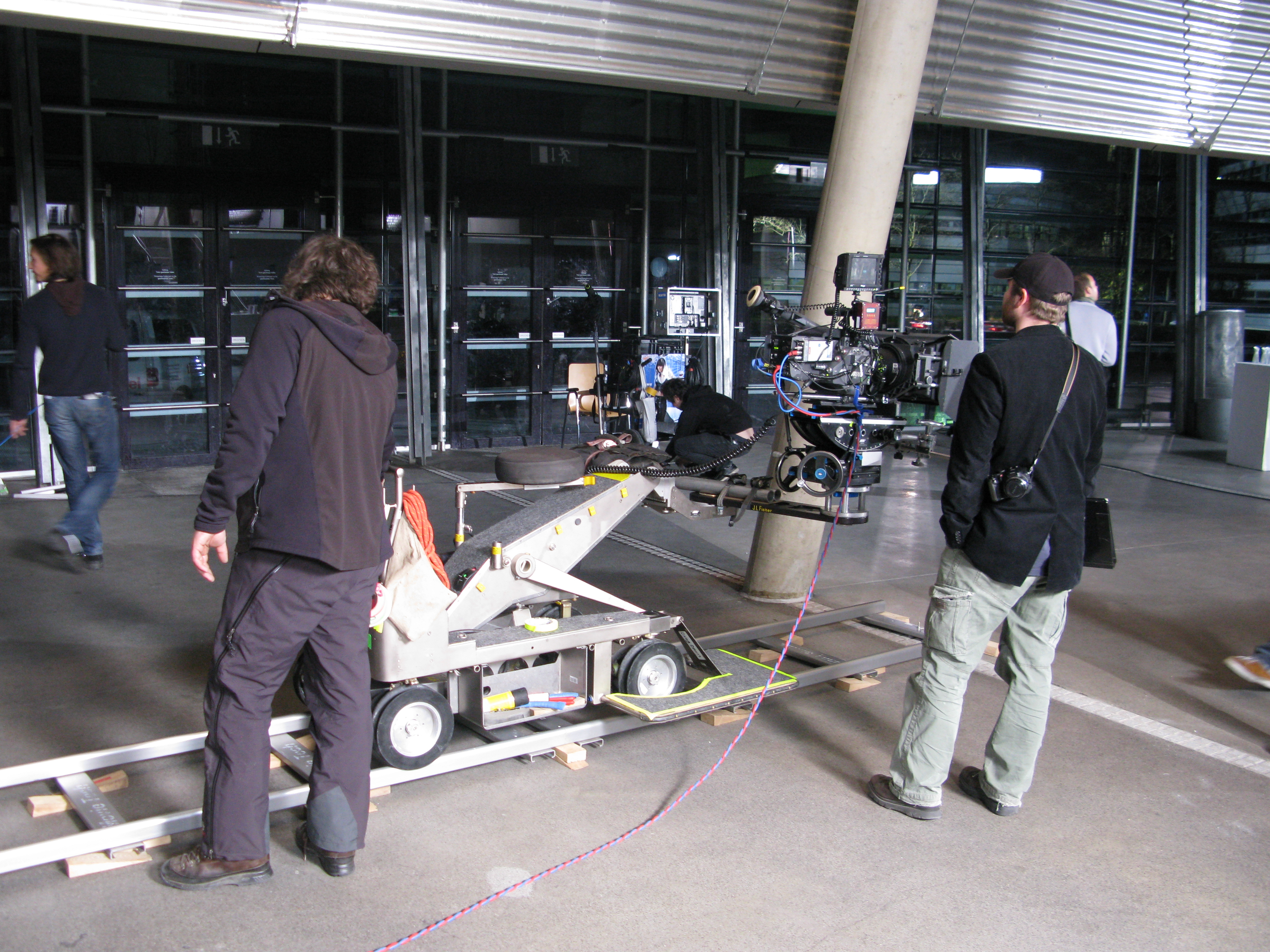
Camera dolly mounted on track with an Arriflex D-21 camera

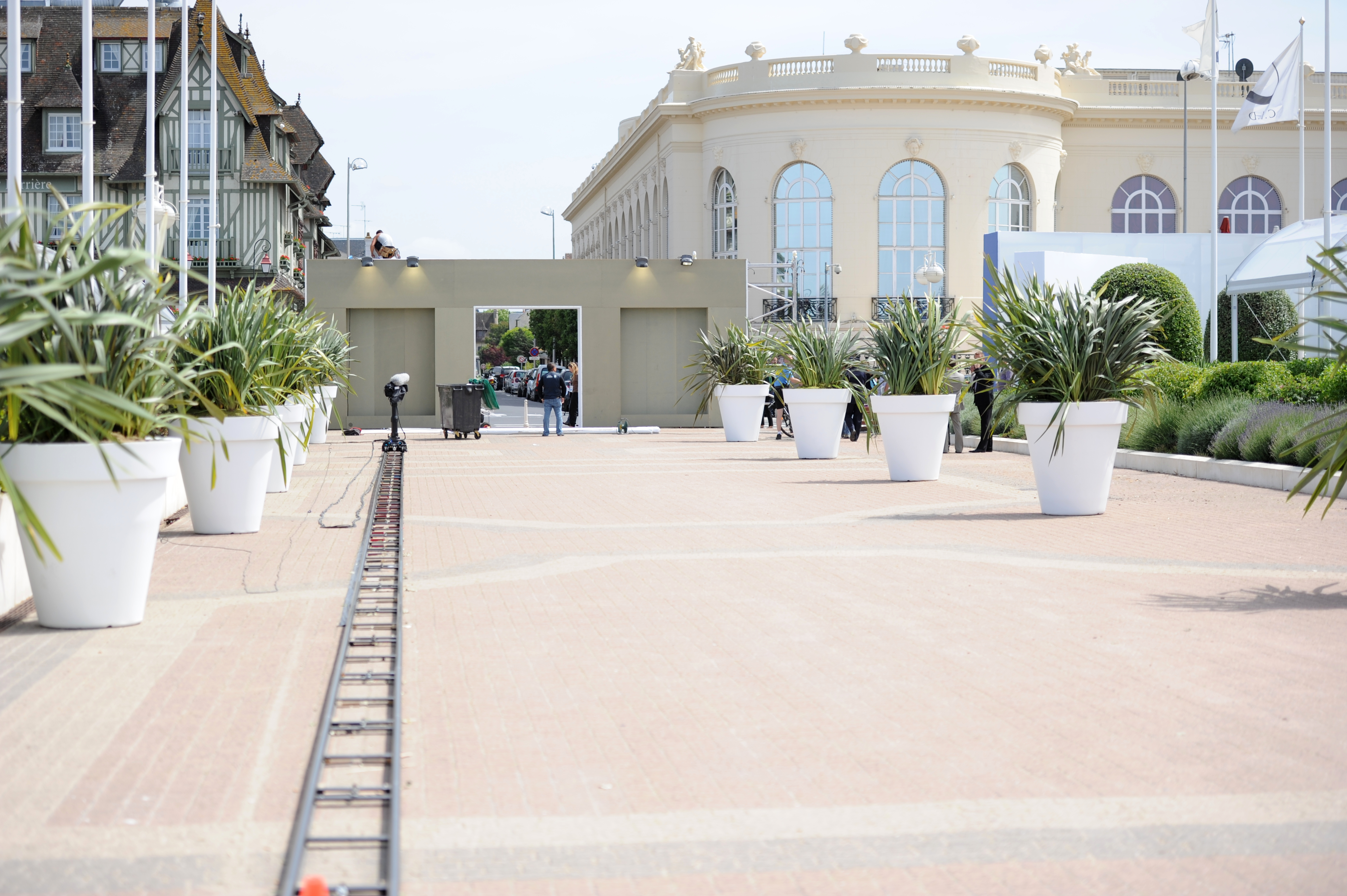

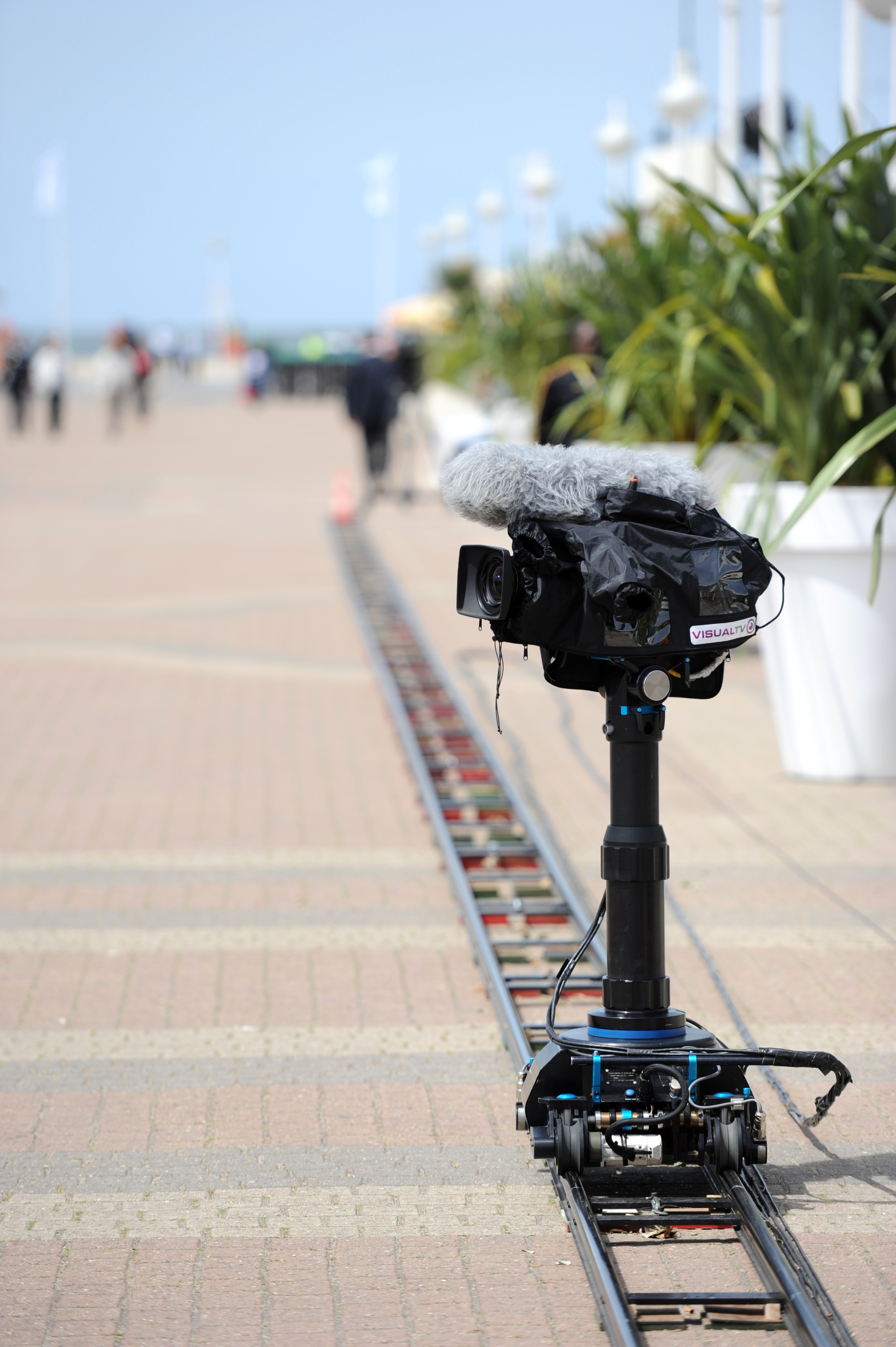
Camera dolly on a long track at the G8 summit in 2011

A camera dolly is a wheeled cart or similar device used in filmmaking and television production to create smooth horizontal camera movements. The camera is mounted to the dolly and the camera operator and focus puller or camera assistant usually ride on the dolly to push the dolly back and forth. The camera dolly is generally used to produce images which involve moving the camera toward or away from a subject while a take is being recorded, a technique known as a "dolly shot". The dolly grip is the dedicated technician trained to operate the dolly by manually pushing it back and forth.

== Movement ==
The camera dolly may be used as a shooting platform on any surface but is often raised onto a track, to create smooth movement on a horizontal axis known as a tracking shot. Additionally, most professional film studio dollies have a hydraulic jib arm that raises or lowers the camera on the vertical axis. When a dolly grip operates a dolly on perpendicular axes simultaneously, it's known as a compound move.

Dolly moves may also be executed without track, giving more freedom on the horizontal plane and with it, a higher degree of difficulty. These are called dancefloor moves and may either be done on the existing surface (if smooth enough) or on an overlay designed for dolly movement. The ground overlay usually consists of thick plywood as a bottom layer and masonite on top.

Camera dollies have several steering mechanisms available to the dolly grip. The typical mode is rear-wheel steering, where the front wheels remain fixed, while the wheels closest to the operating handle are used to turn. A second mode, round steering, causes the front wheels to turn in the opposite direction from the rear wheels. This mode allows the dolly to move in smooth circles and is frequently used when the dolly is on curved track. A third mode, called crab steering, is when the front wheels steer in the same direction as the rear wheels. This allows the dolly to move in a direction diagonal to the front end of the dolly.

== Types ==
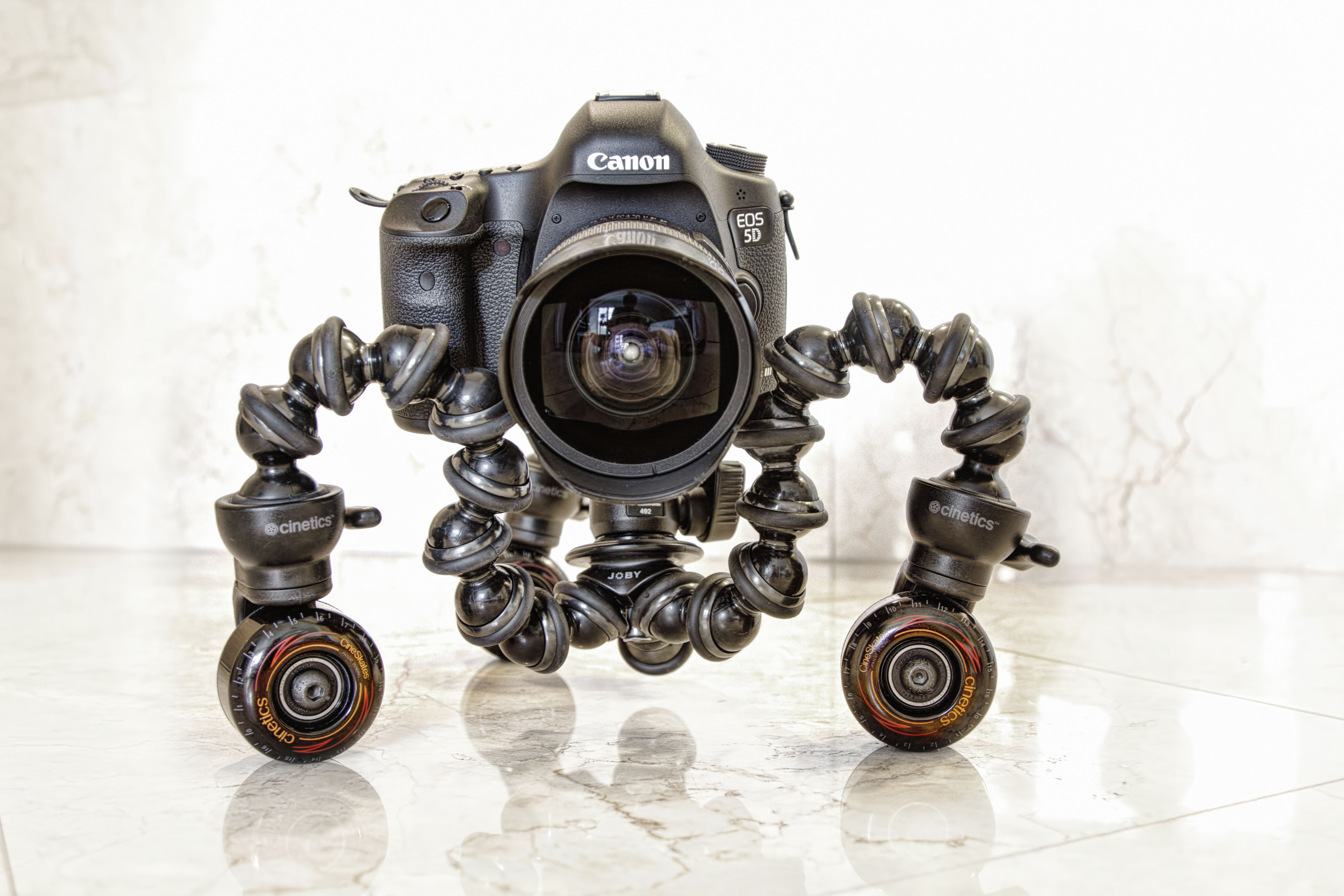
Flexible tripod based camera dolly

Studio dollies are large and stable and can feature hydraulics. These are the first choice for studio, backlot and location shoots when using professional cameras. A studio dolly usually needs a specialized operator called a "dolly grip", and many are built for the camera operator to ride on the dolly with the camera.

Lightweight dolly systems are more simple and affordable, and are best used with lighter-weight cameras. Lightweight systems are usually favored by independent filmmakers and students because they are easier to carry and operate. These dollies support only the camera, and the operator needs to move alongside. Some lightweight dollies are small enough to be carried in a backpack.

The best way to be able to replicate the same camera movement for multiple takes (which is important for editing) is to use a dolly on track.

== Remote dolly systems ==
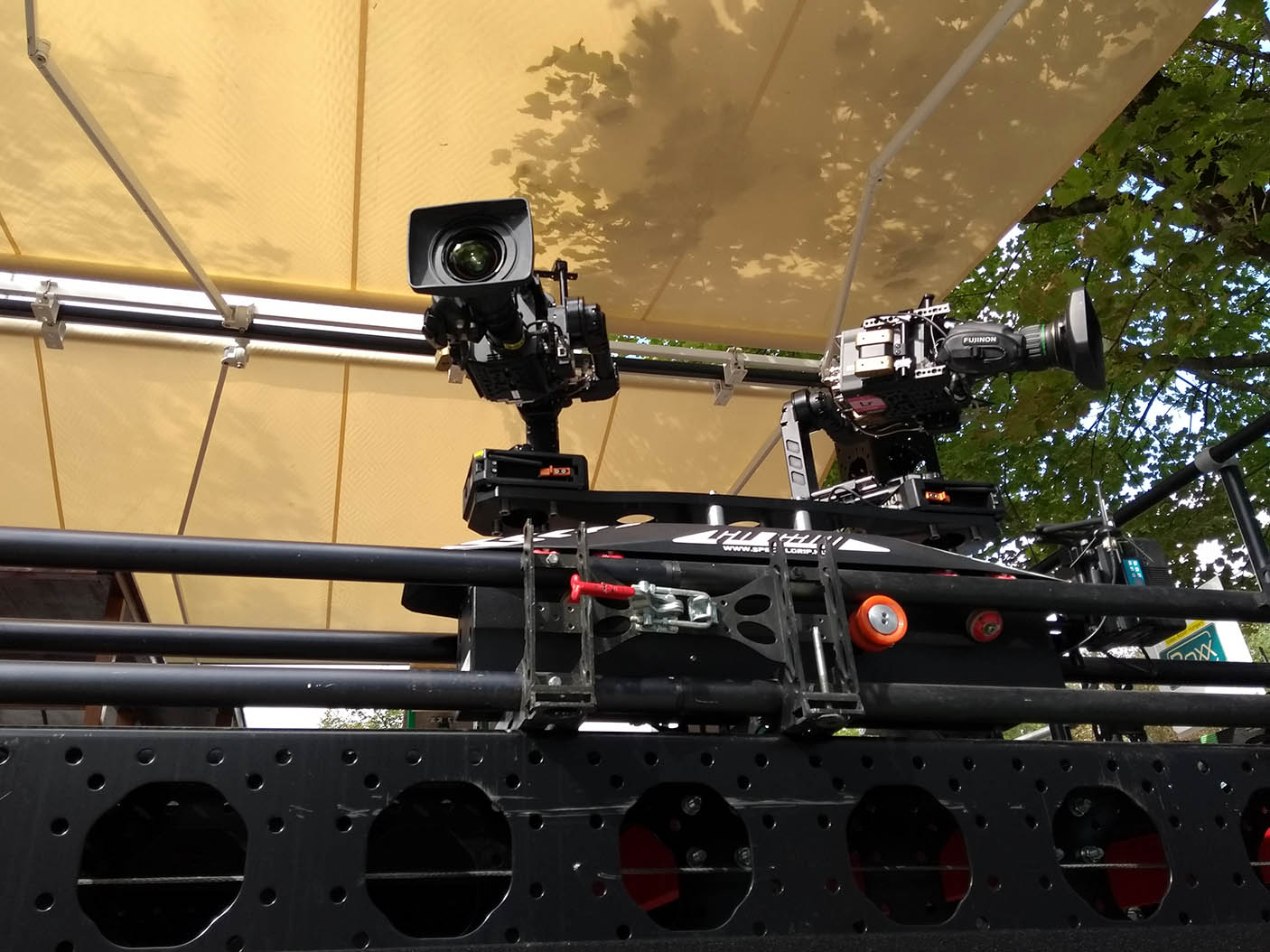
2 Newton stabilized heads on a remote controlled moving camera dolly for live TV broadcast

In TV production, remote controlled camera dollies are often used for fast but discreet camera movement. A metal rail is laid out for example in front of a stage and a remote controlled dolly is moving the broadcast camera horizontally, where a cameraman would obstruct the view for the audience behind the camera. A common remote dolly system with camera stabilization is a Blackcam dolly with a Newton stabilized camera head.

== Track ==
Dolly tracks used for heavy cameras have traditionally been constructed of steel or aluminium. Steel, although heavier than aluminum, is less expensive and withstands heavier use. Longer track segments, while heavier to transport, allow track to be laid straighter with less effort. Curved track is also available. Plastic versions of track have been used with lightweight dolly systems. In the 2000s, flexible rubber track allowed quicker set up and easier transportation for use with light cameras.

== Gallery ==
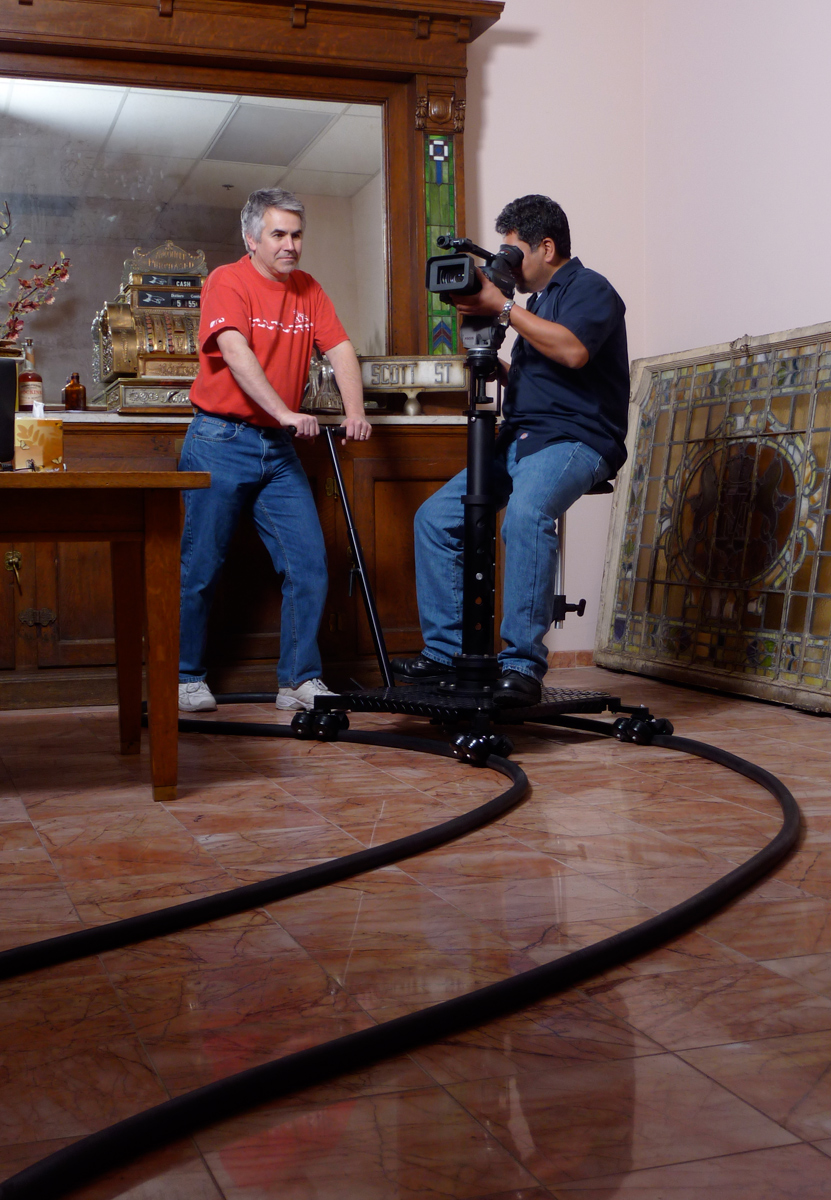
A lightweight riding dolly on flexible track with a seat

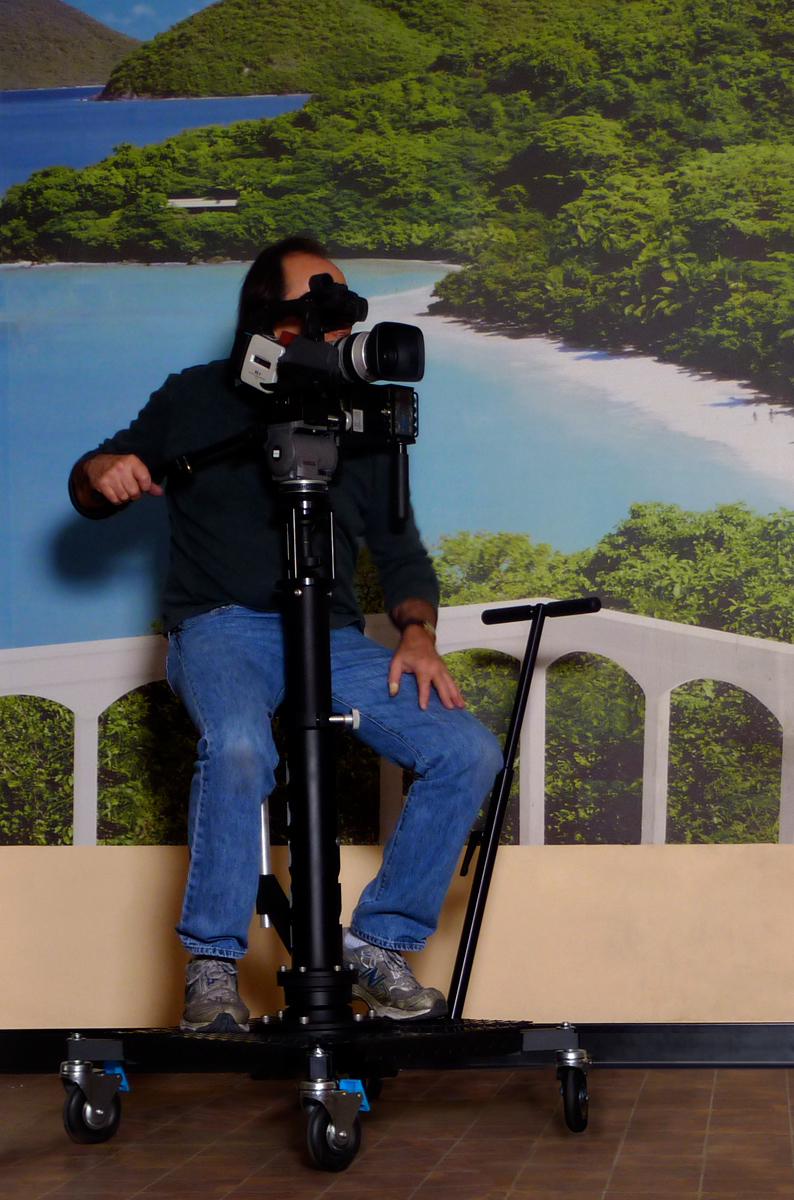
A lightweight camera dolly with floor wheels

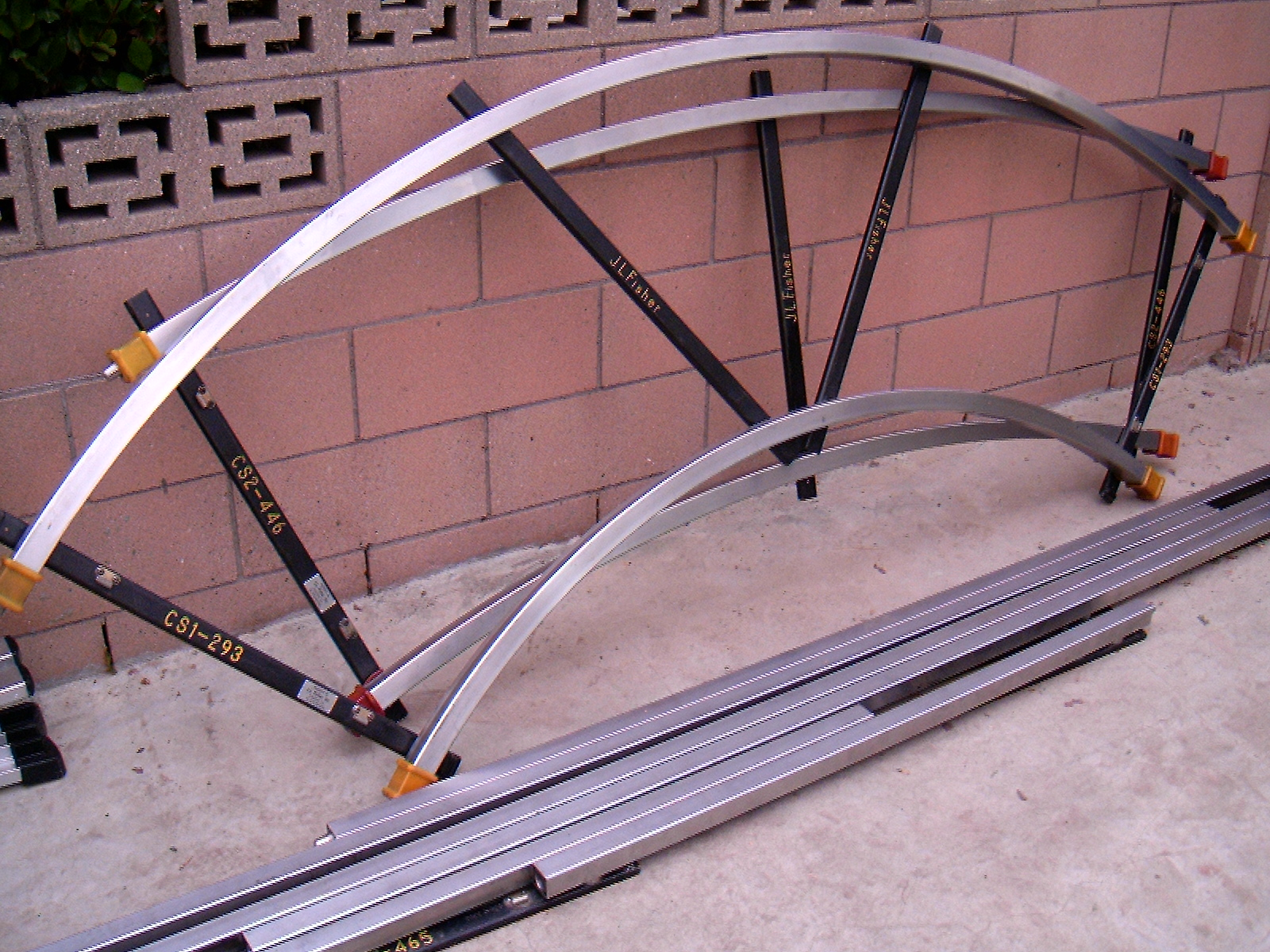
Examples of steel dolly track

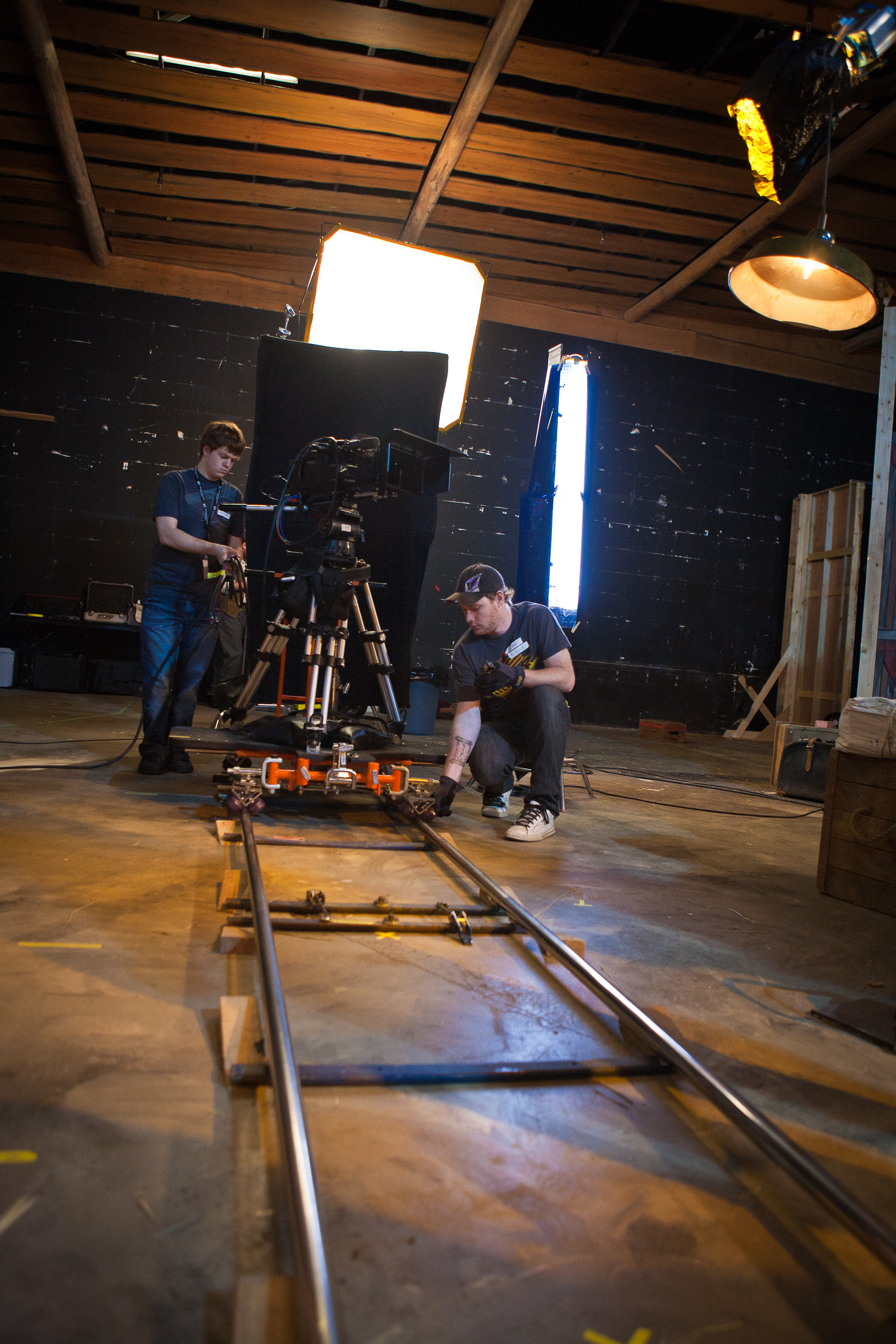
A skateboard dolly (with tripod mounted on top)

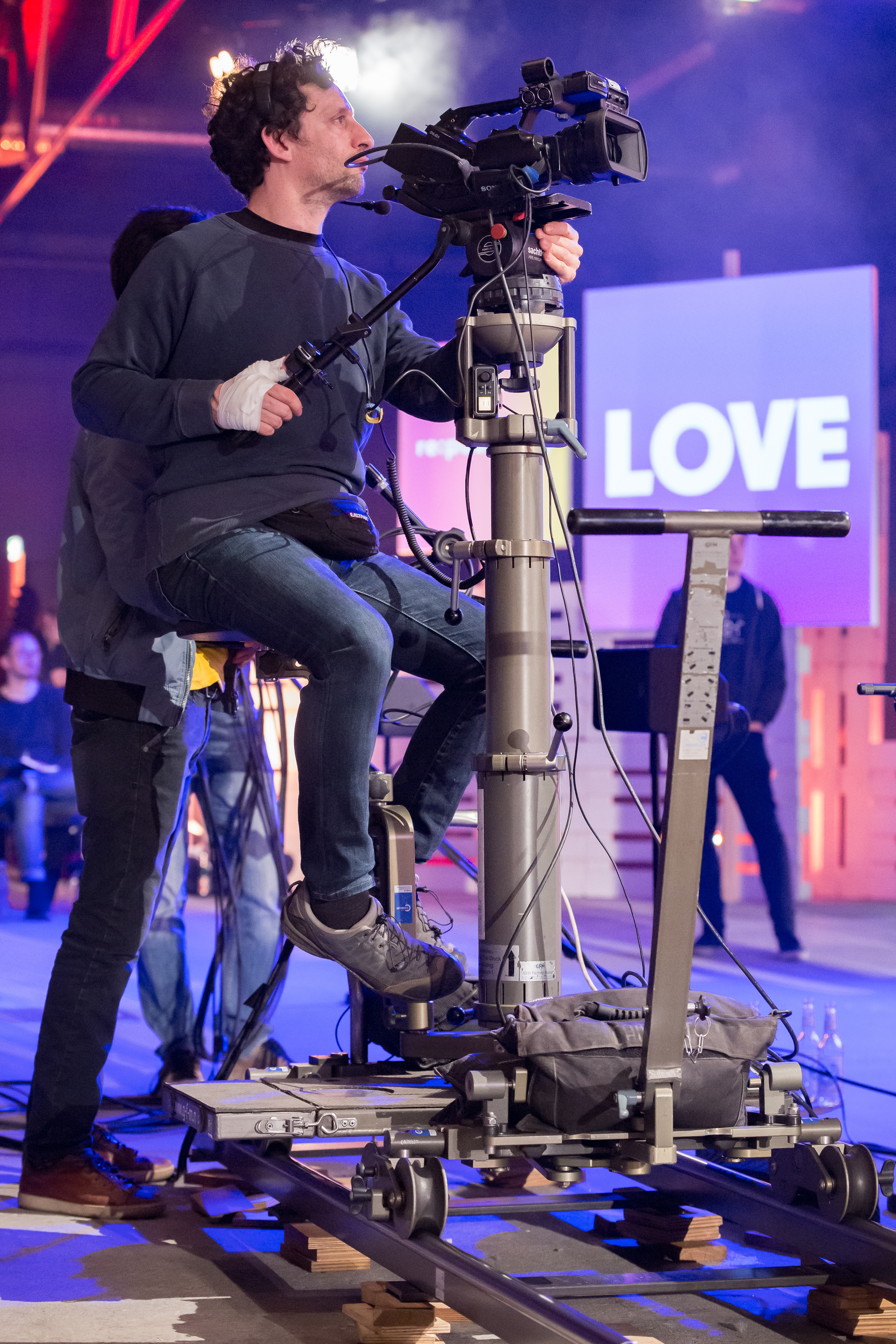
A camera dolly on steel tracks during a conference

== See also ==
- Dolly zoom
