= Best boy =

Film crew position overseeing lighting or grips

In a film crew, there are two kinds of best boy: best boy electric (also known as the assistant chief lighting technician) and best boy grip (also known as the 2nd company grip). They are assistants to their department heads, the gaffer (in charge of electricals) and the key grip (lighting and rigging), respectively. In short, the best boy acts as the foreman for the department. A woman who performs these duties may be called best girl.

== Job responsibilities ==
Best boys are responsible for the day-to-day operation of the lighting or grip department. Their many responsibilities include the hiring, scheduling, and management of crew; the renting, ordering, inventory, and returning of equipment; workplace safety and maintaining discipline within their department; completing timecards and other paperwork; stocking of expendables; loading and unloading production trucks; planning and implementing the lighting or rigging of locations and/or sound stages; coordinating with rigging crews and additional photography units (if applicable); handling relations with the other production departments; overseeing the application of union rules (where relevant); and serving as the day-to-day representative of the department with the unit production manager and coordinator of their department.

The best boy also commonly accompanies or stands in for the key grip or gaffer during technical scouts. During shooting, the best boy may also cover for the key grip or gaffer when he or she is on a break or otherwise away from the set.

On films with very small crews, the electricals (lighting) department often consists of only a gaffer, a best boy, and a few electricians. The grip department may include only a key grip, a best boy, and a few grips. Large-scale productions such as major films commonly include full-time rigging and second unit crews, and in total may hire many dozens of grips or electricians at one time.

== Etymology ==
It is unclear why this term came to be used as a job title on film sets. According to the Oxford English Dictionary, "It has been suggested that it originated as a term for a master's most able apprentice, or alternatively that it was transferred from earlier use for a member of a ship's crew, but confirmatory evidence for either of these theories appears to be lacking." The earliest known appearance of the phrase in print is 1931 from the Albuquerque Journal: "Among the electricians ... the department head is the gaffer, his first assistant is the best boy."

As the gaffer is sometimes credited as the chief lighting technician, the best boy electric is sometimes credited as the "assistant chief lighting technician".

The title is accepted for use in credits by the BBC.

Recently, some film crews have begun adopting gender-neutral terms for job titles, with one example being lead electric as a replacement for the term "best boy" in the electrical department. In 2024, the International Alliance of Theatrical Stage Employees has most recently adopted the terms assistant chief lighting technician and 2nd company grip for the electric and grip departments, respectively.

== Usage outside English ==
Many French-language films made in Canada use Best Boy in the credits. The term has been known to appear in the credits of some French films made in France, but it has not been known to appear in Belgian or Swiss films.

German TV and film crews regularly use the term, because no equivalent phrase exists in German.

In Icelandic cinema credits, a best boy is occasionally called besti drengurinn ("the best boy").
