= Gaffer (occupation) =

Chief lighting technician in film and TV

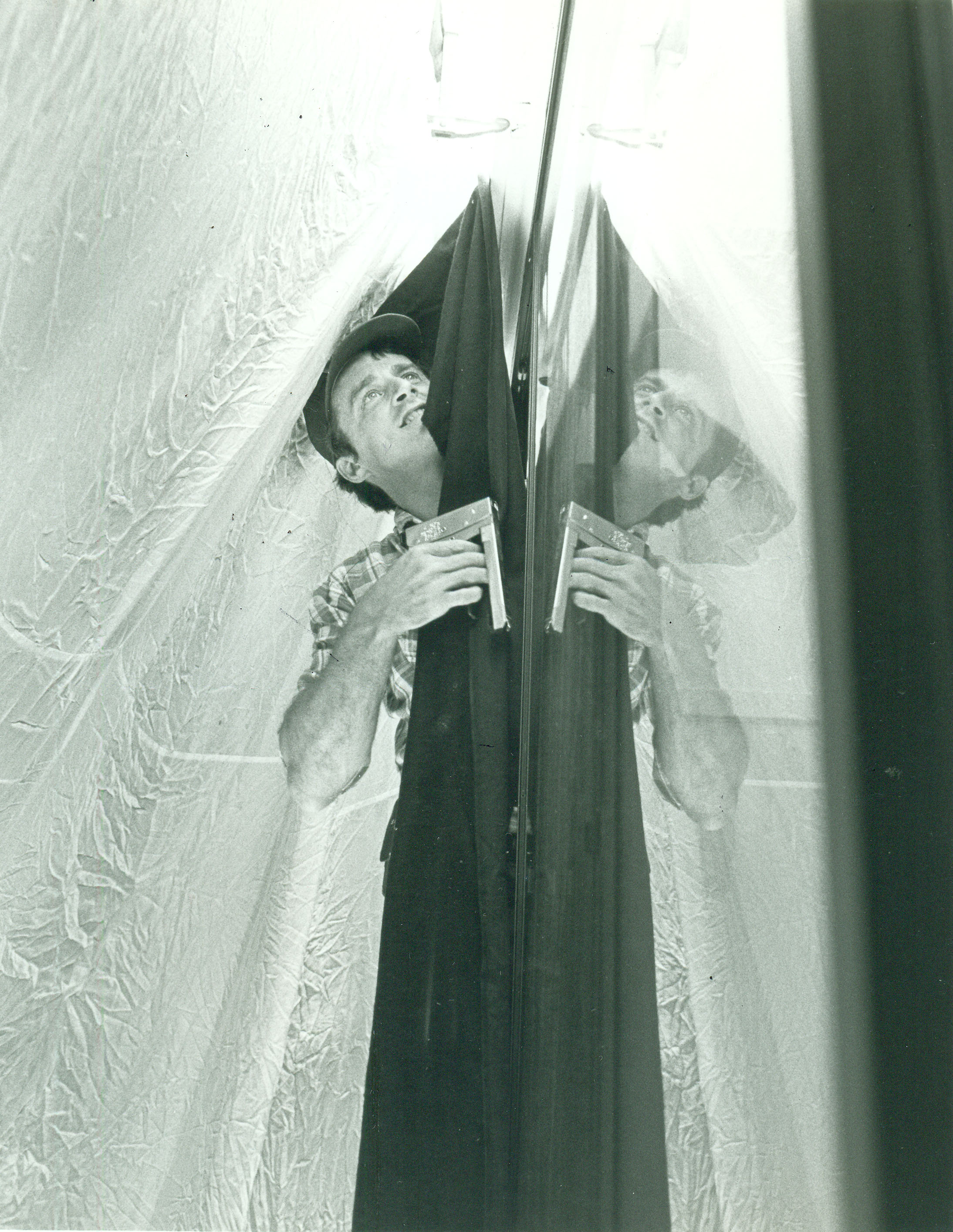
Gaffer Patrick Shellenberger in a production photograph on the set of Dim Sum: A Little Bit of Heart

In film and television crews, the gaffer or chief lighting technician is the head electrician, responsible for the execution (and sometimes the design) of the lighting plan for a production. The gaffer's assistant is the best boy electric.

== Etymology ==
There are several possible explanations for the history of the term gaffer.

One possibility is that the term originally referred to the moving of overhead equipment, or before electricity and in Shakespeare-era play theatres, lighting louvres to control lighting levels using a long pole with a wide grappling hook on its end, called a gaff.

Another potential origin is as a contraction of "godfather", originally applied by country people to an elderly man, or one whose position entitled him to respect; the female equivalent was "gammer", a contraction of "godmother". Both words are found in the comic play Gammer Gurton's Needle, printed in 1575 but possibly written earlier.

In this etymology, "gaffer" later became used more generally for a "master" or "governor", and by 1841 was applied to foremen and supervisors of gangs of workmen.

In any case, it has been applied specifically to the chief electrician on a film set since the 1920s. The Oxford English Dictionary includes a citation from Picture-Play Magazine of 1926 and a 1929 book on motion picture production also uses the term.

== Role ==
The gaffer is responsible for managing lighting, including associated resources such as labor, lighting instruments and electrical equipment under the direction of the director of photography (DP, DOP or Cinematographer) or, in television, the lighting director (LD).

The DP/LD is responsible for the overall lighting design, but delegates the implementation of the design to the gaffer and the key grip. The key grip is the head grip, in charge of the labor and non-electrical equipment used to support and modify the lighting. Grip equipment includes stands, flags and gobos. The gaffer will usually have an assistant called a best boy and, depending on the size of the job, crew members who are called "set lighting technicians" or "electricians", although not all of them are trained as electricians in the usual sense of the term.

== Gaffer tape ==
The name of the position gives its name by association to gaffer tape, a strong cloth-backed adhesive tape used within the film and TV industry. Gaffer tape is typically used by set lighting technicians under the supervision of, and not directly by, a gaffer. Many other types of tape are also used in the industry, such as paper tape, pressure-sensitive tape (A.K.A. snot tape), electrical tape, J-LAR, and cloth tape.
