= Tracking shot =

Shot with the camera follows a moving subject

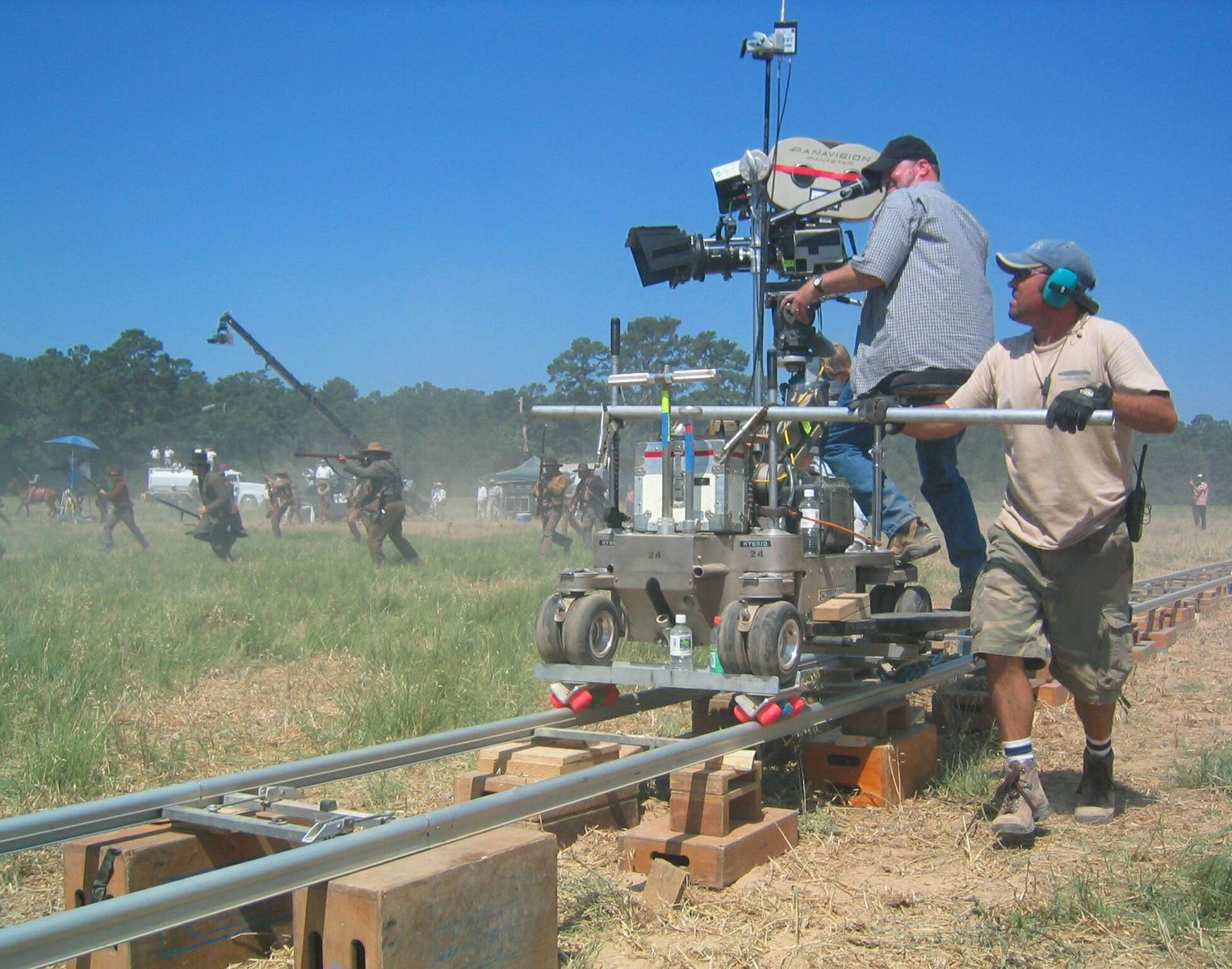
During filming of The Alamo, a tracking shot was used during a battle scene.

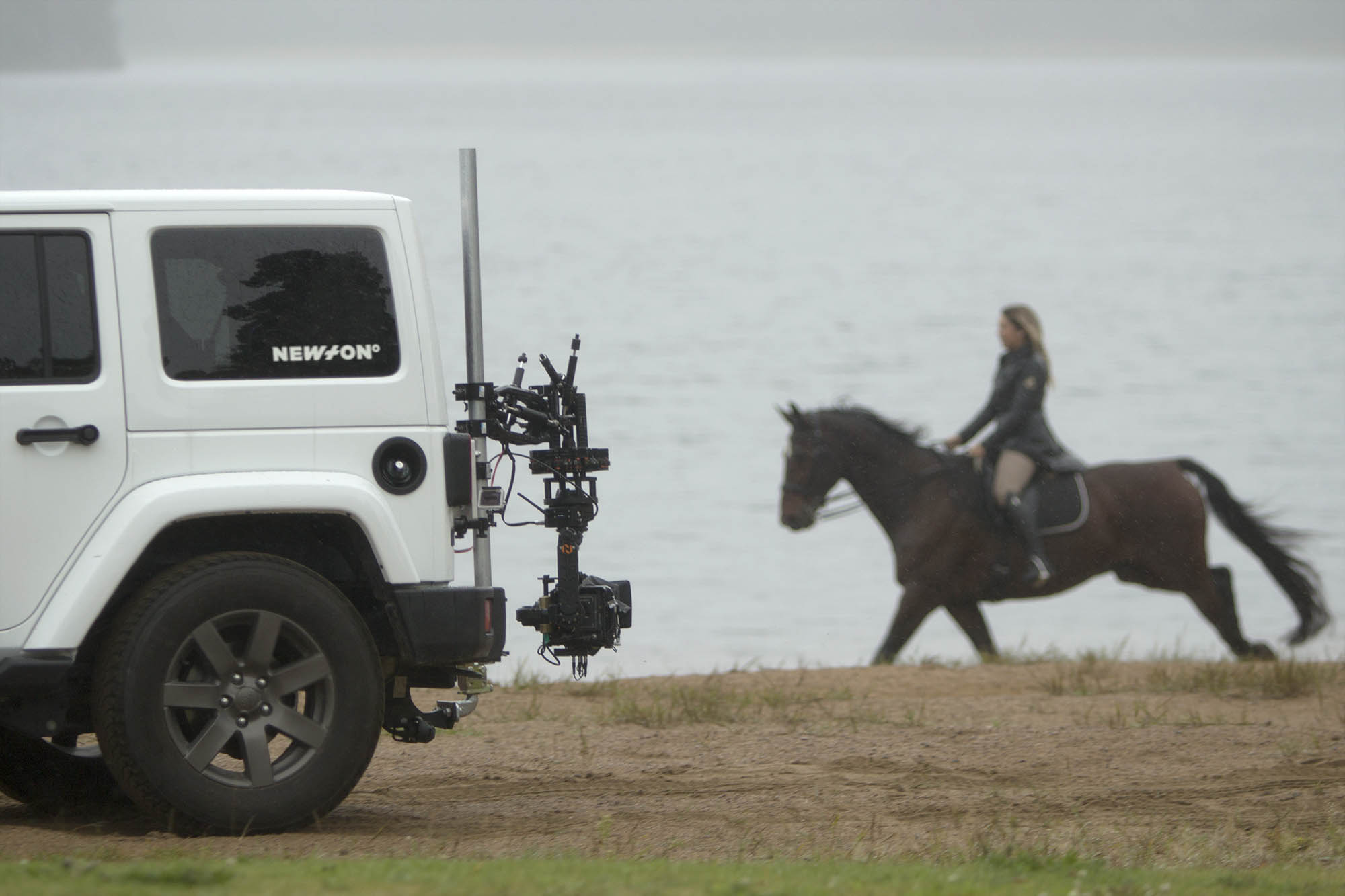
Creating long steady tracking shots with a remote controlled film camera on a Newton stabilized head and a Flowcine Black arm

In cinematography, a tracking shot is any shot where the camera follows backward, forward or moves alongside the subject being recorded. Mostly the camera’s position is parallel to the character, creating a sideways motion, tracking the character. Tracking shots (also called travel shots) differ in motion from dolly shots, where the camera follows behind or before the character, resulting in either an inward or an outward movement. Often the camera is mounted on a camera dolly, which rides on rails similar to a railroad track; in this case, the shot is called a dolly shot. A handheld Steadicam or gimbal may also be used for smaller scale productions. The camera is then pushed along the track while the scene is being filmed, or moved manually when using a handheld rig. The effect can be used to create a sense of movement, to follow a character or object, or a sense of immersion to draw the viewer into the action.

The technique is often used to follow a subject that would otherwise leave the frame, thus also called a following shot, such as an actor or vehicle in motion. A handheld or Steadicam mounted camera following a similar trajectory is called a tracking shot as well. In fact, a tracking shot can use any manual or motorized conveyance, and may include careful planning for passing the camera between vehicles or modes. While the core idea is that the camera moves parallel to its subject, a tracking shot may move in a circular or semi-circular fashion, rotating around its subject while remaining equidistant.

This kind of shot, in which the camera moves along with the subject or in relationship to it, should not be confused with panning, in which the camera remains stationary but pivots right or left on its axis.

== Terminology ==
A tracking shot is a blanket term used to refer to any camera shot with movement, with "trucking shot" and "dolly shot" being tracking shot variations. Generally, a "dolly shot" refers to a specific variation of tracking shot in which the camera moves forwards or backwards with respect to the subject. The term "trucking shot" is less common but usually specifically refers to a shot in which the camera moves left or right in respect to the subject.

== Variant ==
A variant of the tracking shot is the onride video, also known as a phantom ride, where the camera films during a ride on a train, an amusement ride (especially a roller coaster) or another vehicle. Such videos may be used to document the route, and the camera may be fixed to the vehicle or held by a person in the vehicle.

== Use in sporting events ==
The "rail cam" made a public debut in the NHL on November 20, 2006 in the Colorado Avalanche/Dallas Stars hockey game. The Versus cable television network used the camera during the game to test it out for a live use on a nationally broadcast program. The camera was fastened to a rail system that ran on the top of the glass on one side of the ice rink. As the play shifted from end to end, the motorized mount allowed the camera to follow the action, sliding rapidly down the side of the ice. The system was developed by Fletcher Chicago. The experiment was short-lived, and the "rail-cam" is no longer used in NHL hockey games.

For live TV broadcast of sporting events, a remote stabilized camera head is often mounted on a cable suspended system or a vehicle to track the athletes.

== See also ==
- Walk and talk, a film technique which makes use of the tracking shot
- Steadicam
- Process trailer, a trailer designed to be used as a camera platform and/or to carry a car during a tracking shot
- Dolly zoom, moving the camera while zooming to adjust the angle of view
