= Wig (disambiguation) =

A wig is a false hair piece.

Wig or WIG may also refer to:

== Music ==
- Wig!, a 2010 album by Peter Case
- "Wig", a song by the B-52's
- "Wig", a song by DaBaby featuring Moneybagg Yo (2022)

== Other uses ==
- WIG (Warszawski Indeks Giełdowy), an index of the Warsaw Stock Exchange
- Wig (cake), also known as wigg
- WIGS, a producer of short online web series with the tagline "Where It Gets..."
- Wigtownshire, historic county in Scotland, Chapman code WIG
- Wing-in-ground-effect vehicle, a type of low-flying plane
- Wojskowy Instytut Geograficzny (Polish Military Geographical Institute), a maker of topographic maps from 1919 until 1949
- Women in German, an organization for women in German studies

== See also ==
- Whig (disambiguation)
- The Wig (disambiguation)
- Wig Out (disambiguation)
- Wig-wig
- Wigan (disambiguation)
- Wigg (disambiguation)
- Wigtown, Scotland
- Wigwag (disambiguation)
- Wigwam (disambiguation)
