= Wigan (disambiguation) =

Wigan is a town in Greater Manchester, England.

Wigan may also refer to:

== Places ==
- Metropolitan Borough of Wigan, a metropolitan borough of Greater Manchester, in North West England
- Wigan (UK Parliament constituency), a constituency represented in the House of Commons of the Parliament of the United Kingdom
- Wigan Urban Area, an urbanised area containing Wigan in Greater Manchester and Skelmersdale in West Lancashire
- Wigan Rural District, a rural district in Lancashire, England from 1894 to 1974
- County Borough of Wigan, a local government district from 1889 to 1974 centred on Wigan in the northwest of England

== People ==
- Wigan (surname)
- William Wigan Harvey (1810–1883), English cleric and academic

== Sport ==
- Wigan Warriors (previously known simply as Wigan), a rugby league football club
- Wigan Athletic F.C., an association football club
- Wigan R.U.F.C., a rugby union club
- Wigan St Patricks, an amateur rugby league club often used as a feeder team for the Wigan Warriors
- Wigan St Judes, an amateur rugby league club also used as a feeder team for the Wigan Warriors
- Wigan United A.F.C., a former association football club active in the 1890s
- Wigan County F.C, a former association football club active from 1897 to 1900
- Wigan Town A.F.C., a former association football club active from 1905 to 1908
- Wigan Borough F.C., a former association football club active from 1919 to 1931
- Wigan Robin Park F.C., a former association football club active from 2005 to 2015

== Other uses ==
- A fabric called wigan (fabric) made by coating cotton cloth with latex rubber to make it waterproof
- According to Ifugao mythology, Wigan is the god of good harvest
- Wiggan, surname
- Wiggans, surname
