= 1856 United States presidential election in Kentucky =

- November 4, 1856
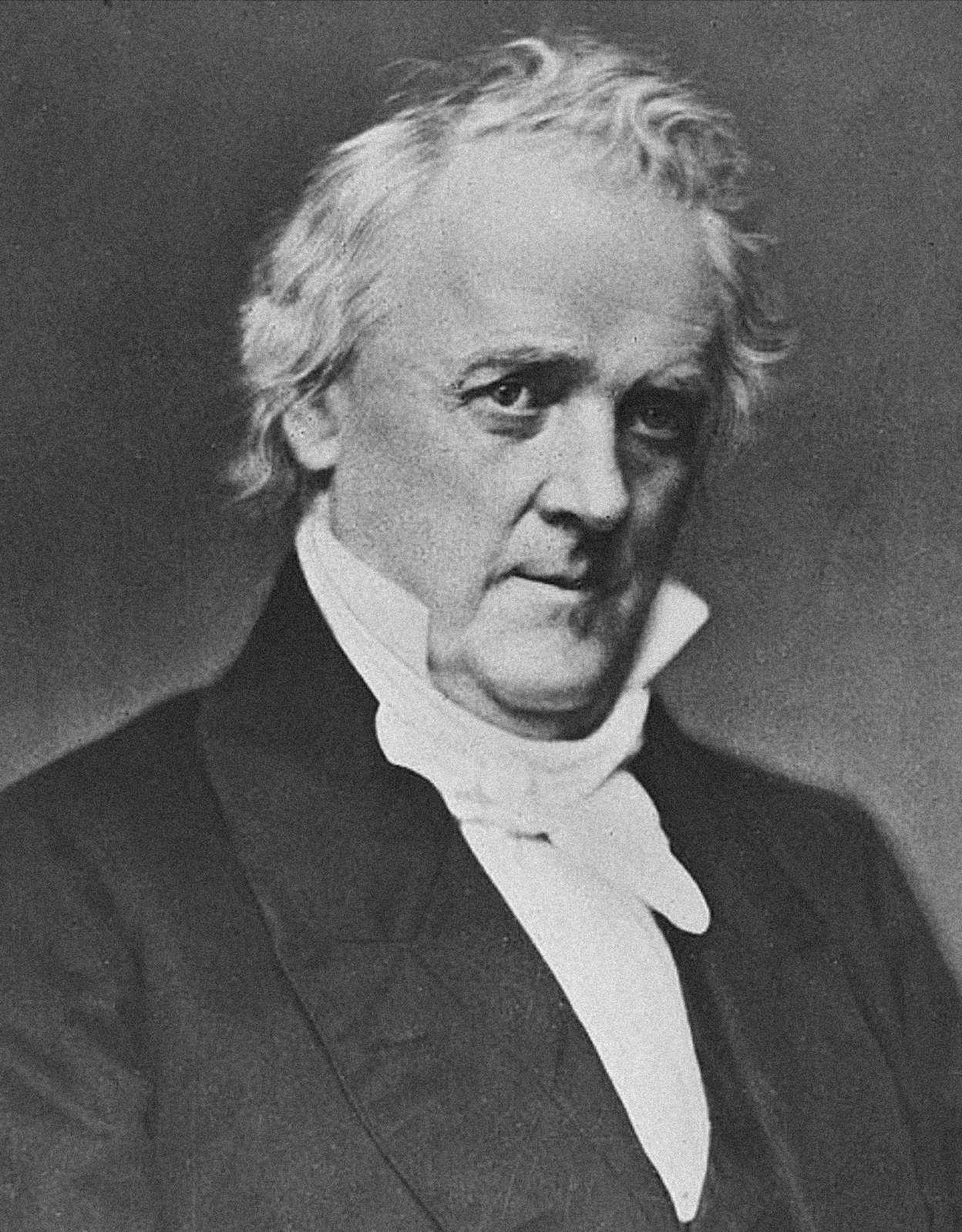

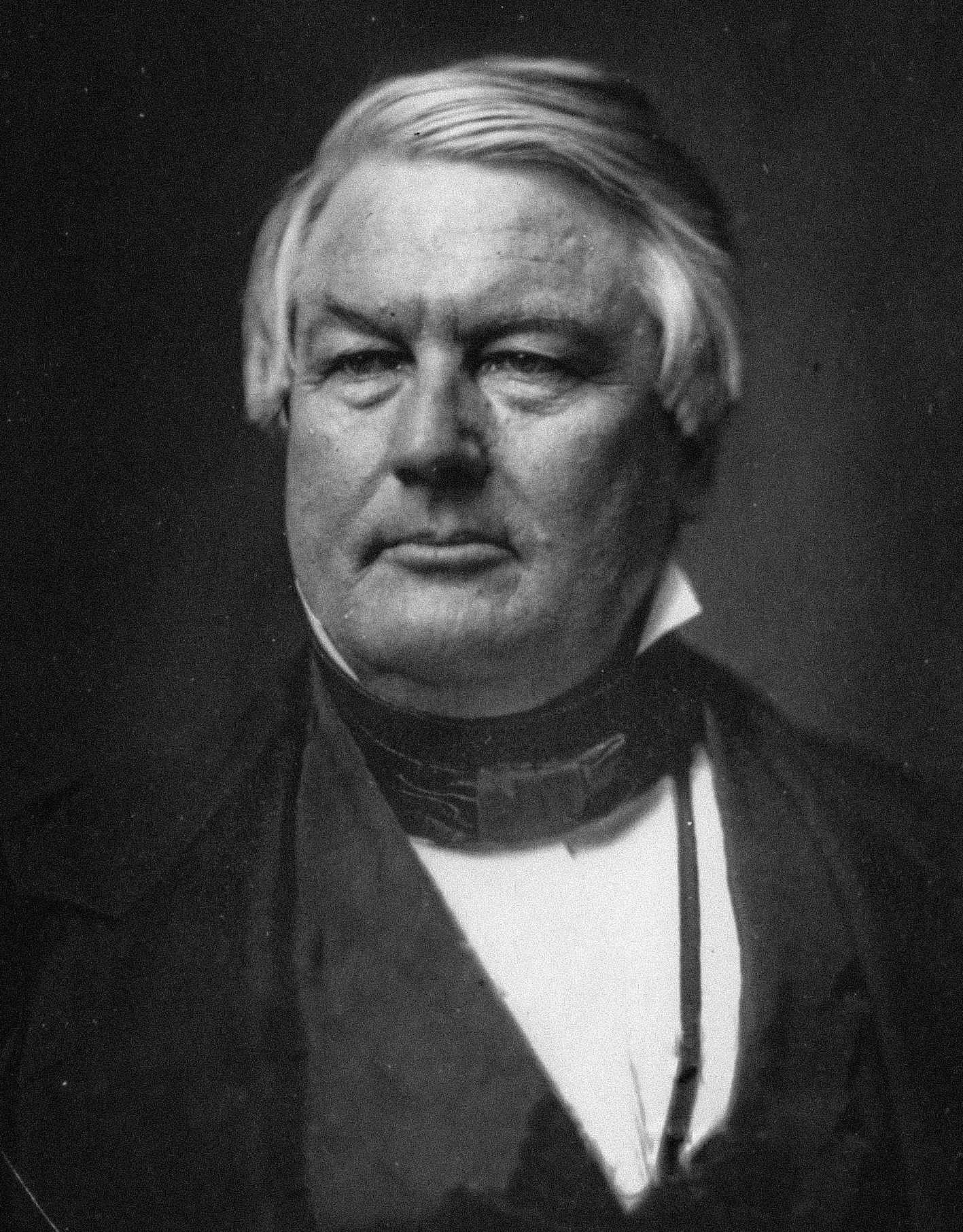
Nominee	James Buchanan	Millard Fillmore
Party	Democratic	Whig
Home state	Pennsylvania	New York
Running mate	John C. Breckinridge	Andrew Jackson Donelson
Electoral vote	12	0
Popular vote	74,642	67,416
Percentage	52.54%	47.46%
County results
Buchanan
50–60%
60–70%
70–80%
80–90%
90–100%
Fillmore
50–60%
60–70%
70–80%
President before election
Franklin Pierce
Democratic
Elected President
James Buchanan
Democratic

The 1856 United States presidential election in Kentucky took place on November 4, 1856, as part of the 1856 United States presidential election. Voters chose 12 representatives, or electors to the Electoral College, who voted for president and vice president.

Kentucky voted for the Democratic candidate, James Buchanan, over American Party candidate Millard Fillmore. Buchanan won Kentucky by a margin of 5.08%. This was the first time the Democrats carried Kentucky since 1828, before the creation of the Whig party. Beginning with this election, Kentucky became a reliably Democratic state, only voting against the party twice (in 1896 and 1924) between the Civil War and World War II.

Republican Party candidate John C. Frémont was not on the ballot in the state.

== Results ==
1856 United States presidential election in Kentucky
Party	Candidate	Running mate	Popular vote		Electoral vote	
Party	Candidate	Running mate	Count	%	Count	%
Democratic	James Buchanan of Pennsylvania	John C. Breckinridge of Kentucky	74,642	52.54%	12	100.00%
Know Nothing	Millard Fillmore of New York	Andrew Jackson Donelson of Tennessee	67,416	47.46%	0	0.00%
Total			142,058	100.00%	12	100.00%

== See also ==
- United States presidential elections in Kentucky
