= 1856 United States presidential election =

Election of James Buchanan

- November 4, 1856

296 members of the Electoral College 149 electoral votes needed to win
- Turnout: 79.4% (▲9.9 pp)
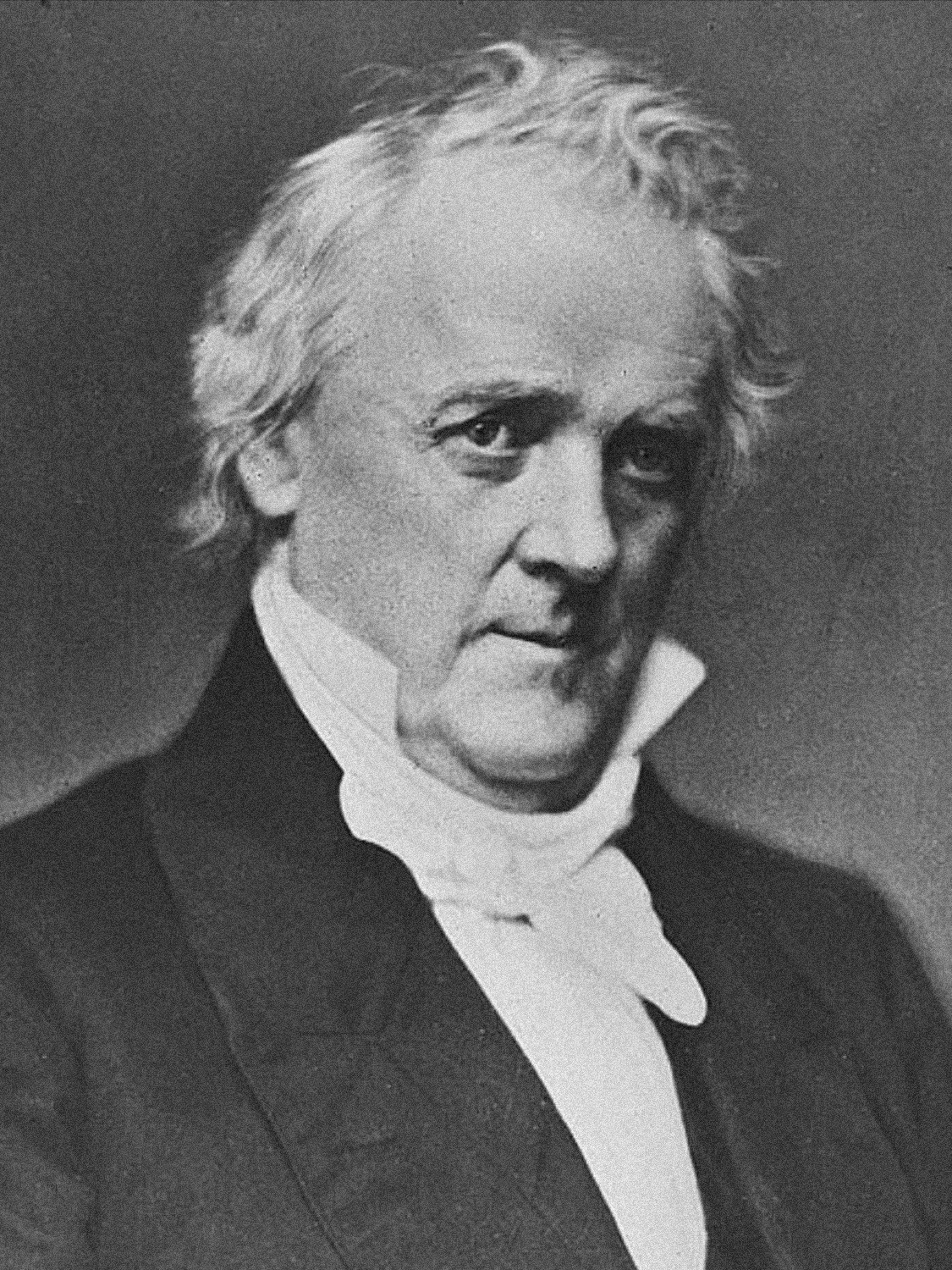

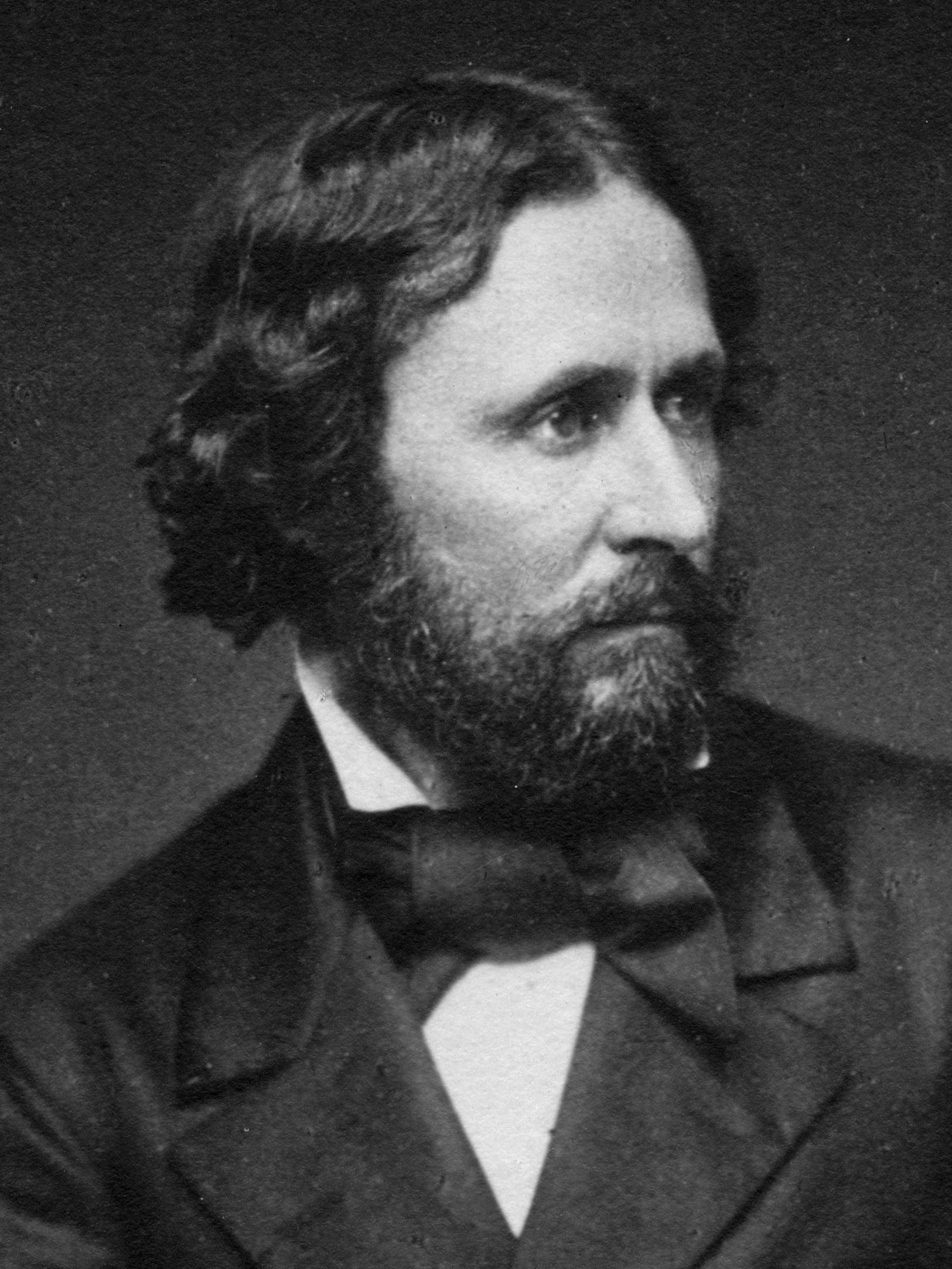

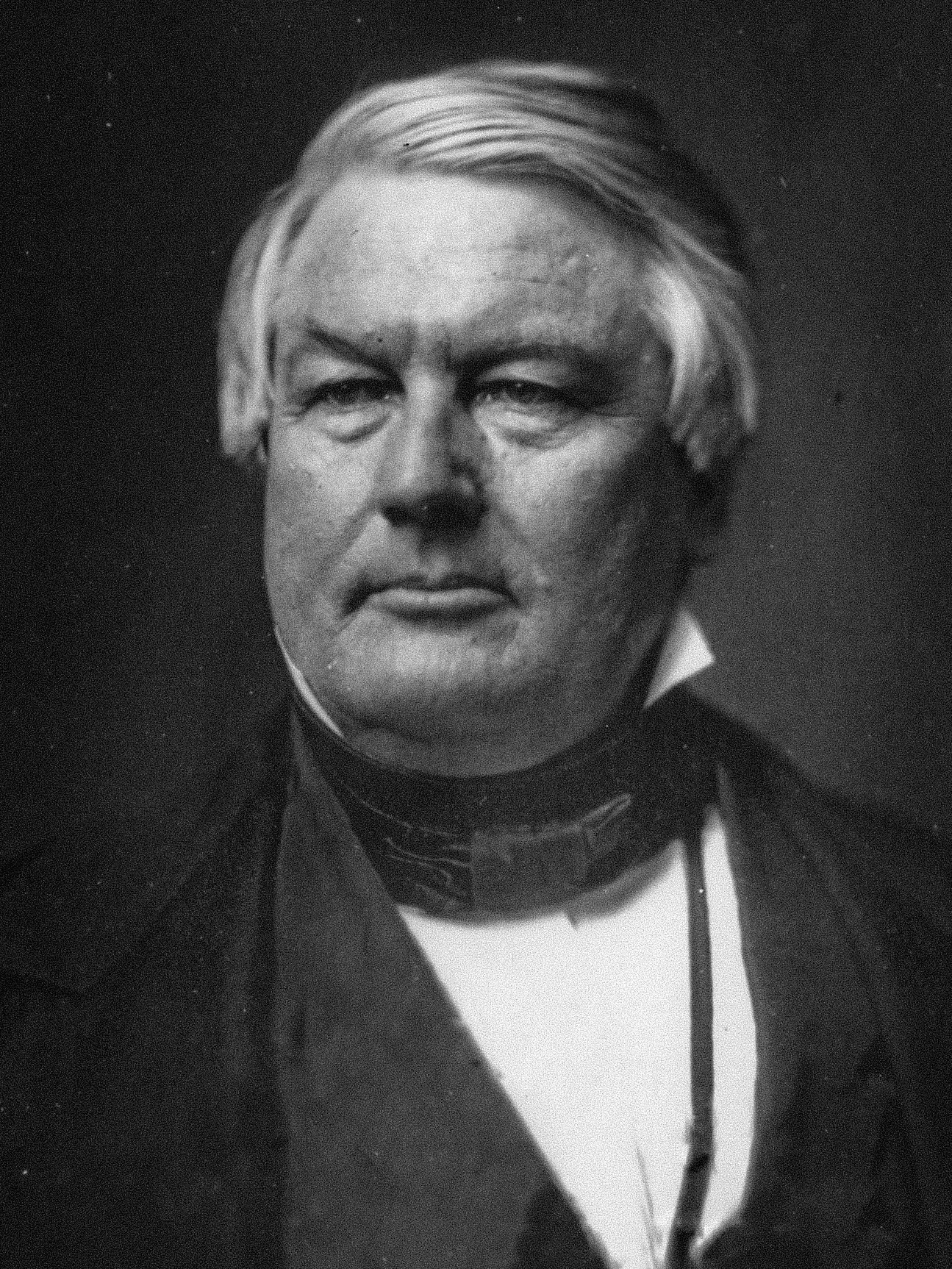
Nominee	James Buchanan	John C. Frémont	Millard Fillmore
Party	Democratic	Republican	American
Alliance		North American	Whig
Home state	Pennsylvania	California	New York
Running mate	John C. Breckinridge	William L. Dayton	Andrew Jackson Donelson
Electoral vote	174	114	8
States carried	19	11	1
Popular vote	1,836,072	1,342,345	873,053
Percentage	45.3%	33.1%	21.5%
- Presidential election results map. Blue denotes states won by Buchanan/Breckinridge, Red by Frémont/Dayton, and Lavender by Fillmore/Donelson. Numbers indicate the number of electoral votes cast by each state.
President before election
Franklin Pierce
Democratic
Elected President
James Buchanan
Democratic

A presidential election was held in the United States on November 4, 1856. Democratic nominee James Buchanan defeated Republican nominee John C. Frémont and Know Nothing/Whig nominee Millard Fillmore. The main issue was the expansion of slavery as facilitated by the Kansas–Nebraska Act of 1854. Buchanan defeated President Franklin Pierce at the 1856 Democratic National Convention for the nomination. Pierce had become widely unpopular in the North because of his support for the pro-slavery faction in the ongoing civil war in territorial Kansas, and Buchanan, a former Secretary of State, had avoided the divisive debates over the Kansas–Nebraska Act by being in Europe as the Ambassador to the United Kingdom.

Slavery was the main issue, and with it the question of the survival of the United States as it then existed. The Democrats were the pro-slavery party. While the new Republican party was hostile to slavery, they limited their efforts to the politically more manageable question of the extension of slavery into federal territories (and its removal from the District of Columbia). The nativist Know Nothings (known formally as the American Party) competed with the Republicans to replace the moribund Whig Party as the primary opposition to the Democrats. They emphasized opposition to Catholic immigrants.

The 1856 Republican National Convention nominated a ticket led by Frémont, an explorer and military officer who had served in the Mexican–American War. The Know Nothings, who ignored slavery and instead emphasized anti-immigration and anti-Catholic policies, nominated a ticket led by former Whig President Millard Fillmore. Domestic political turmoil was a major factor in the nominations of both Buchanan and Fillmore, who appealed in part because of their recent time abroad, when they did not have to take a position on the divisive questions related to slavery.

The Democrats supported expansionist slave-holding policies generally of varying intensities. Southern Democrats were all in favor of the expansion of slavery. Some wanted to obtain Cuba as slave territory, as espoused by the Ostend Manifesto. Northern Democrats called for "popular sovereignty", which in theory would allow the residents in a territory to decide for themselves the legal status of slavery. In practice, in Kansas Territory, it produced a state-level civil war. Frémont opposed the expansion of slavery. Buchanan called that position "extremist", warning that a Republican victory would lead to disunion, a then constant issue of political debate which had already been long discussed and advocated. The Know Nothings attempted to present themselves as the one party capable of bridging the sectional divides. All three major parties found support in the North, but the Republicans had virtually no backing in the South.

Buchanan won a plurality of the popular vote and a majority of the electoral vote, taking all but one slave state and five free states. Frémont won a majority of electoral votes from free states and finished second in the nationwide popular vote, while Fillmore took 21.5% of the popular vote but only carried Maryland. The Know Nothings soon collapsed as a national party, as most of its anti-slavery members joined the Republican Party after the 1857 Dred Scott v. Sandford Supreme Court ruling. This election marked the end of the Second Party System and also proved to be the last Democratic presidential victory until Grover Cleveland in 1884, as Republicans emerged as the dominant party during and after the Civil War.

== Nominations ==
The 1856 presidential election was primarily waged among three political parties, though other parties had been active in the spring of the year. The conventions of these parties are considered below in order of the party's popular vote.

=== Democratic Party nomination ===
1856 Democratic Party ticket
James Buchanan	John C. Breckinridge
for President	for Vice President
U.S. Minister to Great Britain (1853–1856)	U.S. Representative for Kentucky's 8th (1851–1855)

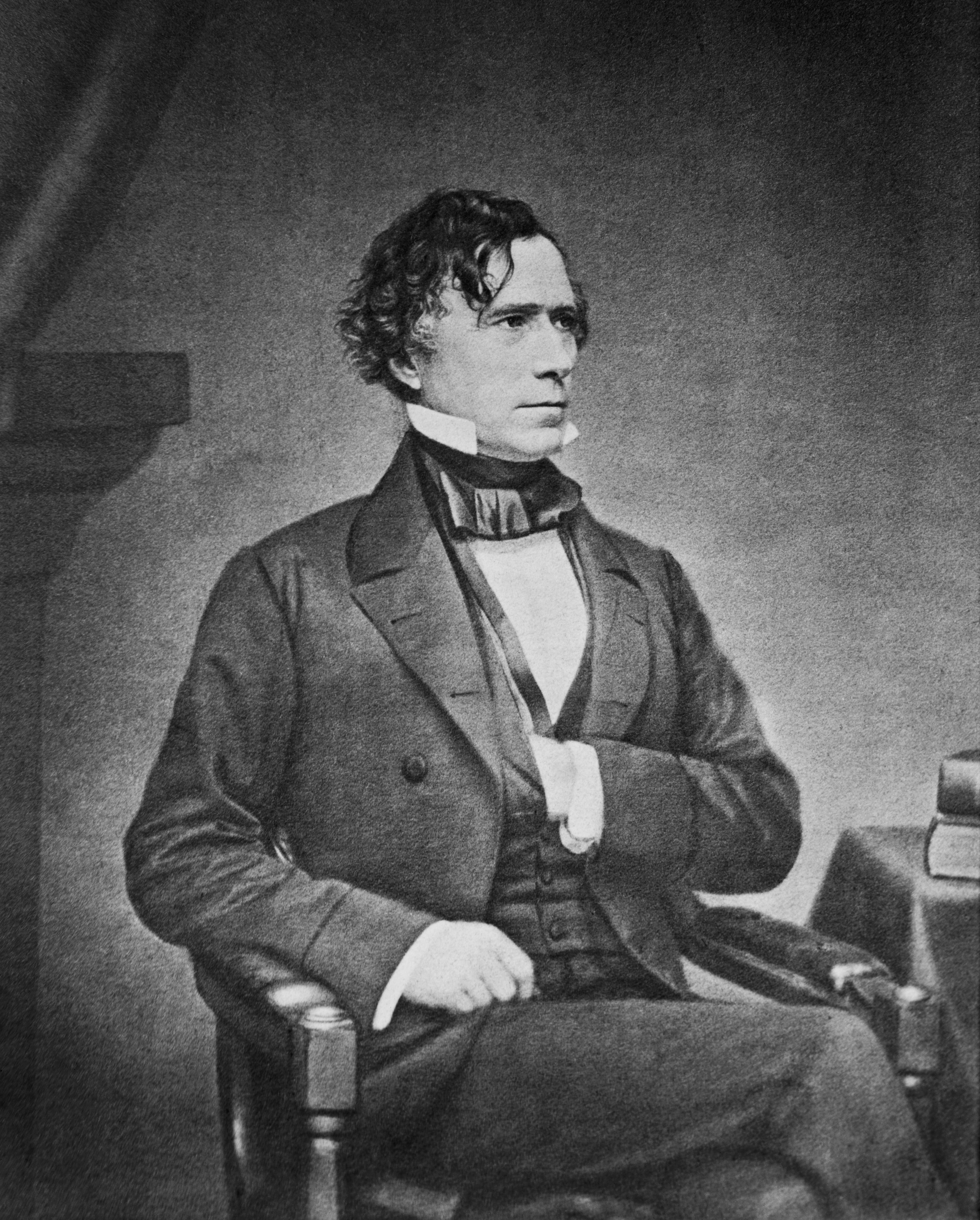
Franklin Pierce, the incumbent president in 1856, whose term expired on March 4, 1857 after losing renomination

Democratic candidates:

- James Buchanan, Minister to Great Britain and former Secretary of State
- Franklin Pierce, President of the United States
- Stephen Douglas, U.S. Senator from Illinois
- Lewis Cass, U.S. Senator and 1848 presidential nominee from Michigan
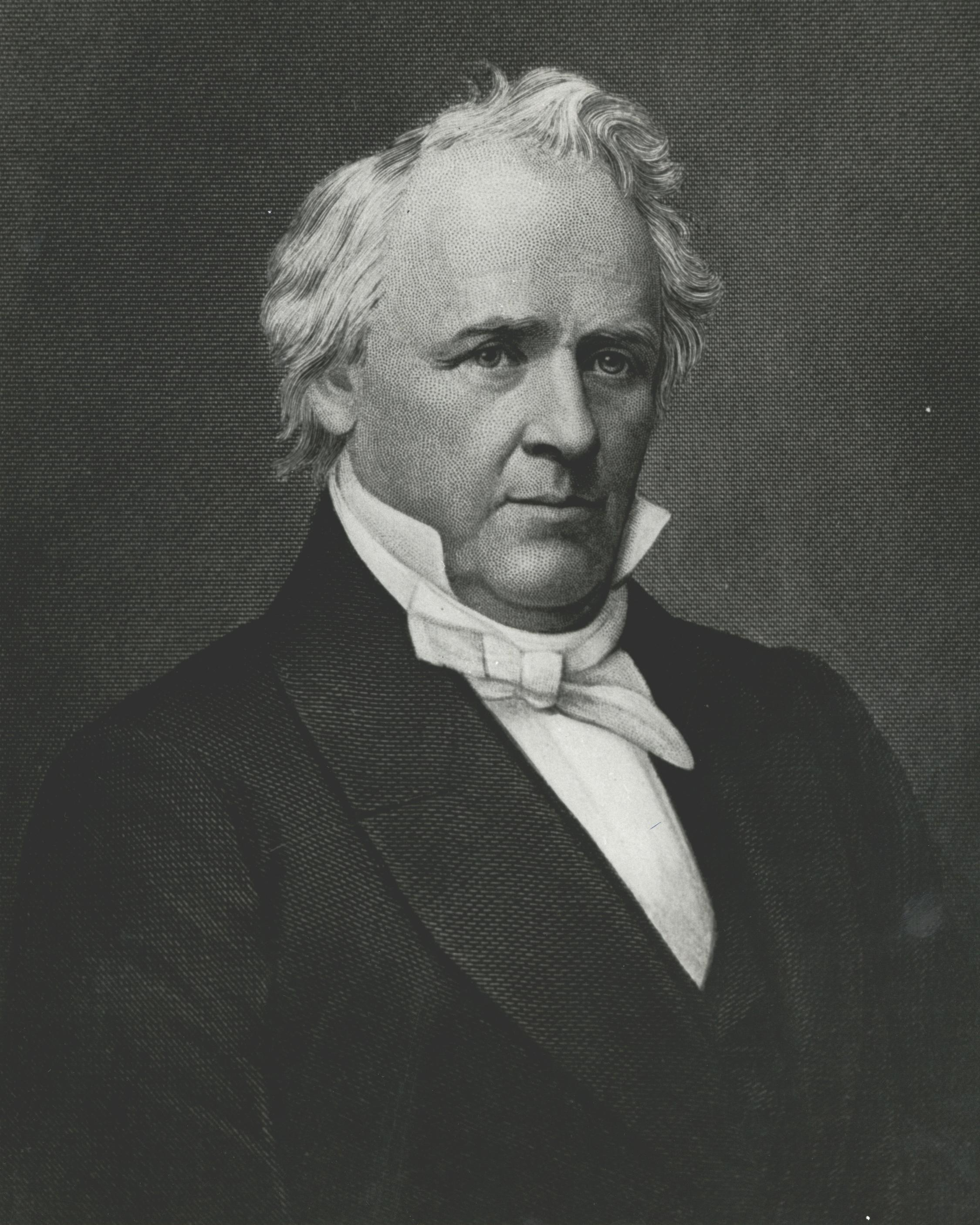
Minister to Great Britain and former United States Secretary of State
James Buchanan

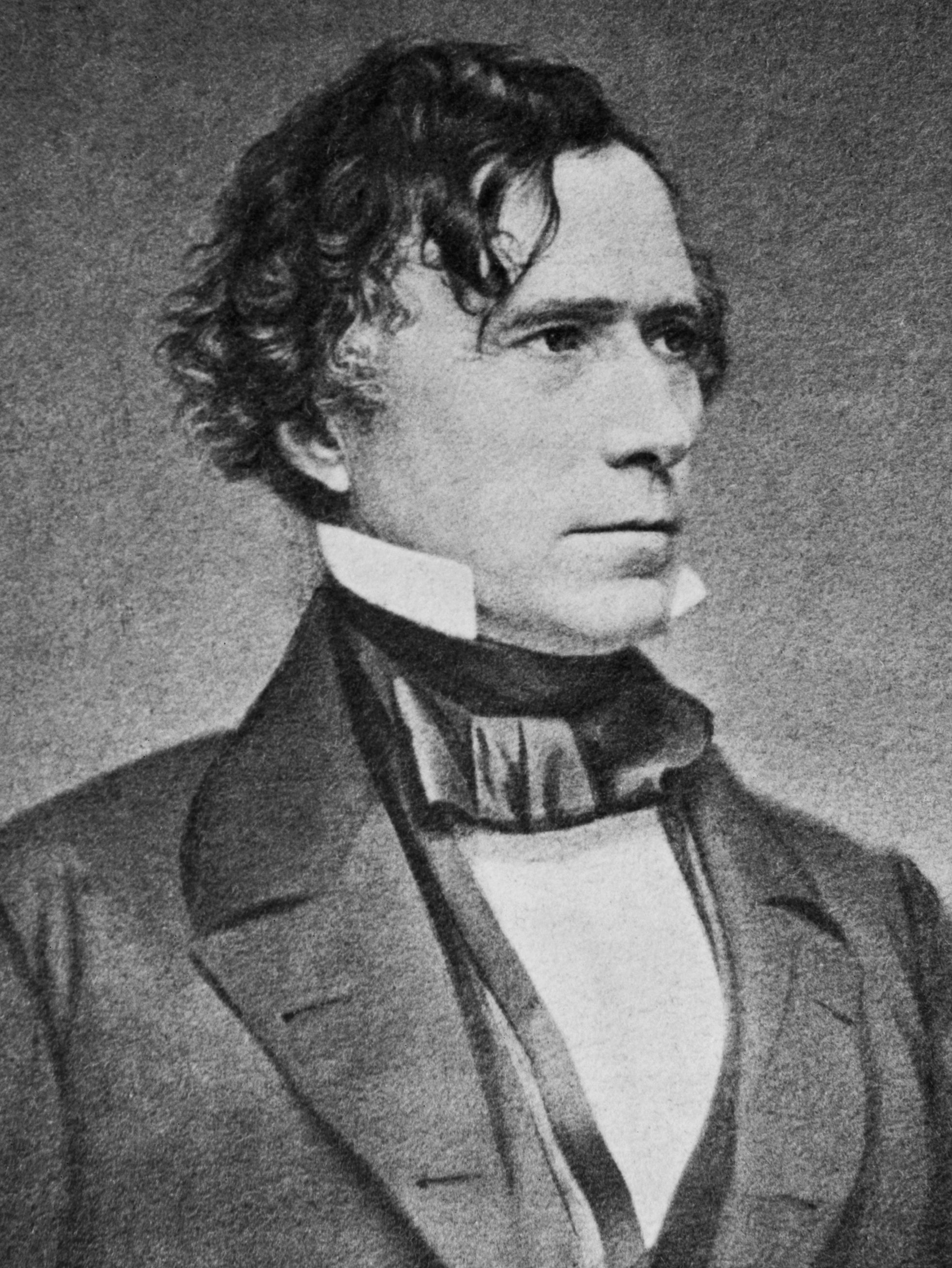
President Franklin Pierce
(Name Withdrawn on the 15th Ballot in favor of Stephen Douglas)

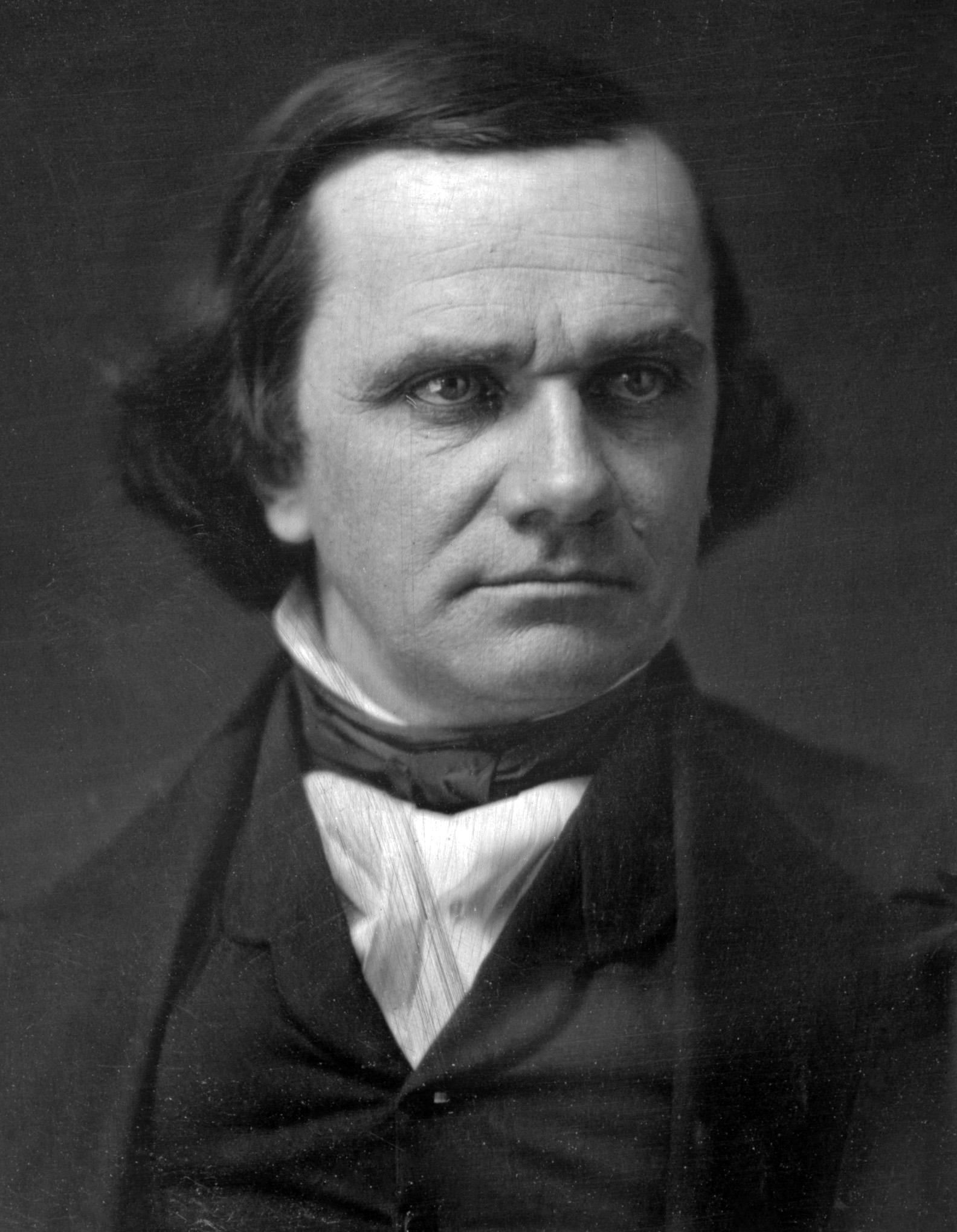
Senator Stephen A. Douglas from Illinois
(Name Withdrawn on the 17th Ballot in favor of James Buchanan)

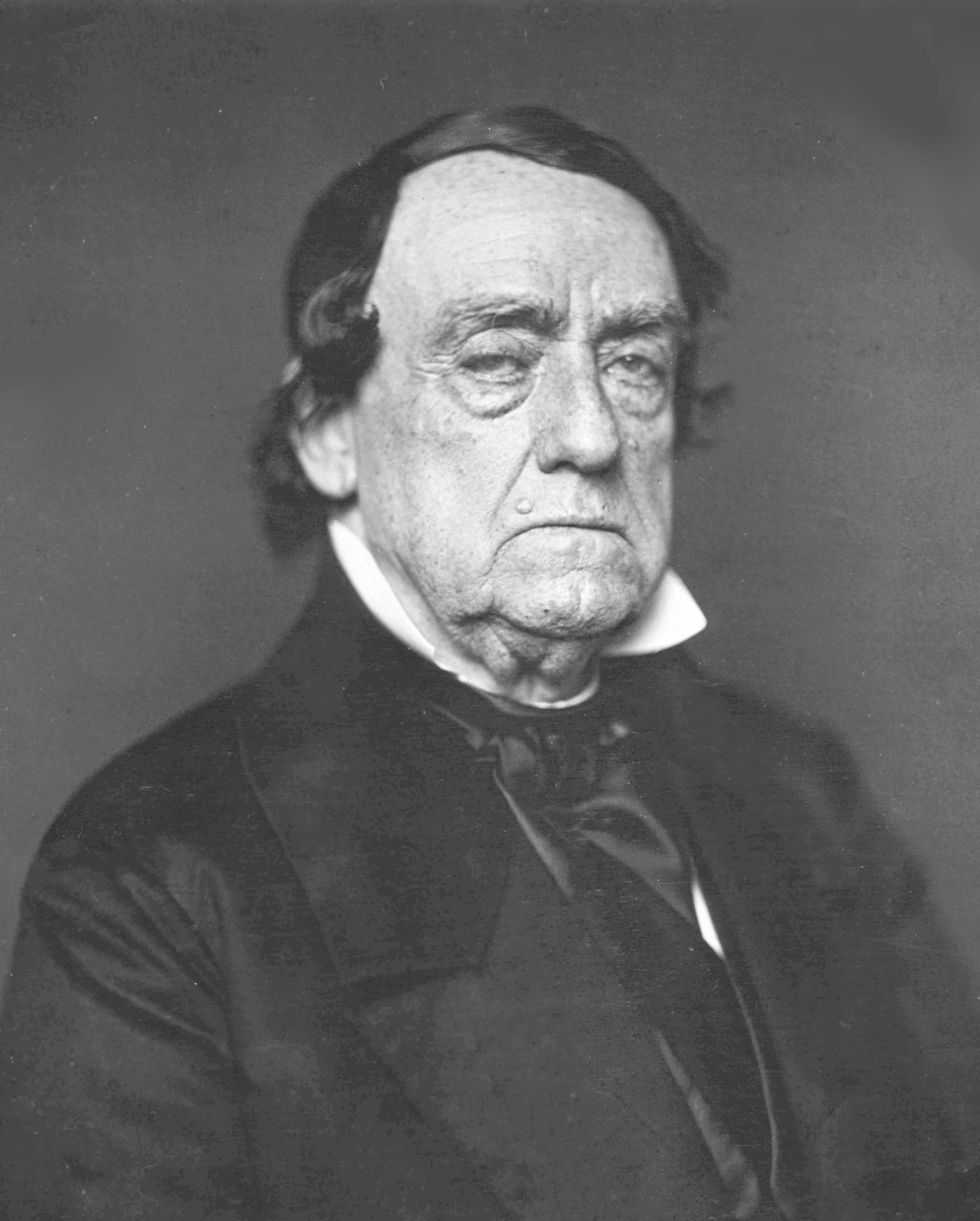
Senator Lewis Cass from Michigan

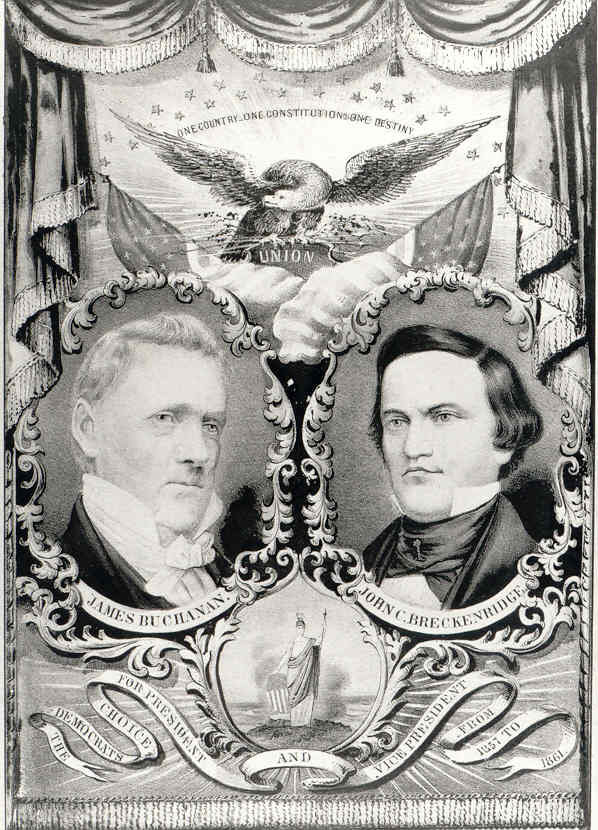
Buchanan/Breckinridge campaign poster

The Democratic Party was wounded from its devastating losses in the 1854–1855 midterm elections. Senator Stephen A. Douglas of Illinois, who had sponsored the Kansas-Nebraska Act, entered the race in opposition to President Franklin Pierce. The Pennsylvania delegation continued to sponsor its favorite son Buchanan.

The Seventh Democratic National Convention was held in Smith and Nixon's Hall in Cincinnati, Ohio, on June 2 to 6, 1856. The delegates were deeply divided over slavery. On the first ballot, Buchanan placed first with 135.5 votes to 122.5 for Pierce, 33 for Douglas, and 5 for Senator Lewis Cass, who had been the presidential nominee in 1848. With each succeeding ballot, Buchanan gradually extended his lead, while Douglas began making significant gains at Pierce's expense. By the end of the first day, with 14 ballots having been completed, it was clear that Pierce would not be nominated for a second term, and he withdrew his name from contention. On the 15th ballot, most of Pierce's delegates shifted to Douglas in an attempt to stop Buchanan, but Douglas withdrew when it became clear Buchanan had the support of the majority of those at the convention, also fearing that his continued participation might lead to divisions within the party that could endanger its chances in the general election. For the first time in American history someone who had been elected president was denied re-nomination after seeking it.

A host of candidates were nominated for the vice presidency, but a number of them attempted to withdraw themselves from consideration, among them the eventual nominee, John C. Breckinridge of Kentucky. Breckinridge, besides having been selected as an elector, was also supporting former Speaker of the House Linn Boyd for the vice presidential nomination. However, following a draft effort led by the delegation from Vermont, Breckinridge was nominated on the second ballot.

=== Republican Party nomination ===
1856 Republican Party ticket
John C. Frémont	William L. Dayton
for President	for Vice President
U.S. Senator from California (1850–1851)	U.S. Senator from New Jersey (1842–1851)

Republican candidates:

- John C. Frémont, former United States Senator from California
- John McLean, Associate Justice of the United States Supreme Court
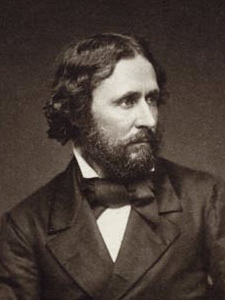
Former Senator John C. Frémont from California

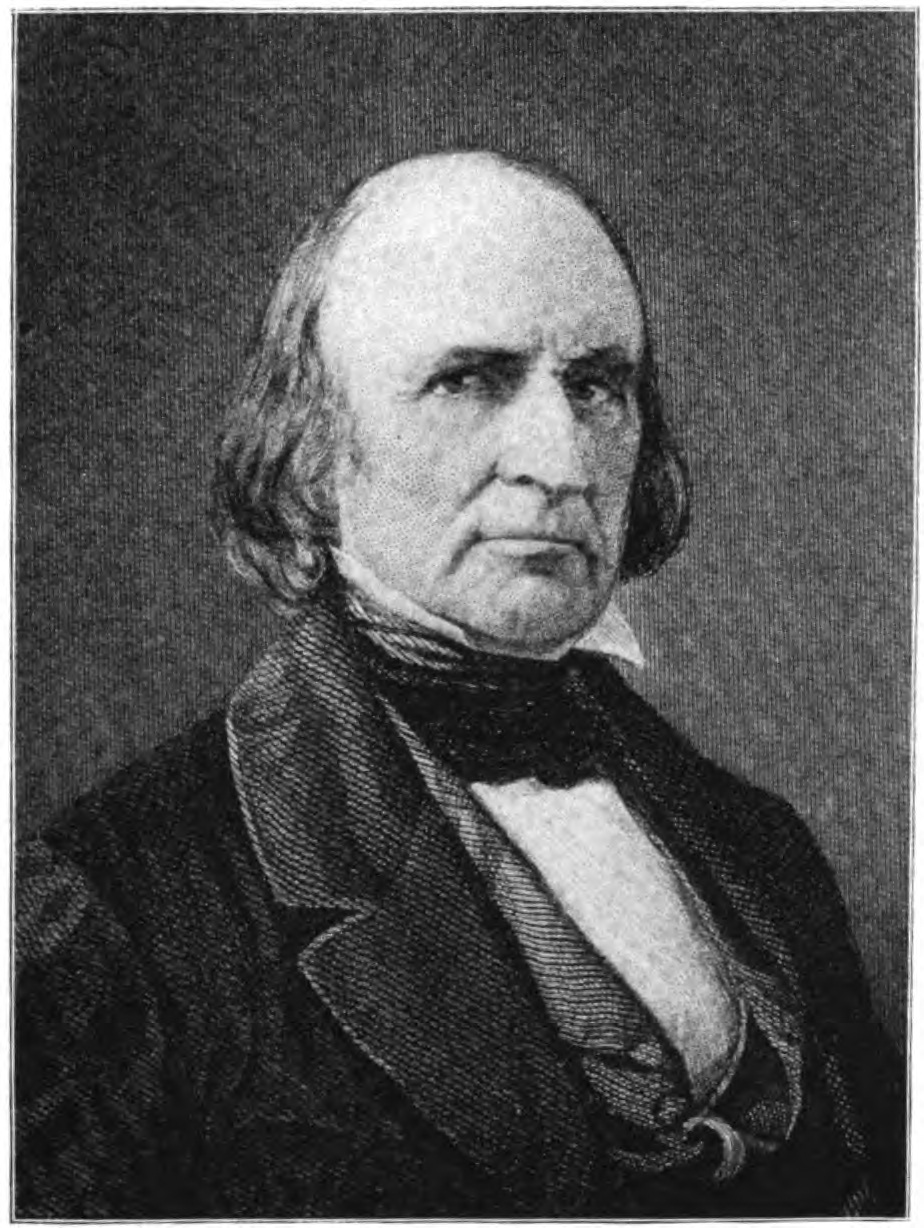
Supreme Court Associate Justice John McLean from Ohio

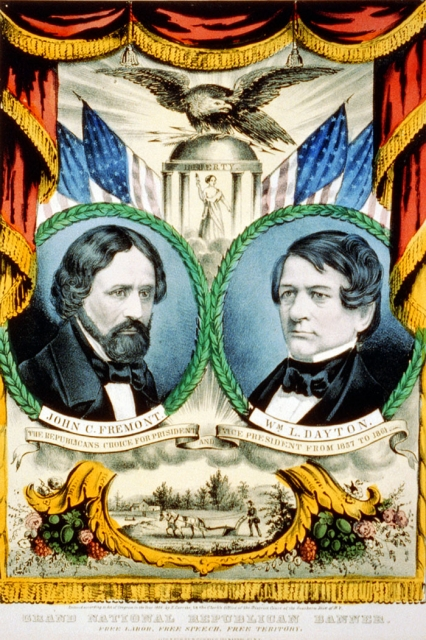
Fremont/Dayton campaign poster

The Republican Party was formed in early 1854 to oppose the Kansas-Nebraska Act. During the midterm elections of 1854–1855, the Republican Party was one of the patchwork of anti-administration parties contesting the election, but they were able to win thirteen seats in the House of Representatives for the 34th Congress. However, the party collaborated with other disaffected groups and gradually absorbed them. In the elections of 1855, the Republican Party won three governorships.

The first Republican National Convention was held in the Musical Fund Hall in Philadelphia, Pennsylvania, on June 17 to 19, 1856. The convention approved an anti-slavery platform that called for congressional sovereignty in the territories, an end to polygamy in Mormon settlements, and federal assistance for a transcontinental railroad—a political outcome of the Pacific Railroad Surveys. John C. Frémont, John McLean, William Seward, Salmon Chase, and Charles Sumner all were considered by those at the convention, but the latter three requested that their names be withdrawn. Seward and Chase did not feel that the party was yet sufficiently organized to have a realistic chance of taking the White House and were content to wait until the next election. Sumner was in no fit condition to run after being violently assaulted on the Senate floor a month before the convention. McLean's name was initially withdrawn by his manager Rufus Spalding, but the withdrawal was rescinded at the strong behest of the Pennsylvania delegation led by Thaddeus Stevens. Kentucky was the only southern state to have a delegation at the convention. Frémont was nominated for president overwhelmingly on the formal ballot, and William L. Dayton was nominated for vice president over Abraham Lincoln.

=== American (Know-Nothing) Party nomination ===
1856 American Party ticket
Millard Fillmore	Andrew Jackson Donelson
for President	for Vice President
13th President of the United States (1850–1853)	2nd U.S. Envoy to Prussia (1846–1849)

American Party candidates:

- Millard Fillmore, former President of the United States from New York
- George Law, steamboat entrepreneur from New York
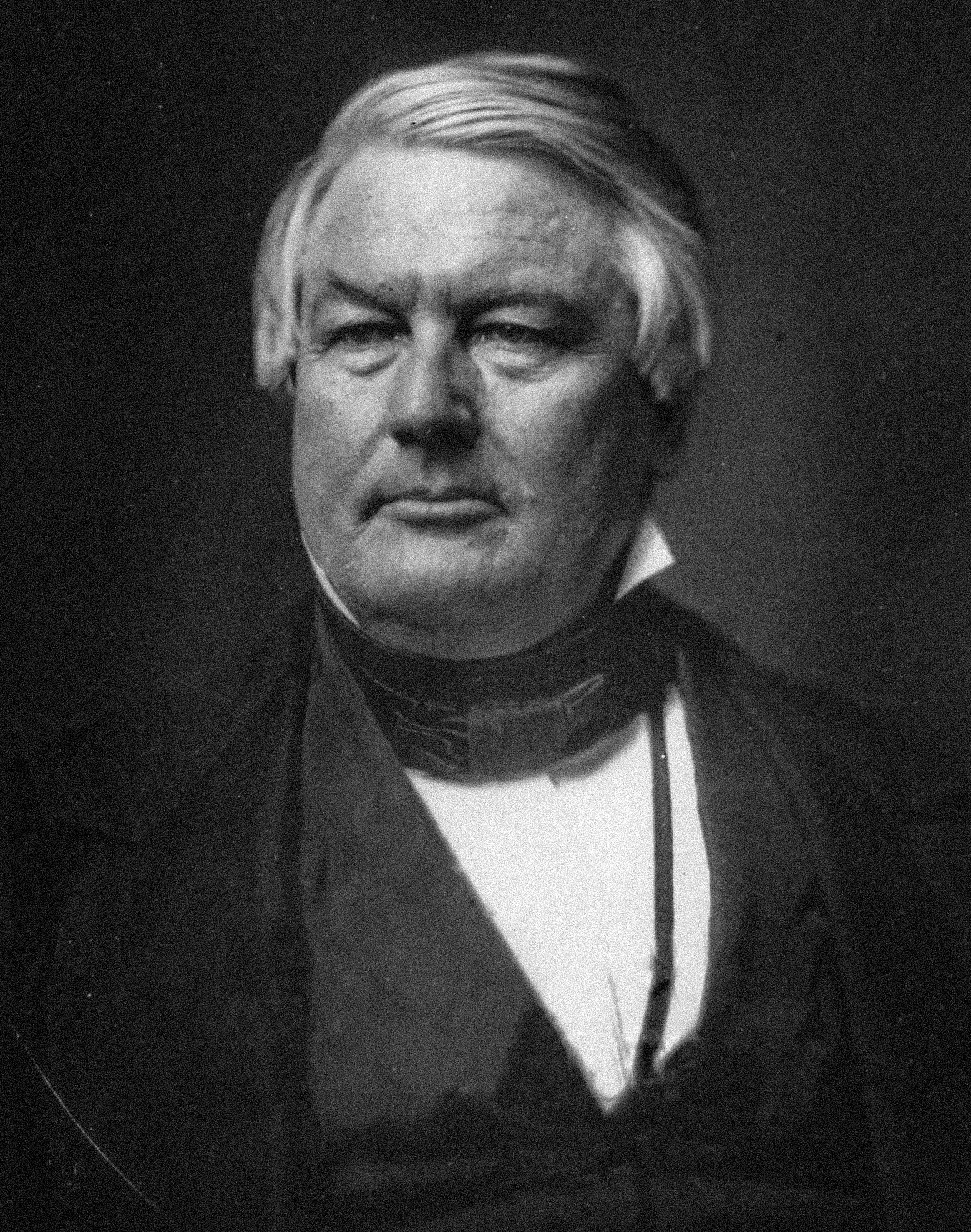
Former President Millard Fillmore
from New York

Steamboat entrepreneur George Law from New York

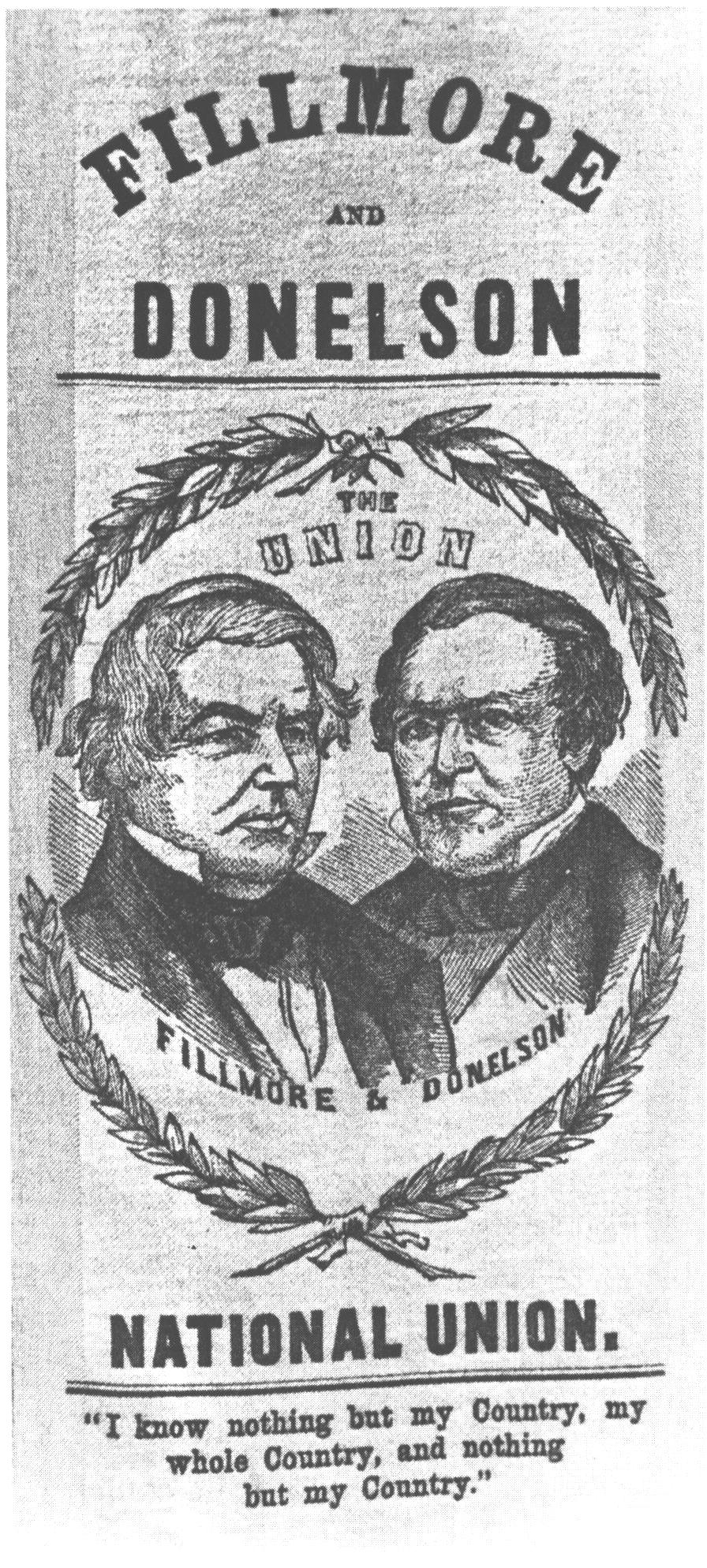
1856 Know-Nothing campaign poster

The American Party, formerly the Native American Party, was the vehicle of the Know Nothing movement. The American Party absorbed most of the former Whig Party that had not gone to either the Republicans or Democrats in 1854, and by 1855 it had established itself as the chief opposition party to the Democrats. In the 82 races for the House of Representatives in 1854, the American Party ran 76 candidates, 35 of whom won. None of the six independents or Whigs who ran in these races were elected.

The party gained control over the state governments of California, Connecticut, Massachusetts, New Hampshire, and Rhode Island in the 1854 and 1855 elections. The party also controlled the Tennessee legislature and received at least 45% of the vote in multiple Southern states, far better than the Whig Party following 1848. The party then succeeded in electing Nathaniel P. Banks as Speaker of the House in the 34th Congress.

However, the party started to break apart at sectional lines over slavery. Henry Wilson led Northern delegates out of the party's 1855 national council in Philadelphia in protest of it adopting a plank endorsing the Kansas-Nebraska Act. 70 Northern delegates left the 1856 convention to create the North American Party after a resolution calling for the Kansas-Nebraska Act to be repealed was defeated.

The American National Convention was held in National Hall in Philadelphia, Pennsylvania, on February 22 to 25, 1856. Following the decision by party leaders in 1855 not to press the slavery issue, the convention had to decide how to deal with the Ohio chapter of the party, which was vocally anti-slavery. The convention closed the Ohio chapter and re-opened it under more moderate leadership. Delegates from New England, Pennsylvania, Ohio, Illinois, Iowa, and other Northern states bolted when a resolution that would have required all prospective nominees to be in favor of prohibiting slavery north of the 36'30' parallel was voted down. This removed a greater part of the American Party's support in the North outside of New York, where the conservative faction of the Whig Party remained faithful.

While Banks was the early favorite for the party's presidential nomination, he publicly declined the nomination and effectively broke from the Know-Nothings, though he would not formally defect to the Republican Party until after the election. After Banks removed himself from consideration, the only name with much support was former President Millard Fillmore. Historian Allan Nevins says that Fillmore was not a Know-Nothing or a nativist. He was out of the country when the presidential nomination came and had not been consulted about running. Furthermore, Fillmore was neither a member of the party nor had he ever attended an American [Know-Nothing] gathering, nor had he by "spoken or written word [...] indicated a subscription to American tenets". Fillmore was nominated with 179 votes out of the 234 votes cast. The convention chose Andrew Jackson Donelson of Tennessee for vice president with 181 votes to 30 scattered votes and 24 abstentions. Although the nativist argument of the American Party had considerable success in local and state elections in 1854–55, Fillmore in 1856 concentrated almost entirely on national unity. Historian Tyler Anbinder says, "The American party had dropped nativism from its agenda." Fillmore won 22% of the national popular vote.

=== North American Party nomination ===
North American Party candidates:

- John C. Frémont, former Senator from California
- Nathaniel P. Banks. Speaker of the House from Massachusetts
- John McLean, Associate Justice
- Robert F. Stockton, former Senator from New Jersey
- William F. Johnston, Governor of Pennsylvania
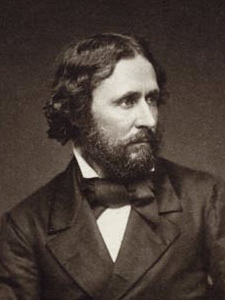
Former Senator John C. Frémont from California

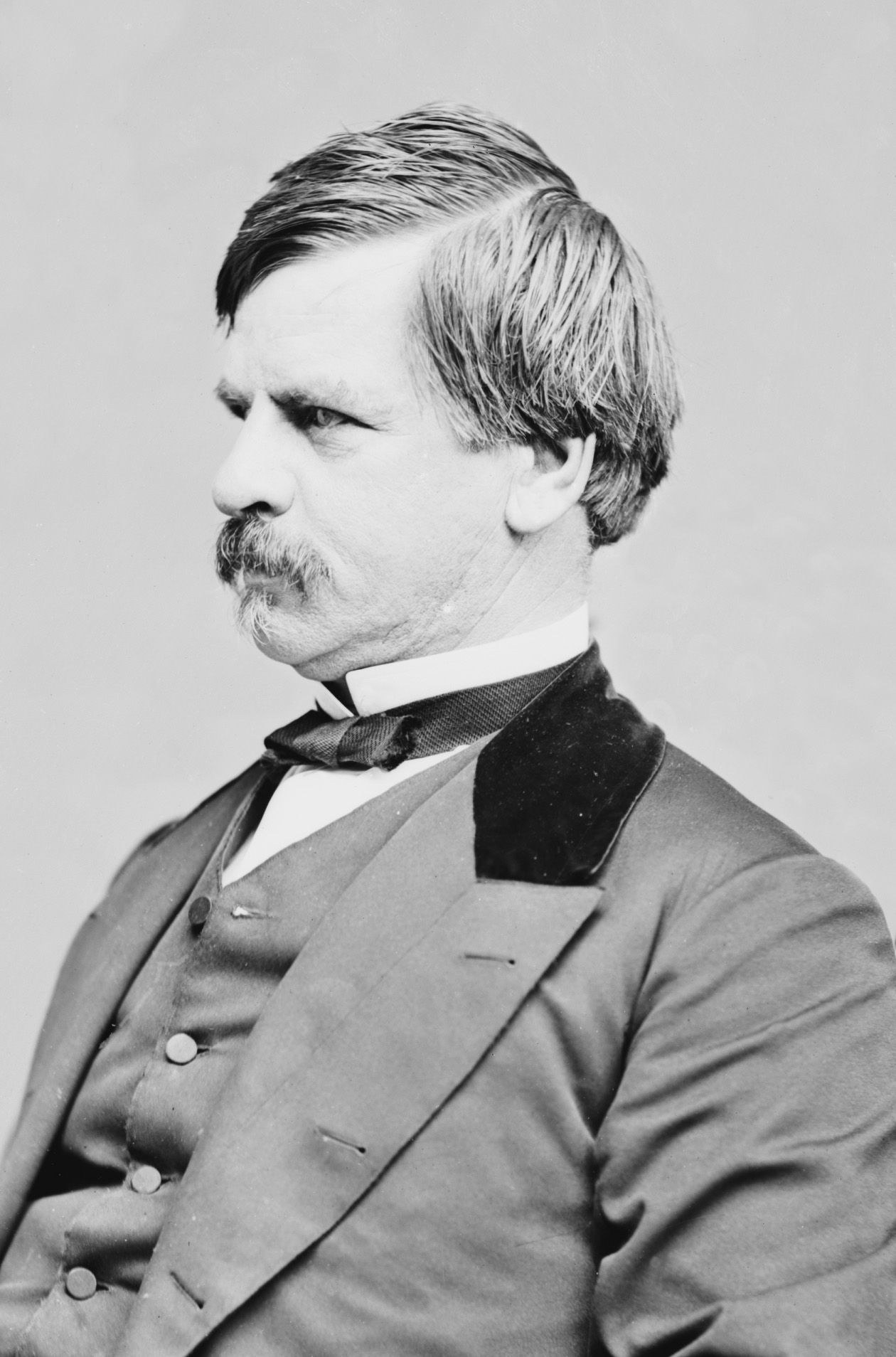
Speaker Nathaniel P. Banks
(Declined Nomination)

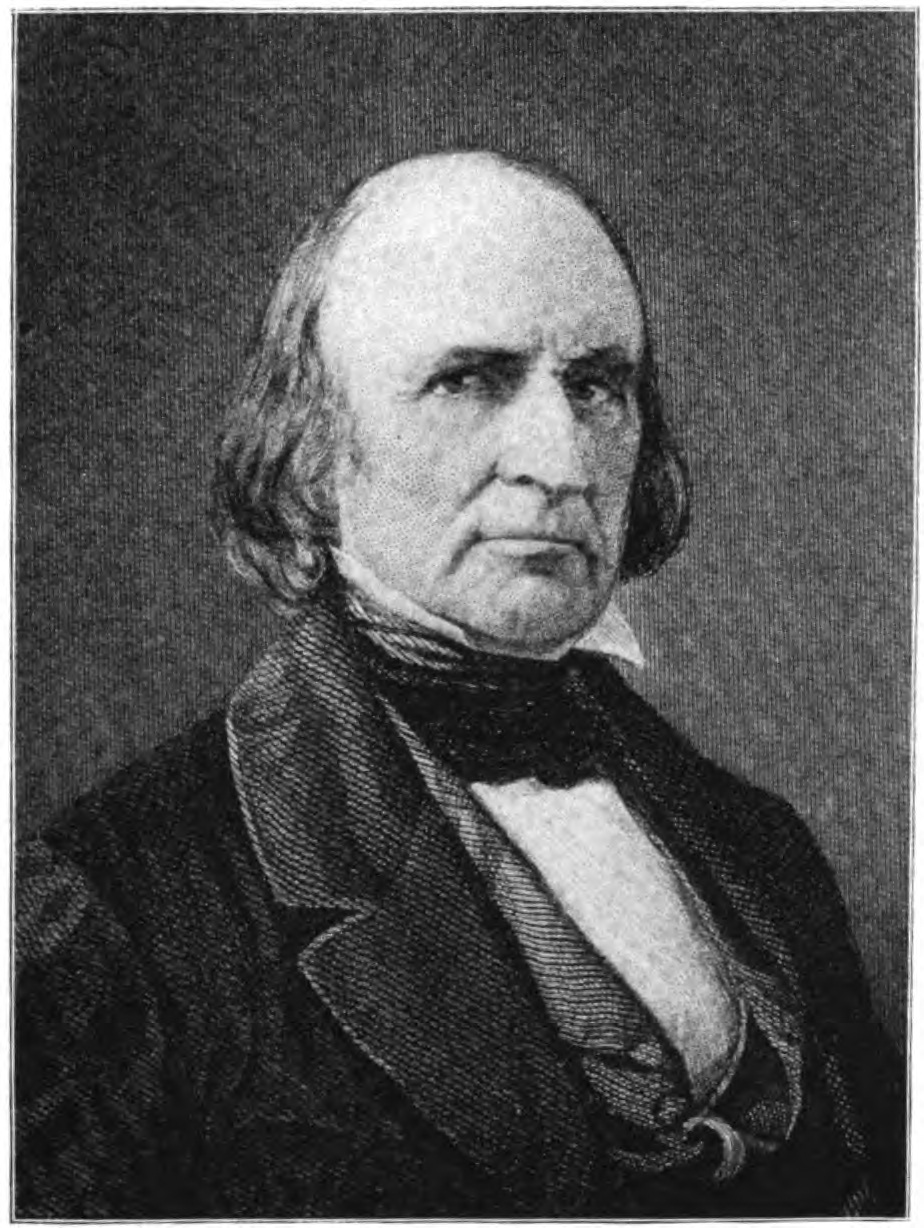
Supreme Court Associate Justice John McLean

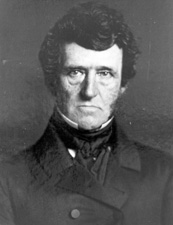
Former Senator Robert F. Stockton

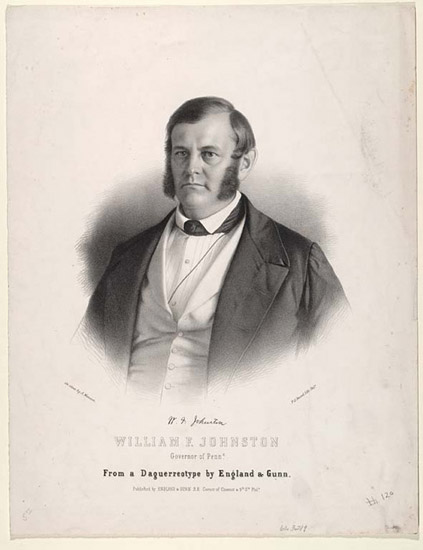
Governor William F. Johnston of Pennsylvania

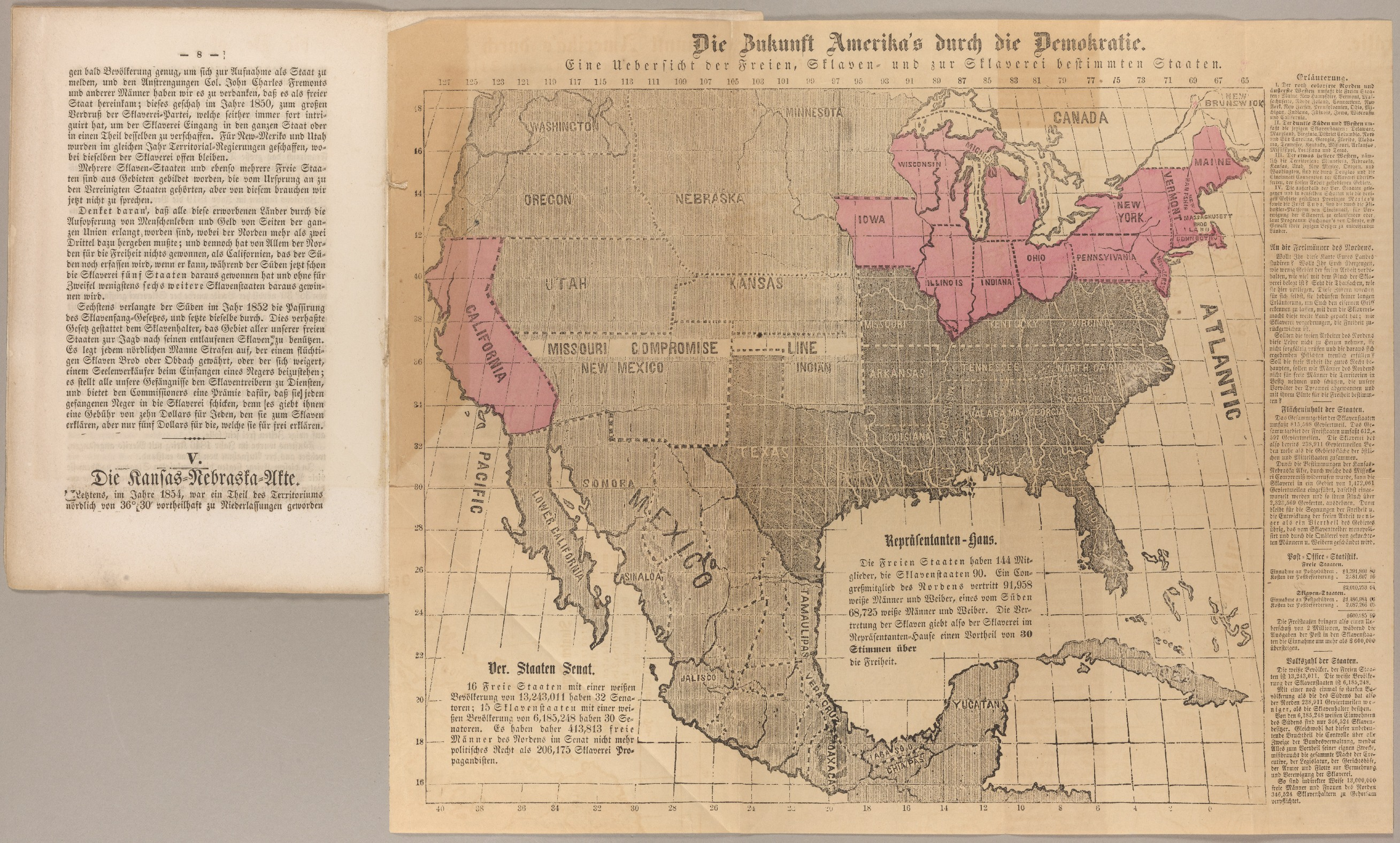
An anti-slavery map printed during the presidential election campaign of 1856 by the John C. Fremont campaign.

The anti-slavery "Americans" from the North formed their own party after the nomination of Fillmore in Philadelphia. This party called for its national convention to be held in New York City, just before the Republican National Convention. Party leaders hoped to nominate a joint ticket with the Republicans to defeat Buchanan. The national convention was held on June 12 to 20, 1856 in New York. As John C. Frémont was the favorite to attain the Republican presidential nomination there was a considerable desire for the North American party to nominate him, but it was feared that in doing so they may possibly injure his chances to actually become the Republican presidential nominee. The delegates voted repeatedly on a nominee for president without a result. Nathaniel P. Banks was nominated for president on the 10th ballot over John C. Frémont and John McLean, with the understanding that he would withdraw from the race and endorse John C. Frémont once he had won the Republican presidential nomination. The delegates, preparing to return home, unanimously nominated Frémont on the 11th ballot shortly after his nomination by the Republican Party in Philadelphia. The chairman of the convention, William F. Johnston, had been nominated to run for vice president, but later withdrew when the North Americans and the Republicans failed to find an acceptable accommodation between him and the Republican vice presidential nominee, William Dayton.

Convention vote
Presidential ballots	1	2	3	4	5	6	7	8	9	10	11	Vice presidential ballot	
Nathaniel P. Banks	43	48	46	47	46	45	51	50	50	53	0	William F. Johnston	59
John C. Frémont	34	36	37	37	31	29	29	27	28	18	92	Thomas Ford	16
John McLean	19	10	2	29	33	40	41	40	30	24	0	John C. Frémont	12
Robert F. Stockton	14	20	18	0	0	0	0	0	0	0	0	Scattering	21
William F. Johnston	6	1	15	0	0	0	0	0	0	0	0		
Scattering	5	0	0	0	1	2	0	0	0	0	0		

=== North American Seceders Party nomination ===
North American Seceders Party candidates:

- John C. Frémont, former senator from California
- Nathaniel P. Banks. Speaker of the House from Massachusetts
- John McLean, Associate Justice from Ohio
- Robert F. Stockton, former Senator from New Jersey
- William F. Johnston, Governor of Pennsylvania
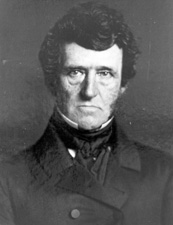
Former Senator Robert F. Stockton from New Jersey
(Withdrew – Endorsed Fillmore)

A group of North American delegates called the North American Seceders withdrew from the North American Party's convention and met separately. They objected to the attempt to work with the Republican Party. The Seceders held their own national convention on June 16 and 17, 1856. 19 delegates unanimously nominated Robert F. Stockton for president and Kenneth Rayner for vice president. The Seceders' ticket later withdrew from the contest, with Stockton endorsing Millard Fillmore for the presidency.

=== Whig Party nomination ===
The Whig Party was reeling from electoral losses since 1852. Half of its leaders in the South bolted to the Southern Democratic Party. In the North the Whig Party was moribund with most of its anti-slavery members joining the Republican Party. This party remained somewhat alive in states like New York and Pennsylvania by joining the anti-slavery movement.

The fifth (and last) Whig National Convention was held in the Hall of the Maryland Institute in Baltimore, Maryland, on September 17 and 18, 1856. There were 150 delegates sent from 26 states. Though the leaders of this party wanted to keep the Whig Party alive, it became irretrievably doomed once these 150 Whig delegates decided unanimously to endorse the American Party's national ticket of Fillmore and Donelson.

=== Radical Abolitionist Party nomination ===
By 1856, very little of the Liberty Party remained. Most of its members joined the Free Soil Party in 1848 and nearly of all what remained of the party joined the Republicans in 1854. What remained of the party ran 1848 candidate Gerrit Smith under the name of the "Radical Abolitionist Party."

== General election ==
=== Campaign ===
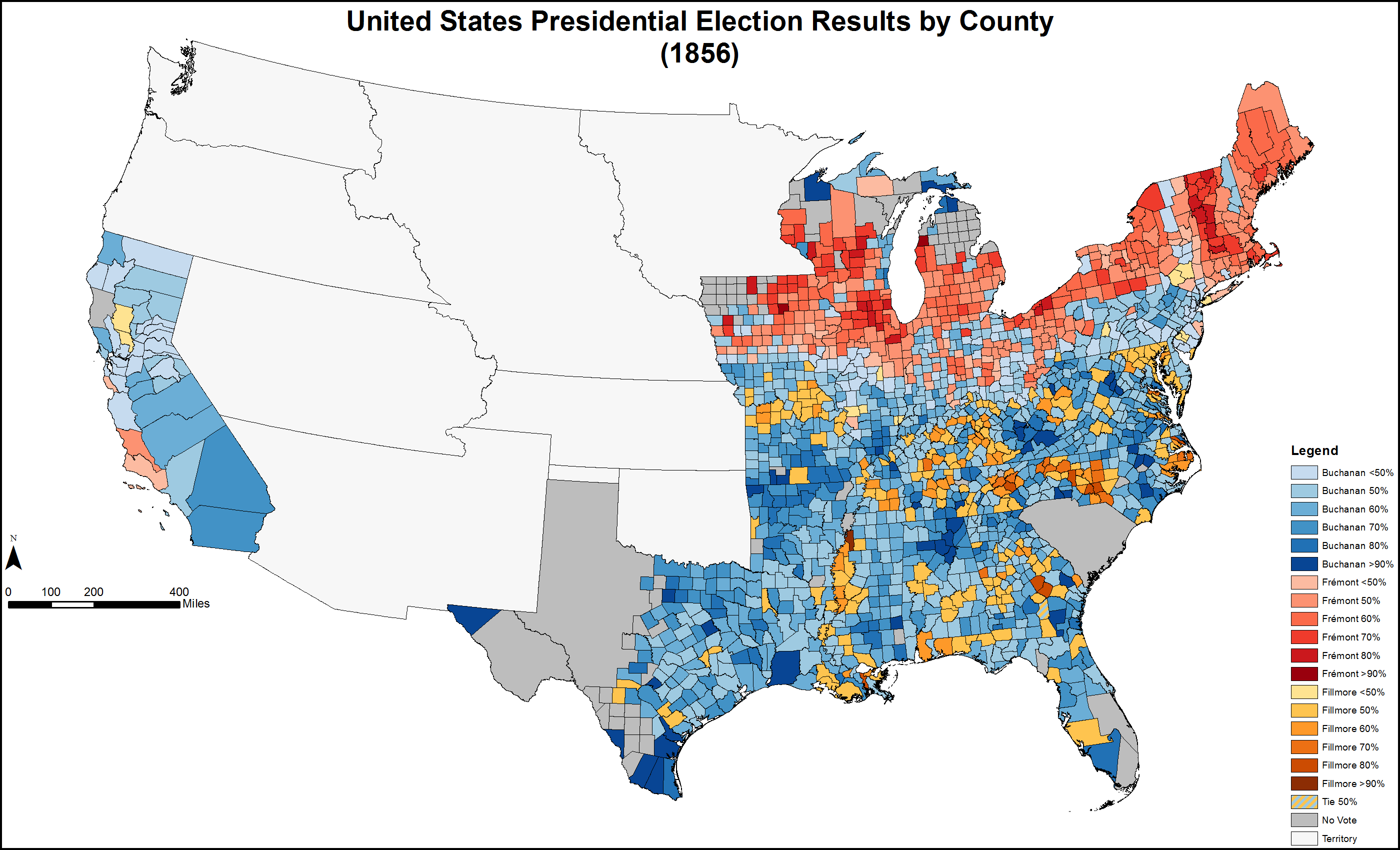
Results by county explicitly indicating the percentage for the winning candidate. Shades of blue are for Buchanan (Democratic), shades of red are for Frémont (Republican), and shades of yellow are for Fillmore (Know Nothing/Whig).

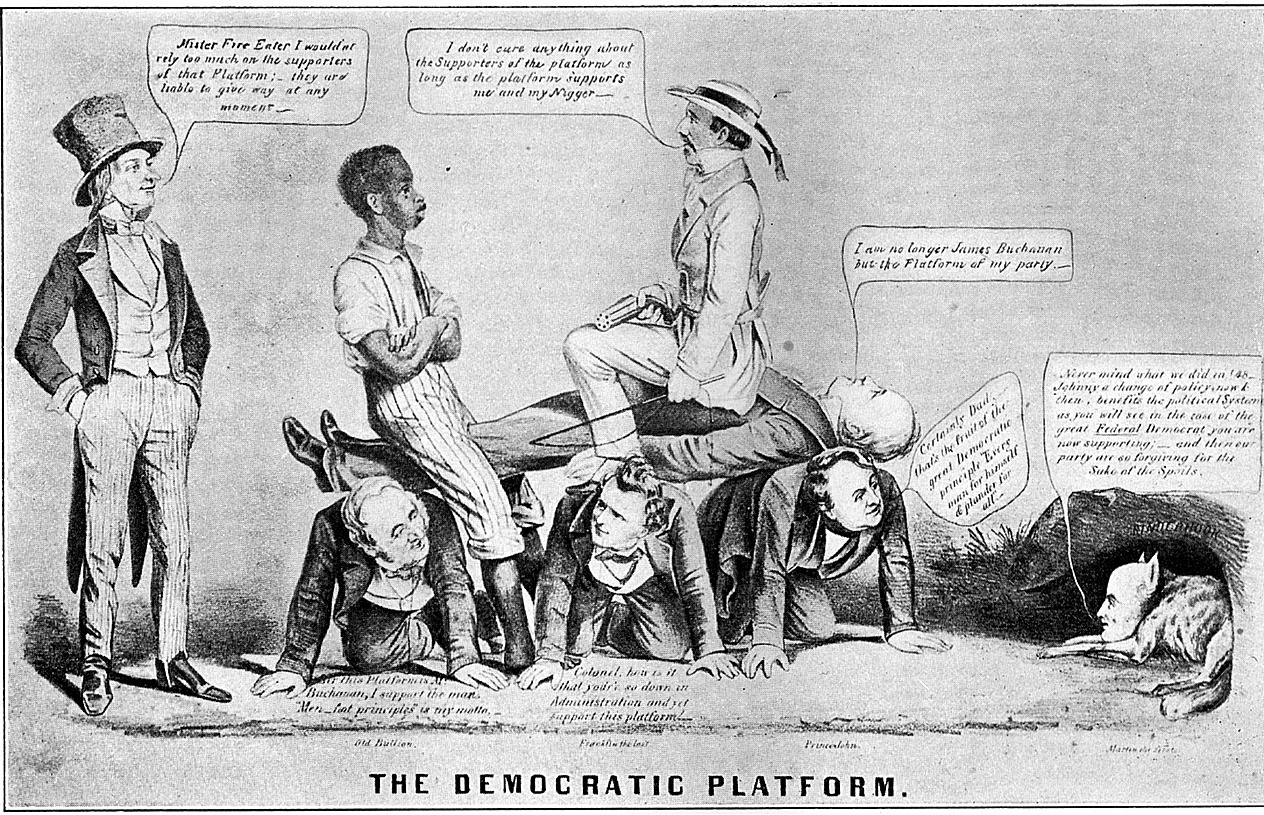
Caricature of Democratic Platform

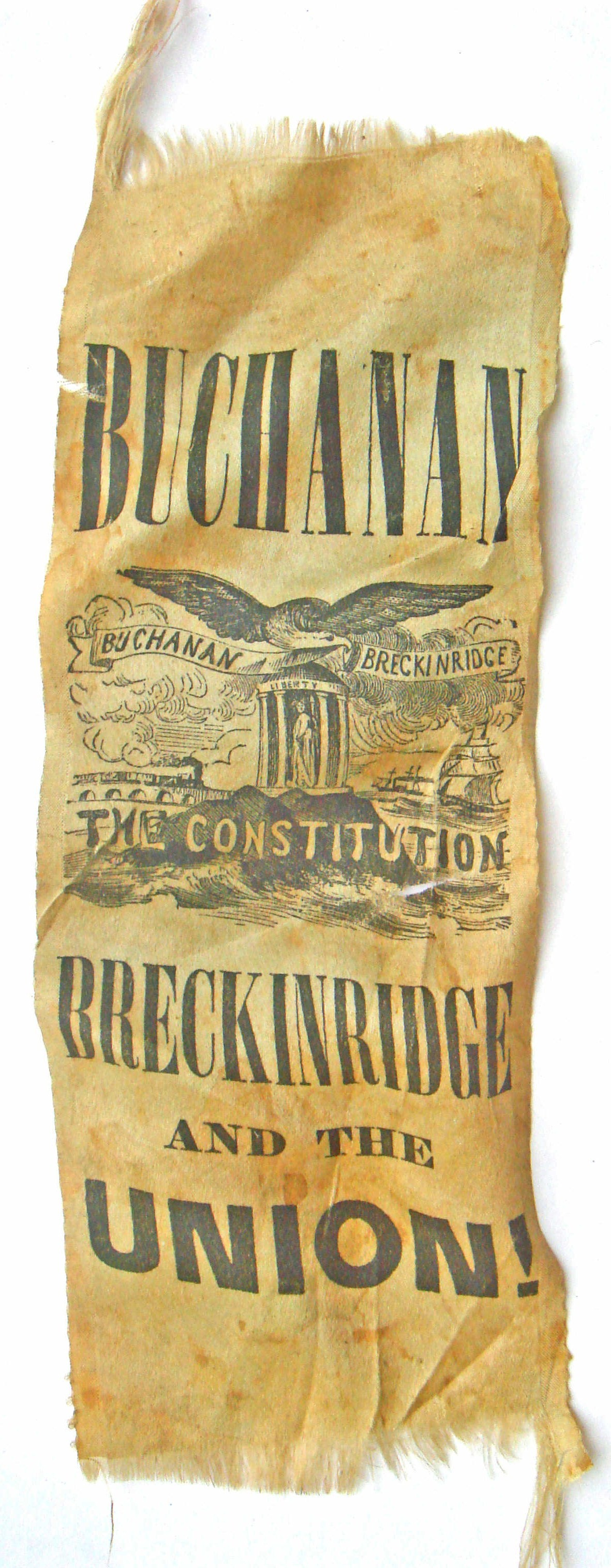
Campaign ribbon

None of the three candidates did any public campaigning. The Republican Party opposed the extension of slavery into the territories: in fact, its slogan was "Free speech, free press, free soil, free men, Frémont and victory!" The Republicans thus crusaded against the Slave Power, warning it was destroying republican values. Democrats warned that a Republican victory would bring a civil war.

The Republican platform opposed the repeal of the Missouri Compromise through the Kansas–Nebraska Act, which enacted the policy of popular sovereignty, allowing settlers to decide whether a new state would enter the Union as free or slave. The Republicans also accused the Pierce administration of allowing a fraudulent territorial government to be imposed upon the citizens of the Kansas Territory, thus engendering the violence that had raged in Bleeding Kansas. They advocated the immediate admittance of Kansas as a free state.

Along with opposing the spread of slavery into the continental territories of the United States, the party also opposed the Ostend Manifesto, which advocated the annexation of Cuba from Spain. In sum, the campaign's true focus was against the system of slavery, which they felt was destroying the republican values that the Union had been founded upon.

The Democratic platform supported the Kansas-Nebraska Act and popular sovereignty. The party supported the pro-slavery territorial legislature elected in Kansas, opposed the free-state elements within Kansas, and castigated the Topeka Constitution as an illegal document written during an illegal convention. The Democrats also supported the plan to annex Cuba, advocated in the Ostend Manifesto, which Buchanan helped devise while serving as minister to Britain. The most influential aspect of the Democratic campaign was a warning that a Republican victory would lead to the secession of numerous southern states. The main Democratic campaign was a counter-crusade against the Republicans. They ridiculed Frémont's military record and warned that his victory would bring civil war. Much of the private rhetoric of the campaign focused on unfounded rumors regarding Frémont—talk of him as president taking charge of a large army that would support slave insurrections, the likelihood of widespread lynchings of slaves, and whispered hope among slaves for freedom and political equality.

Because Fillmore was considered by many incapable of securing the presidency on the American ticket, Whigs were urged to support Buchanan. Democrats also called on nativists to make common cause with them against the specter of sectionalism even if they had once attacked their political views.

Fillmore and the Americans, meanwhile, insisted that they were the only "national party" since the Democrats leaning in favor of the South and the Republicans were fanatically in favor of Northern fanaticism.

A minor scandal erupted when the Americans, seeking to turn the national dialogue back in the direction of nativism, put out a false rumor that Frémont was in fact a Roman Catholic. Because of the Republican candidate's French-Canadian ancestry and surname, many voters accepted the allegation at face value. The Democrats ran with it, and the Republicans found themselves unable to counteract the rumor effectively given that while the statements were false, any stern message against those assertions might have crippled their efforts to attain the votes of German Catholics. Attempts were made to refute it through friends and colleagues, but the issue persisted throughout the campaign and might have cost Frémont the support of a number of American Party members.

== Results ==
30.6% of the voting age population and 79.4% of eligible voters participated in the election.

The campaign had a different nature in the free states and the slave states. In the free states, there was a three-way campaign, which Frémont won with 45.2% of the vote to 41.5% for Buchanan and 13.3% for Fillmore; Frémont received 114 electoral votes to 62 for Buchanan. In the slave states, however, the contest was for all intents and purposes between Buchanan and Fillmore; Buchanan won 56.1% of the vote to 43.8% for Fillmore and 0.1% for Frémont, receiving 112 electoral votes to 8 for Fillmore.

Nationwide, Buchanan won 174 electoral votes, a majority, and was thus elected. Frémont received no votes in ten of the fourteen slave states with a popular vote; he obtained 306 in Delaware, 285 in Maryland, 283 in Virginia, and 314 in Kentucky. Of the 1,713 counties making returns, Buchanan won 1,083 (63.22%), Frémont won 366 (21.37%), and Fillmore won 263 (15.35%). One county (0.06%), in Georgia, was split evenly between Buchanan and Fillmore.

This would be the only presidential election where the Know-Nothing Party put up a campaign, as the party began to splinter. After the Supreme Court's controversial Dred Scott v. Sandford ruling in 1857, most of the anti-slavery members of the party joined the Republicans. The pro-slavery wing of the American Party remained strong on the local and state levels in a few Southern states, but, by the 1860 election, they no longer were a serious national political movement. Most of their remaining members either joined or supported the Constitutional Union Party in 1860.

This was the last election in which a candidate won without any electoral votes from New England until 2004, and only the second such occurrence after Democrat Andrew Jackson in 1828, and the only time that a Republican swept the region without winning the presidency. It is also the most recent election in which a Democrat was elected to succeed a Democratic president, and is only the second instance of such an occurrence, the first being in 1836.

This was the last election in which the Democrats won Pennsylvania until 1936, the last in which the Democrats won Illinois until 1892, the last in which the Democrats won California until 1880, the last in which the Democrats won Indiana and Virginia until 1876 and the last in which the Democrats won Tennessee until 1872. This also started the long Republican trend in Vermont, which would not be broken until 1964, over a century later. The presidential election of 1856 was also the last one in which a former president ran for election to the presidency on a third-party ticket until 1912, when Theodore Roosevelt ran on the Progressive Party ticket. Gasconade County, Missouri, as of the 2024 United States presidential election, has not voted Democratic since, marking the beginning of the longest active voting streak for any party at the county level.

Electoral results
Presidential candidate	Party	Home state	Popular vote^{(a)}		Electoral vote	Running mate		
Presidential candidate	Party	Home state	Count	Percentage	Electoral vote	Vice-presidential candidate	Home state	Electoral vote
James Buchanan	Democratic	Pennsylvania	1,836,072	45.28%	174	John C. Breckinridge	Kentucky	174
John C. Frémont	Republican	California	1,342,345	33.11%	114	William L. Dayton	New Jersey	114
Millard Fillmore	American	New York	873,053	21.53%	8	Andrew Jackson Donelson	Tennessee	8
Other			3,177	0.08%	—	Other		—
Total			4,054,647	100%	296			296
Needed to win					149			149

Source (Popular Vote): Leip, David. "1856 Presidential Election Results". Dave Leip's Atlas of U.S. Presidential Elections. Source (Electoral Vote): "Electoral College Box Scores 1789–1996". National Archives and Records Administration.

^{(a)} The popular vote figures exclude South Carolina where the Electors were chosen by the state legislature rather than by popular vote.

Popular vote
Buchanan	45.28%
Frémont	33.11%
Fillmore	21.53%
Others	0.03%

Electoral vote
Buchanan	58.78%
Frémont	38.51%
Fillmore	2.70%

=== Geography of results ===
Results by county, shaded according to winning candidate's percentage of the vote

==== Cartographic gallery ====
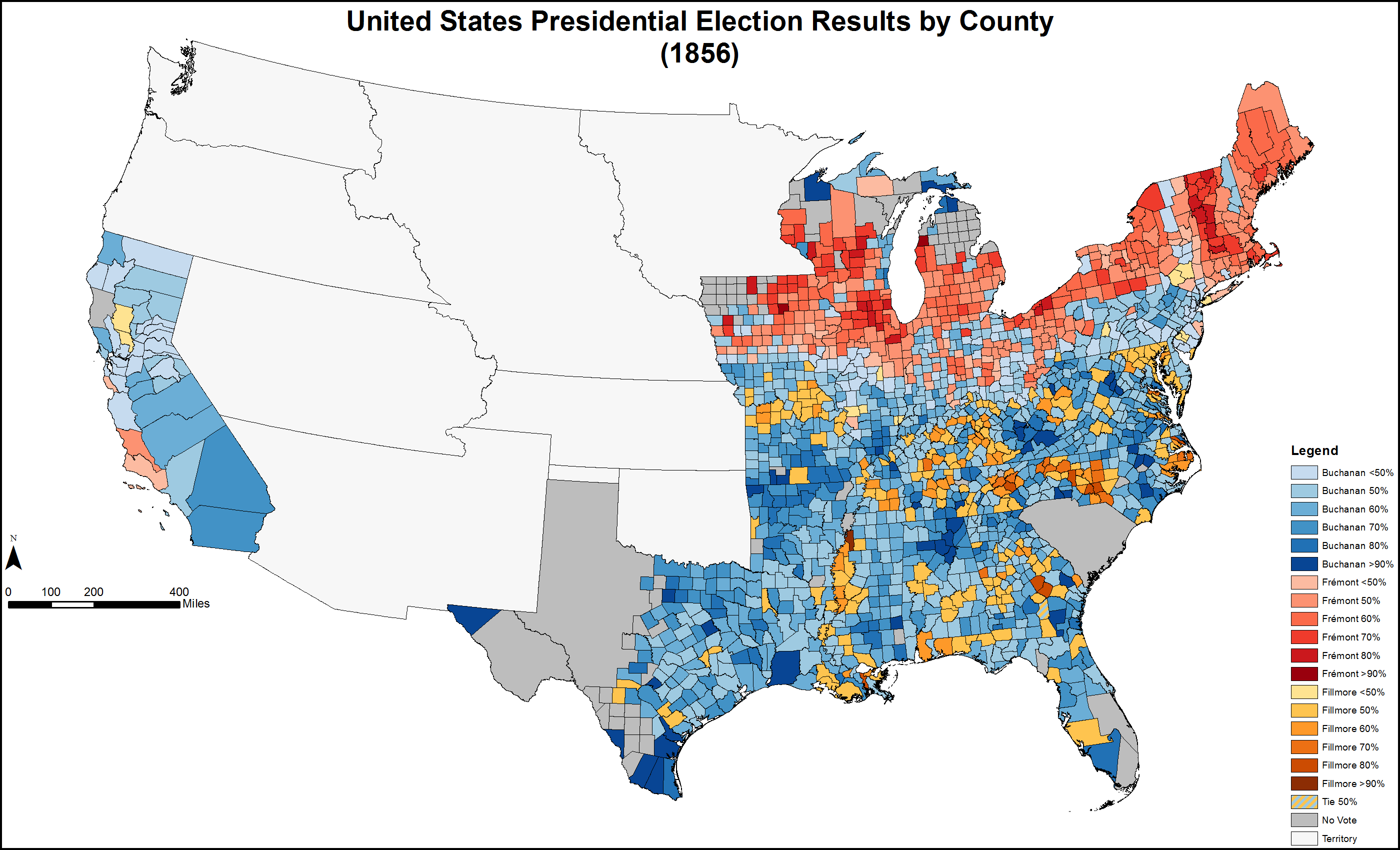
Map of presidential election results by county

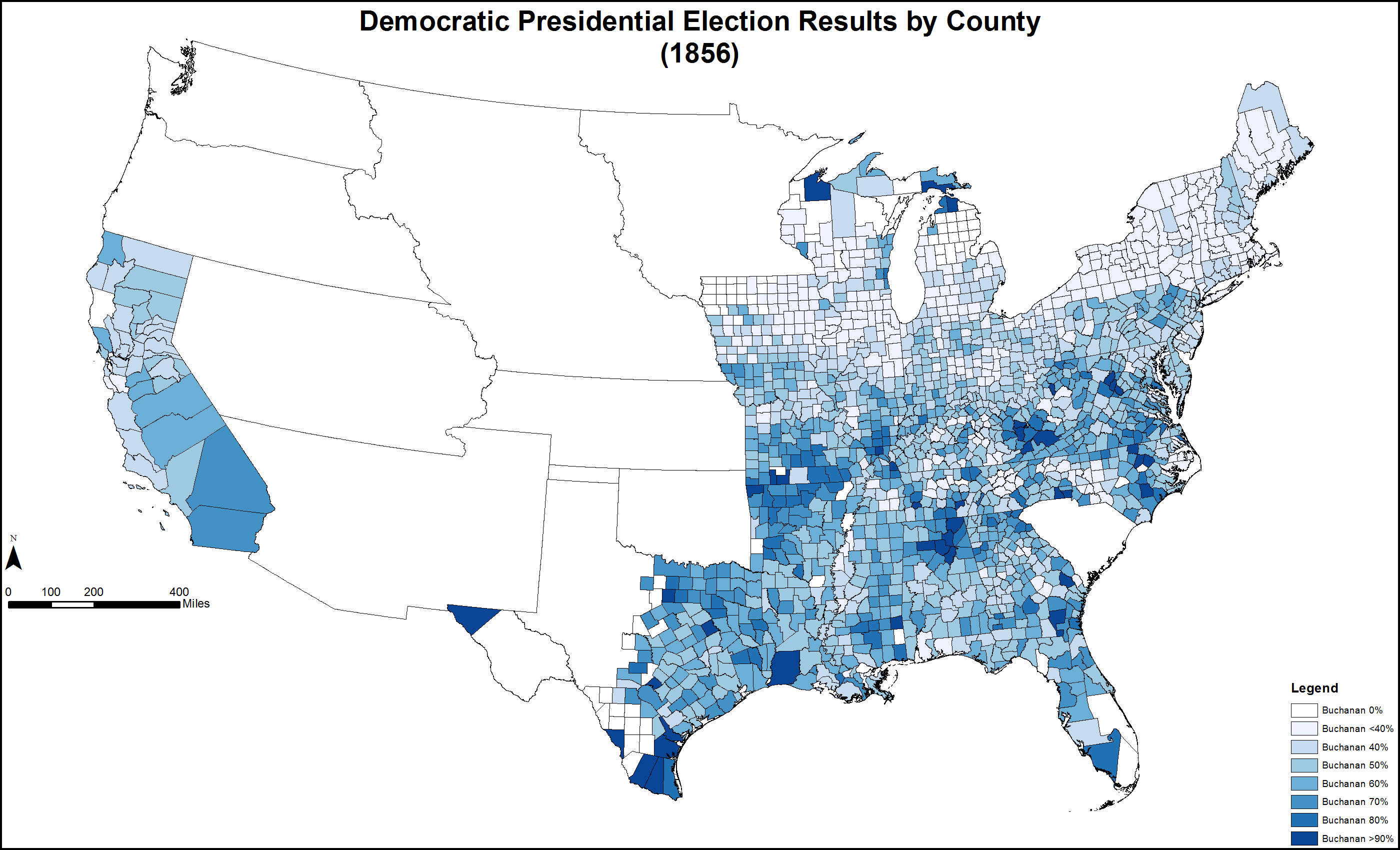
Map of Democratic presidential election results by county

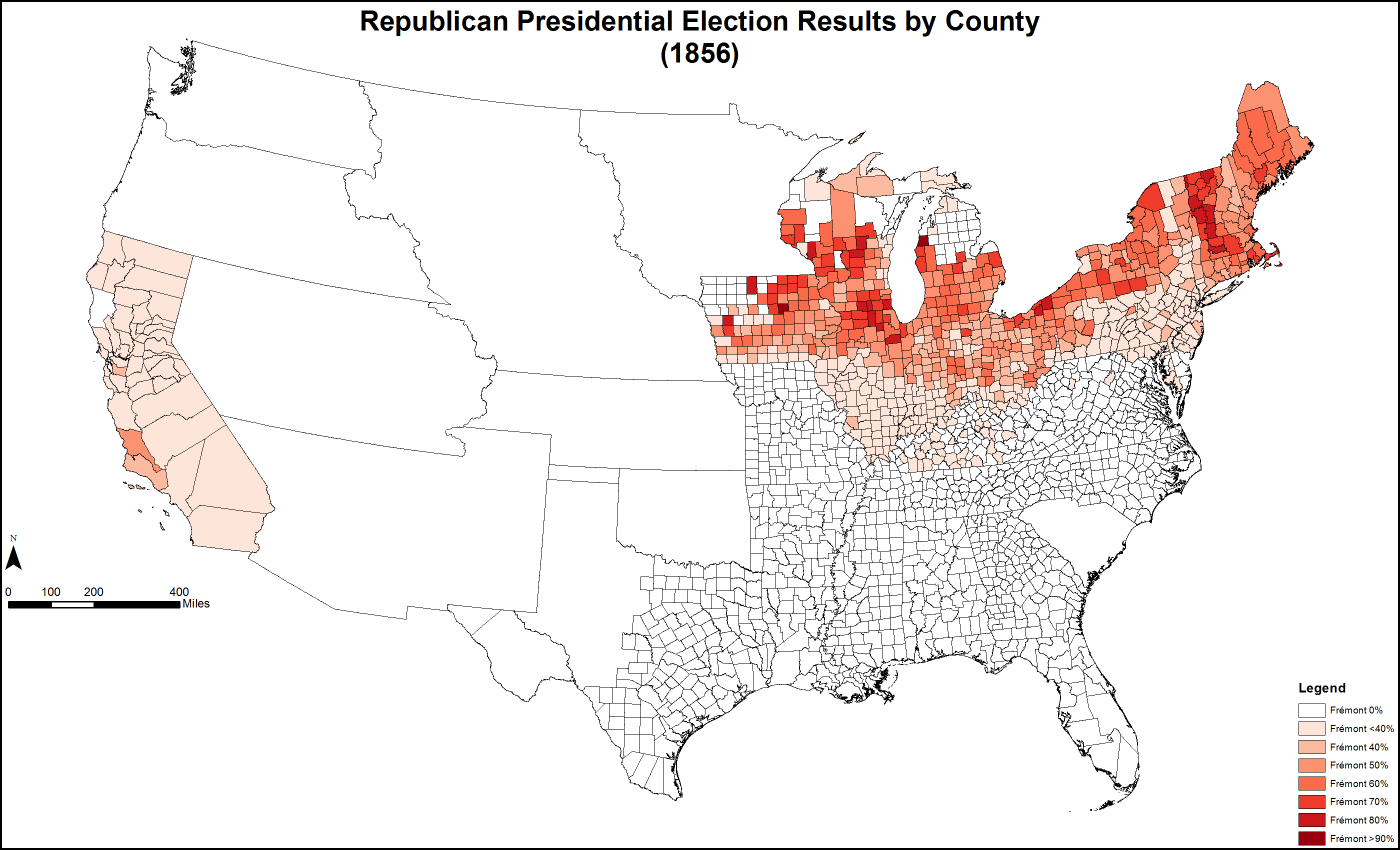
Map of Republican presidential election results by county

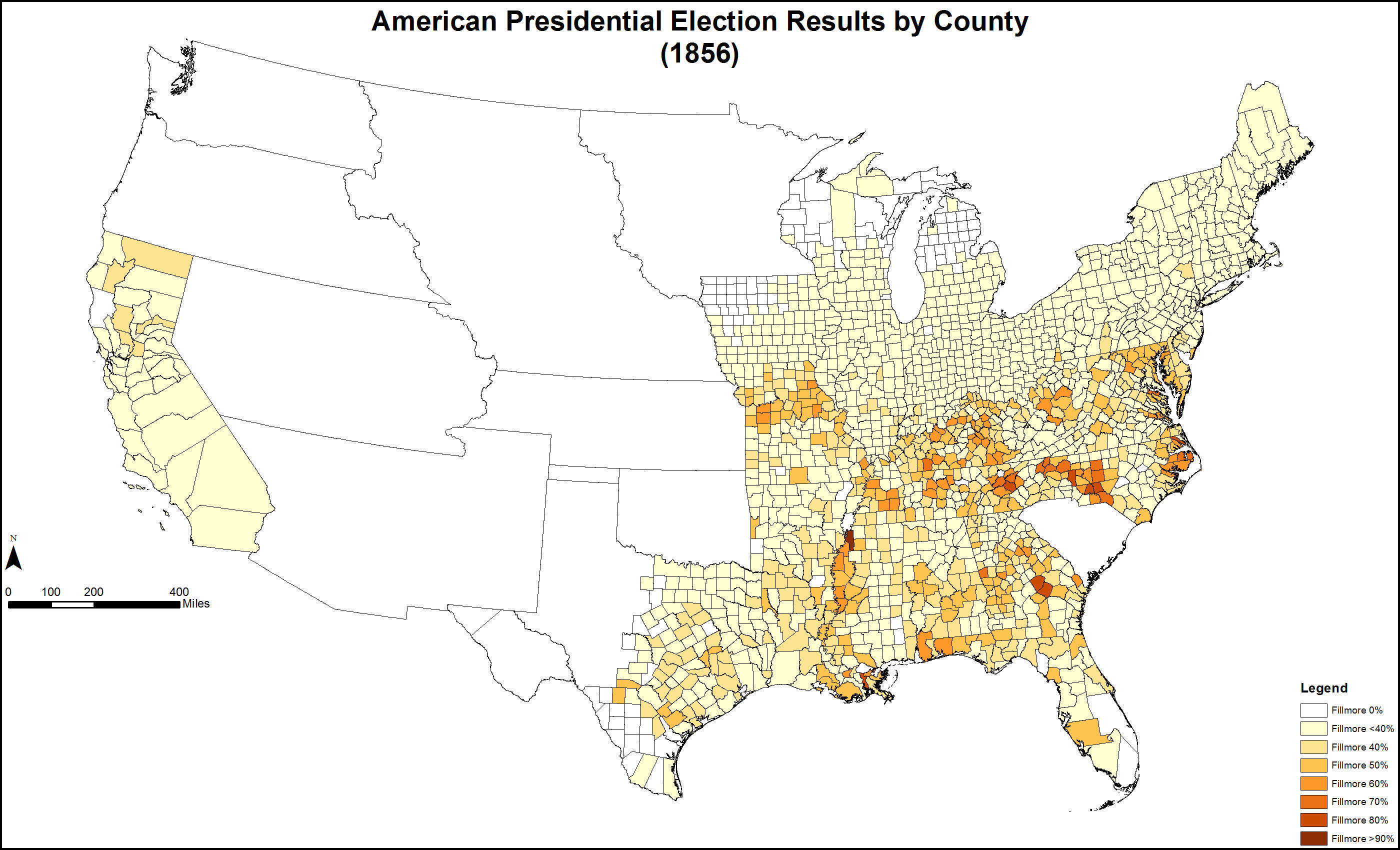
Map of American "Know-Nothing"/Whig presidential election results by county

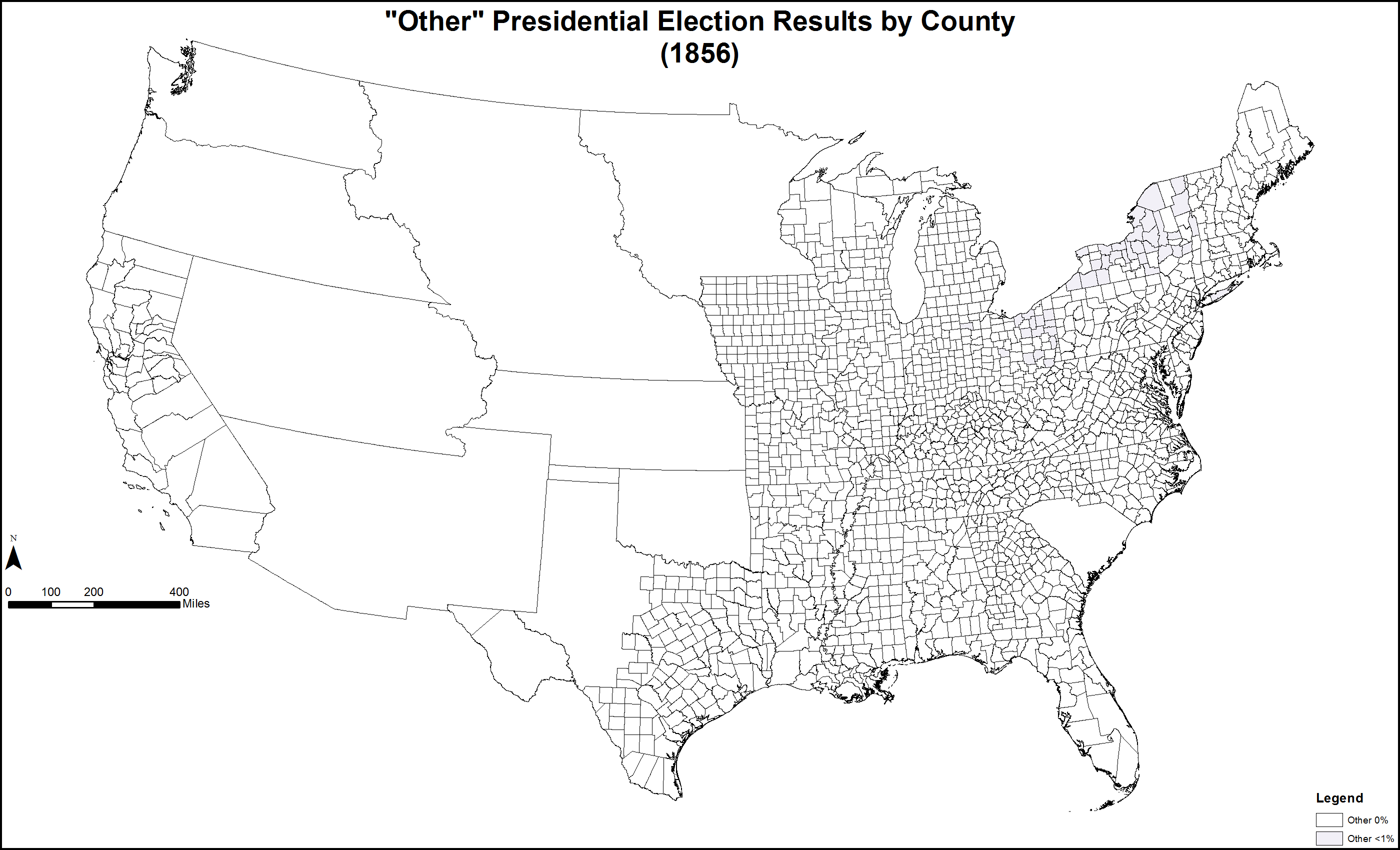
Map of "Other" presidential election results by county

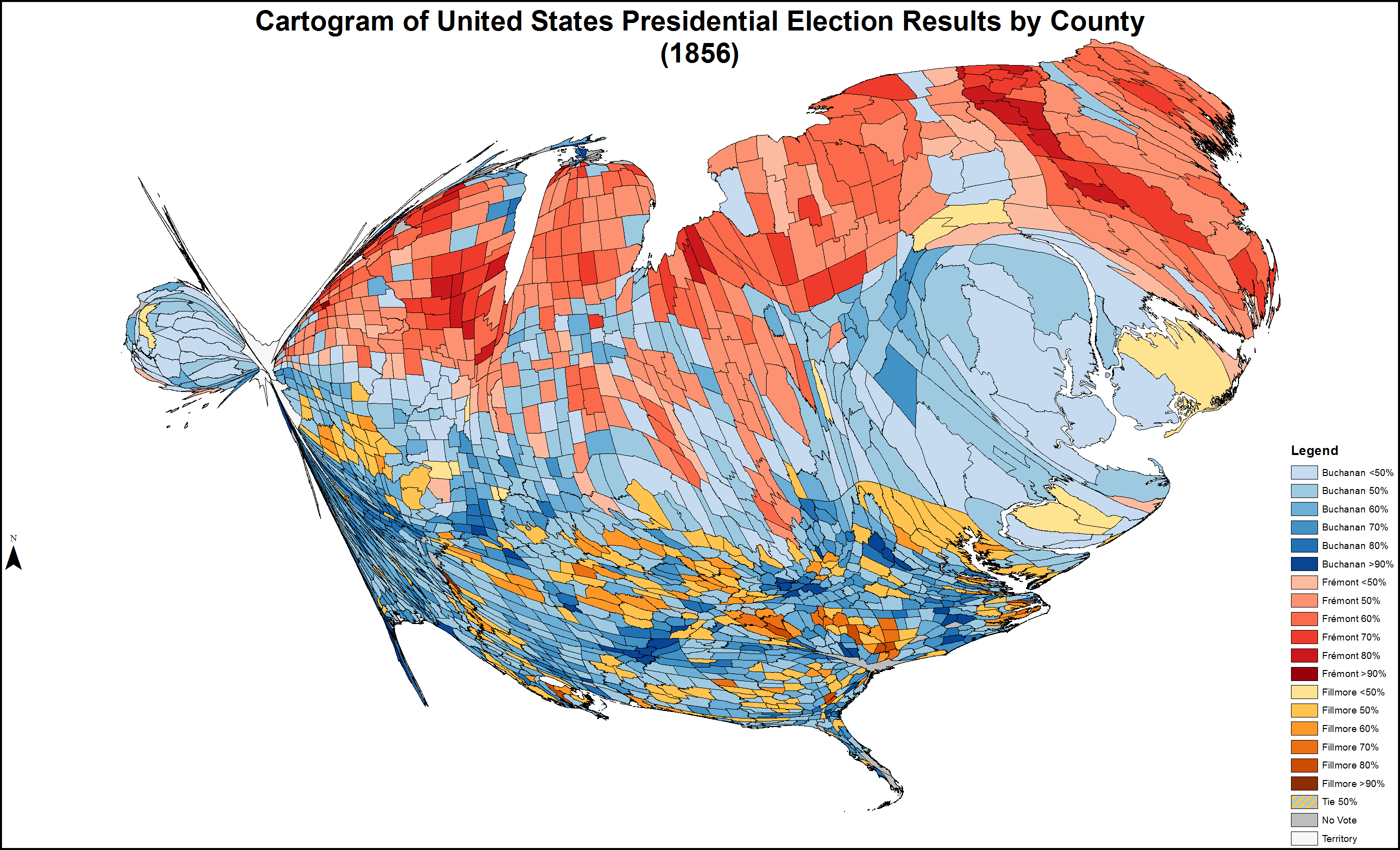
Cartogram of presidential election results by county

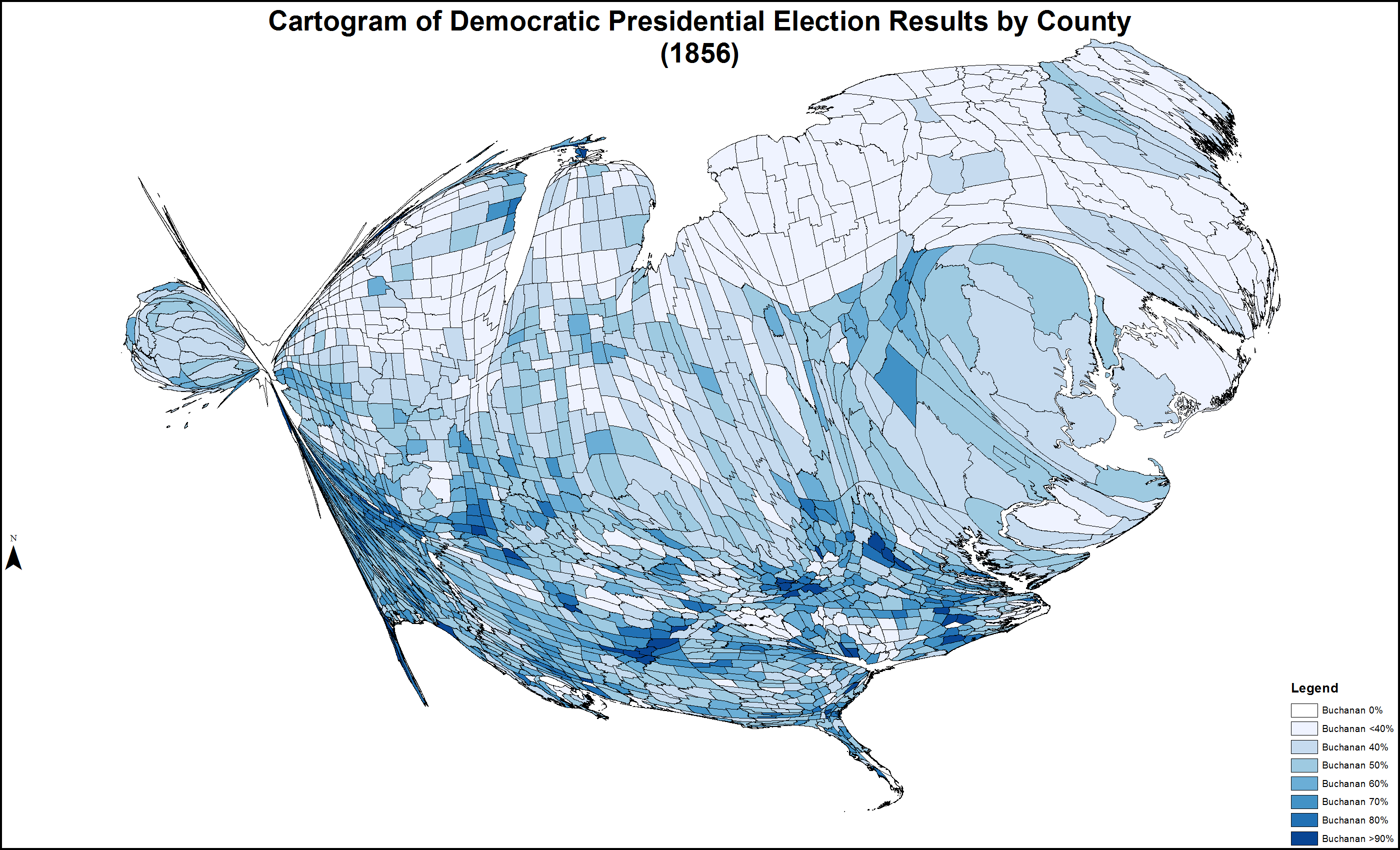
Cartogram of Democratic presidential election results by county

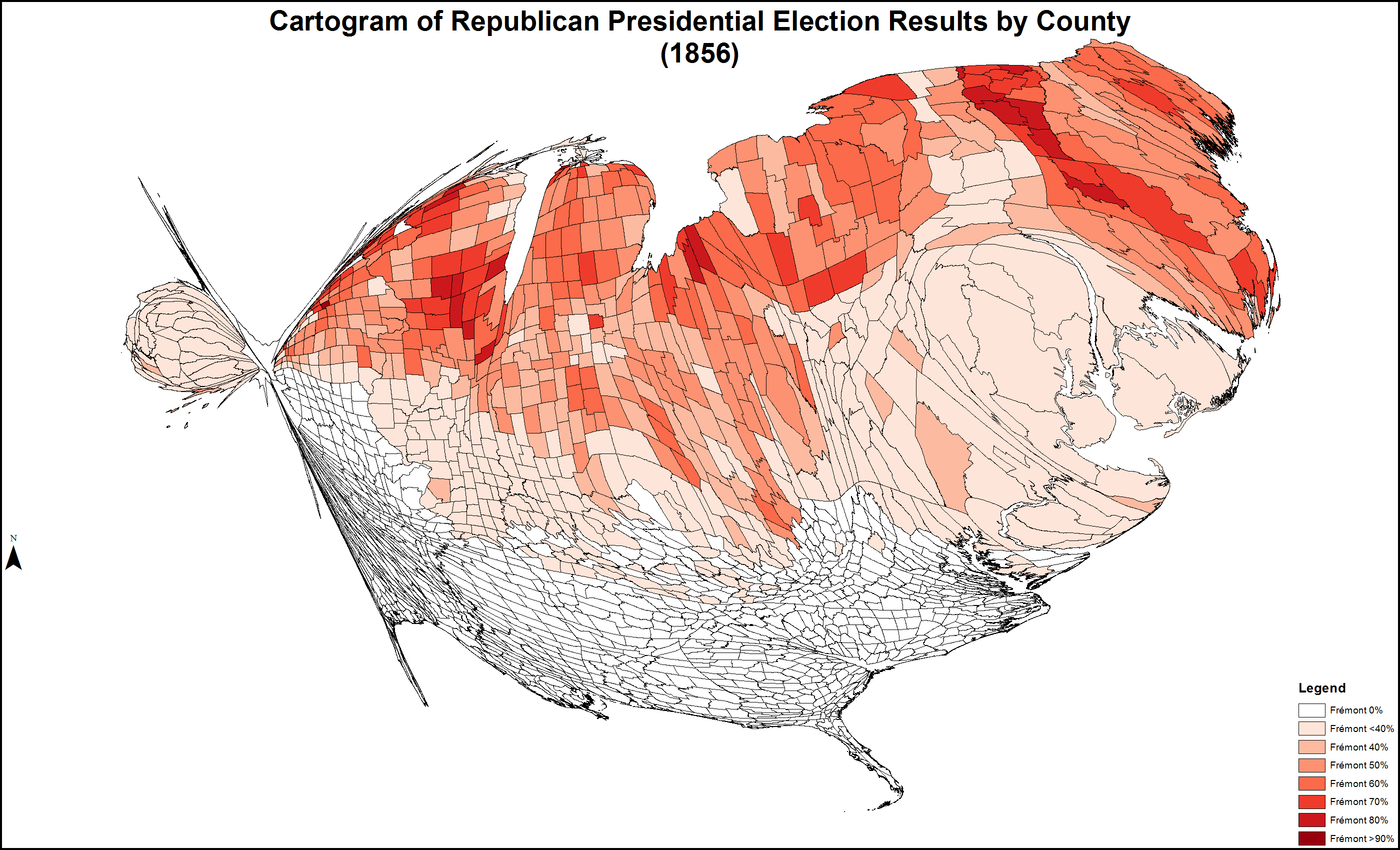
Cartogram of Republican presidential election results by county

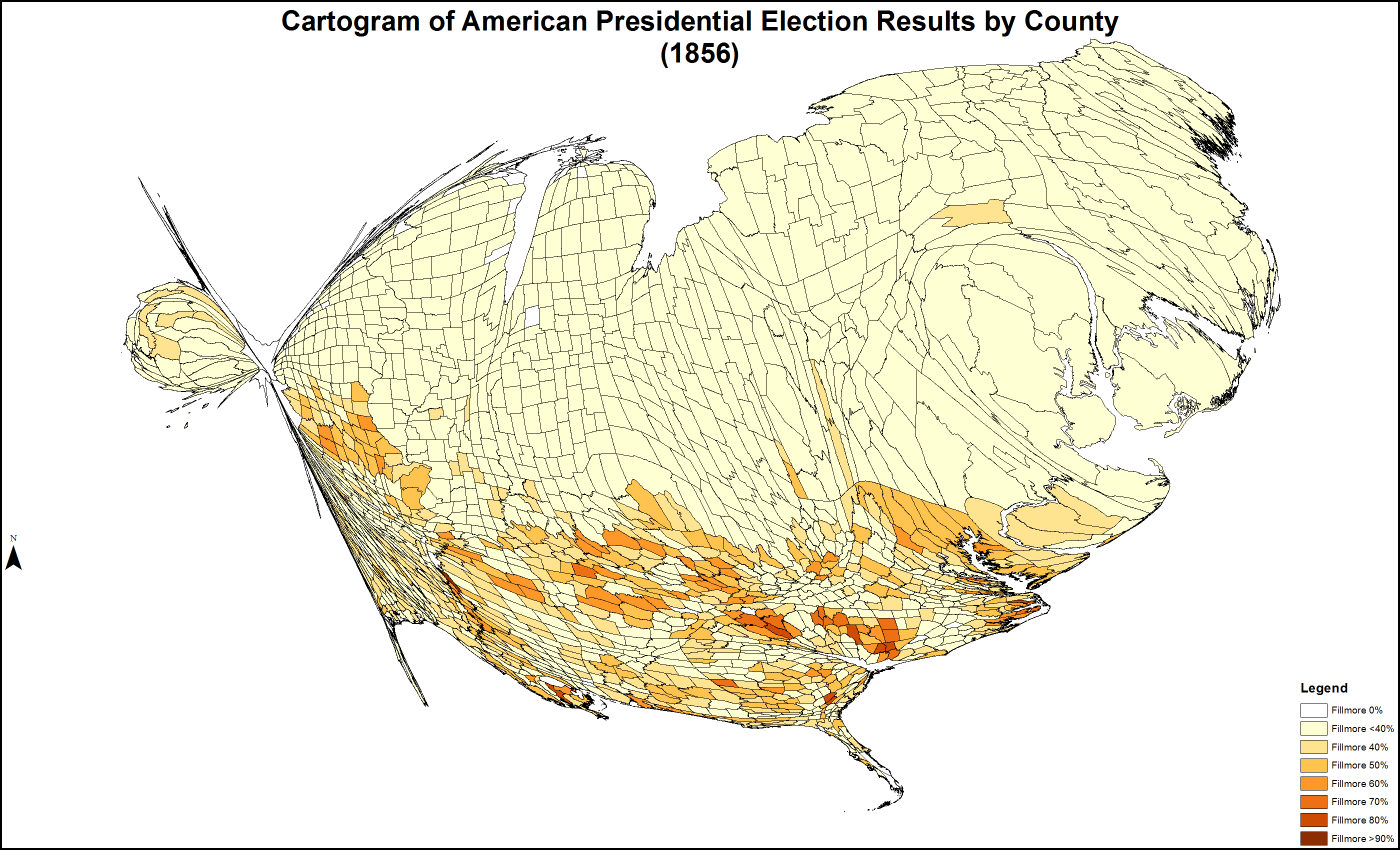
Cartogram of American/Whig presidential election results by county

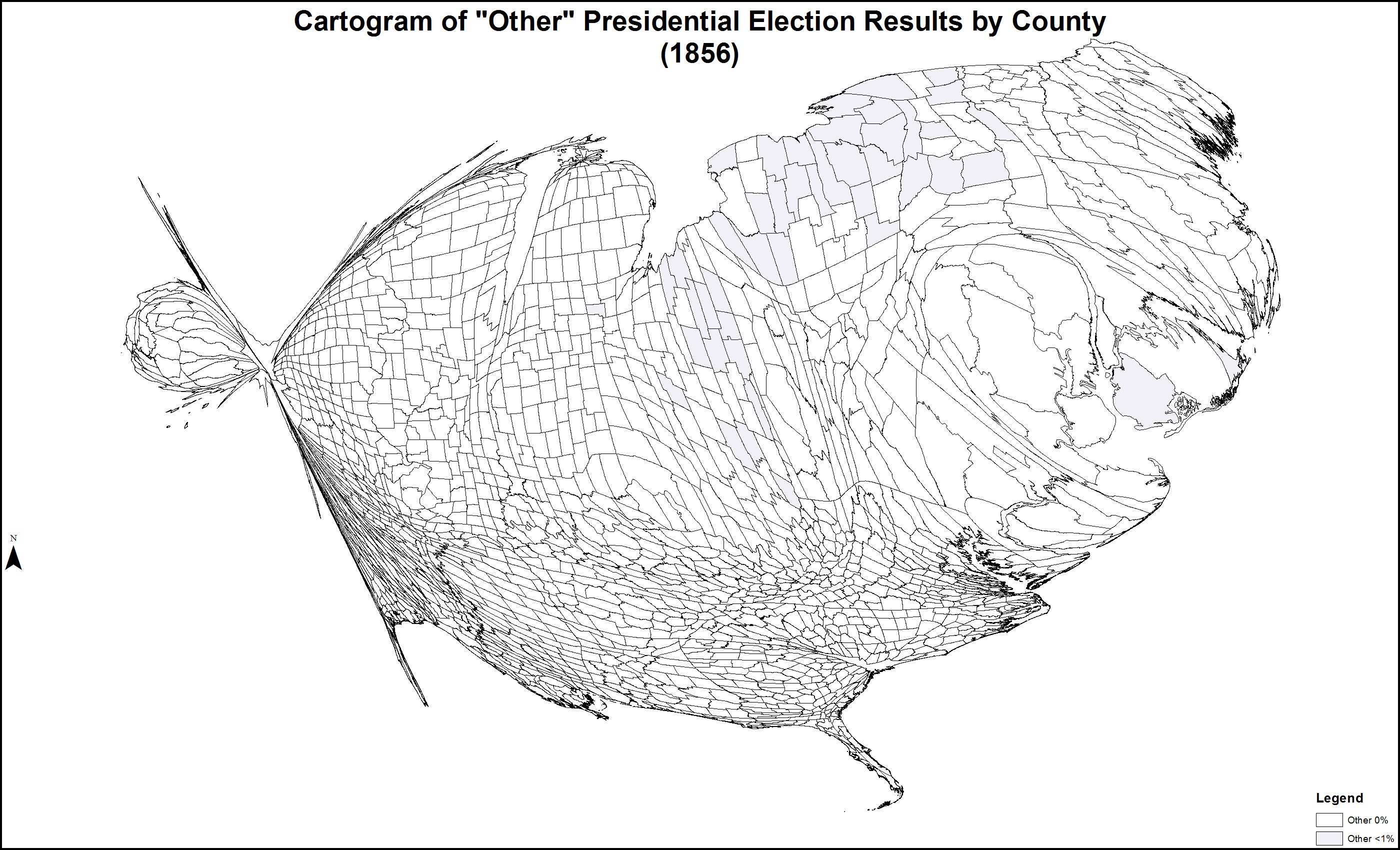
Cartogram of "Other" presidential election results by county

=== Results by state ===
Source: Data from Walter Dean Burnham, Presidential ballots, 1836–1892 (Johns Hopkins University Press, 1955) pp 247–57.

States/districts won by Buchanan/Breckinridge
States/districts won by Frémont/Dayton
States/districts won by Fillmore/Donelson

		James Buchanan Democratic			John C. Fremont Republican			Millard Fillmore American			Margin		State Total	
State	electoral votes	#	%	electoral votes	#	%	electoral votes	#	%	electoral votes	#	%	#	
Alabama	9	46,739	62.08	9	no ballots			28,552	37.92	–	18,187	24.16	75,291	AL
Arkansas	4	21,910	67.12	4	no ballots			10,732	32.88	–	11,178	34.24	32,642	AR
California	4	53,342	48.38	4	20,704	18.78	–	36,195	32.83	–	17,147	15.55	110,255	CA
Connecticut	6	34,997	43.57	–	42,717	53.18	6	2,615	3.26	–	−7,720	−9.61	80,329	CT
Delaware	3	8,004	54.83	3	310	2.12	–	6,275	42.99	–	1,729	11.84	14,589	DE
Florida	3	6,358	56.81	3	no ballots			4,833	43.19	–	1,525	13.62	11,191	FL
Georgia	10	56,581	57.14	10	no ballots			42,439	42.86	–	14,142	14.28	99,020	GA
Illinois	11	105,528	44.09	11	96,275	40.23	–	37,531	15.68	–	9,253	3.86	239,334	IL
Indiana	13	118,670	50.41	13	94,375	40.09	–	22,386	9.51	–	24,295	10.32	235,431	IN
Iowa	4	37,568	40.70	–	45,073	48.83	4	9,669	10.47	–	−7,505	−8.13	92,310	IA
Kentucky	12	74,642	52.54	12	no ballots			67,416	47.46	–	7,226	5.08	142,058	KY
Louisiana	6	22,164	51.70	6	no ballots			20,709	48.30	–	1,455	3.40	42,873	LA
Maine	8	39,140	35.68	–	67,279	61.34	8	3,270	2.98	–	−28,139	−25.66	109,689	ME
Maryland	8	39,123	45.04	–	285	0.33	–	47,452	54.63	8	−8,329	−9.59	86,860	MD
Massachusetts	13	39,244	23.08	–	108,172	63.61	13	19,626	11.54	–	−68,928	−40.53	170,048	MA
Michigan	6	52,139	41.52	–	71,762	57.15	6	1,660	1.32	–	−19,623	−15.63	125,561	MI
Mississippi	7	35,456	59.44	7	no ballots			24,191	40.56	–	11,265	18.88	59,647	MS
Missouri	9	57,964	54.43	9	no ballots			48,522	45.57	–	9,442	8.86	106,486	MO
New Hampshire	5	31,891	45.71	–	37,473	53.71	5	410	0.59	–	−5,582	−8.00	69,774	NH
New Jersey	7	46,943	47.23	7	28,338	28.51	–	24,115	24.26	–	22,828	18.72	99,396	NJ
New York	35	195,878	32.84	–	276,004	46.27	35	124,604	20.89	–	−80,126	−13.43	596,486	NY
North Carolina	10	48,243	56.78	10	no ballots			36,720	43.22	–	11,523	13.56	84,963	NC
Ohio	23	170,874	44.21	–	187,497	48.51	23	28,126	7.28	–	−16,623	−4.30	386,497	OH
Pennsylvania	27	230,686	50.13	27	147,286	32.01	–	82,189	17.86	–	83,400	18.12	460,161	PA
Rhode Island	4	6,680	33.70	–	11,467	57.85	4	1,675	8.45	–	−4,787	−24.15	19,822	RI
South Carolina	8	no popular vote		8	no popular vote			no popular vote			–	–	–	SC
Tennessee	12	69,704	52.18	12	no ballots			63,878	47.82	–	5,826	4.36	133,582	TN
Texas	4	31,169	66.59	4	no ballots			15,639	33.41	–	15,530	33.18	46,808	TX
Vermont	5	10,577	20.84	–	39,561	77.96	5	545	1.07	–	−28,984	−57.12	50,748	VT
Virginia	15	90,083	59.96	15	no ballots			60,150	40.04	–	29,933	19.92	150,223	VA
Wisconsin	5	52,843	44.22	–	66,090	55.30	5	579	0.48	–	−13,247	−11.08	119,512	WI
TOTALS:	296	1,835,140	45.29	174	1,340,668	33.09	114	872,703	21.54	8	494,472	12.2	4,051,605	US
TO WIN:	149													

==== States that flipped from Whig to Democratic ====
- Kentucky
- Tennessee

==== States that flipped from Democratic to Know-Nothing ====
- Maryland

==== States that flipped from Whig to Republican ====
- Massachusetts
- Vermont

==== States that flipped from Democratic to Republican ====
- Connecticut
- Iowa
- Maine
- Michigan
- New Hampshire
- New York
- Ohio
- Rhode Island
- Wisconsin

==== Close states ====
States where the margin of victory was under 5%:

1. Louisiana 3.40% (1,455 votes)
2. Illinois 3.86% (9,253 votes)
3. Ohio 4.30% (16,623 votes)
4. Tennessee 4.36% (5,826 votes) (tipping point state for Buchanan victory)

States where the margin of victory was under 10%:

1. Kentucky 5.08% (7,226 votes)
2. New Hampshire 8.00% (5,582 votes)
3. Iowa 8.13% (7,505 votes)
4. Missouri 8.86% (9,442 votes)
5. Maryland 9.59% (8,329 votes)
6. Connecticut 9.61% (7,720 votes)

== Congressional certification ==
During the joint session of Congress to count the electoral votes, a dispute occurred over Wisconsin's slate. The electors of Wisconsin, delayed by a snowstorm, did not cast their votes for Frémont and Dayton until several days after the appointed time and sent a certificate mentioning this fact. When the votes for the state were opened by acting Vice President James Mason, he counted them over the objections of the leadership of both Houses of Congress.

== See also ==
- Inauguration of James Buchanan
- Origins of the American Civil War
- Third Party System
- 1856–57 United States House of Representatives elections
- 1856–57 United States Senate elections
- American election campaigns in the 19th century
- History of the United States (1849–1865)
- History of the United States Democratic Party
- History of the United States Republican Party

== Works cited ==
- Abramson, Paul; Aldrich, John; Rohde, David (1995). Change and Continuity in the 1992 Elections. CQ Press. ISBN 0871878399.
- McPherson, James (1988). Battle Cry of Freedom. Oxford University Press. ISBN 9780195038637.
