= Wigan (surname) =

Wigan is a surname, and may refer to:

- Alfred Wigan (1814–1878), English actor-manager
- Sir Frederick Wigan, 1st Baronet (1827–1907), English merchant
- Gareth Wigan (1931–2010), British agent, producer and studio executive
- Horace Wigan (1815–1885), English actor and dramatist
- Hugh Wigan (fl. 1386–1407), English politician
- John Wigan (physician) (1696–1739), British physician, poet and medical author
- John Tyson Wigan (1877–1952), British army officer and politician
- Neil Wigan, British diplomat
- Willard Wigan (born 1957), English sculptor of microscopic art

== See also ==
- Wiggan
