= The Wig (disambiguation) =

The Wig is a 2005 South Korean horror film.

The Wig may also refer to:

- The Wig (1925 film), a German silent comedy film
- Gerry "The Wig" Wiggins (1922–2008), American jazz pianist and organist
- A sub-plot of the 2012 film 3 A.M.
- The Wig, a 1960 novel by Charles Wright
- Wigmore Hall, a concert hall in Marylebone, London

== See also ==
- Wig (disambiguation)
