= Wigwam (disambiguation) =

A wigwam is a single-room Native American dwelling.

Wigwam or The Wigwam may also refer to:

== Places ==
- Wigwam (Chicago), the 1860 National Republican Convention Headquarters in Chicago, Illinois
- Wigwam (Chula, Virginia), a historic home near Chula, Amelia County, Virginia
- Wigwam, the family home of Major Israel McCreight in Du Bois, Clearfield County, Pennsylvania
- Wigwam, Colorado, an unincorporated community in El Paso County, Colorado
- The Wigwam (Litchfield Park, Arizona) a 1929-built hotel on the National Registry of the Historic Hotels of America
- Wigwam Inn, an outstation and former resort and fishing lodge at the Indian Arm fjord in Vancouver, British Columbia, Canada
- Wigwam River, a tributary of the Elk River that flows through Montana, USA and British Columbia, Canada
- Anderson High School Wigwam, an indoor arena in Anderson, Indiana, USA
- Paddy's Wigwam, a nickname for Liverpool Metropolitan Cathedral in Liverpool, Merseyside, England
- The Wigwam, a nickname for Braves Field, Boston, Massachusetts
- The Wigwam, a nickname for Jacobs Field, Cleveland, Ohio
- The Wigwam, former name of the National Union Convention in Philadelphia, Pennsylvania, USA
- Wigwam Point, location of the Annisquam Harbor Light in the Annisquam neighborhood of Gloucester, Massachusetts, USA

== Companies and brands ==
- Wigwam Hotel (also The Wigwam or Wigwam Resort), in Litchfield Park, Arizona
- Wigwam Mills, a manufacturer of socks & headwear
- Wigwam Motel, Route 66 landmarks
- Wigwam Stores Inc., a defunct department store chain

== Music ==
=== Bands ===
- WigWam (duo), a 2006 British duo as a collaboration between Betty Boo and Alex James
- Wigwam (Finnish band), a Finnish progressive rock band active from 1968 onwards
- Wigwam (Welsh band), a Welsh indie rock band
- Wig Wam, a Norwegian retro glam metal band founded in 2001

=== Songs ===
- "Wigwam" (Bob Dylan song), a song by Bob Dylan from the 1970 studio album Self Portrait
- "Wigwam", a song by Sonny Stitt and Eddie "Lockjaw" Davis from the 1955 album Jazz at the Hi-Hat
- "Wigwam", a song by Chick Corea from the 1999 album Change
- "Wigwam", a song by Beady Eye from the 2011 album Different Gear, Still Speeding

== Other ==
- Operation Wigwam, an underwater nuclear bomb test
- The Wigwam, c. 1847 burletta by Shirley Brooks
- Wigwam, a local lodge of the Improved Order of Red Men
- Wigwam burner, a wood waste burner

== See also ==
- Tipi, the portable home of the Plains Indians
- Wig (disambiguation)
- Wam (disambiguation)
