= Wigwag =

Wigwag, wig wag, or wig-wag may refer to:

== Signalling devices ==
- Wigwag (railroad), a type of railroad grade crossing signal once used in the United States
- Wigwag (UK level crossing), a pair of alternately flashing lights used in the UK for various road warnings
- Wigwag (flag signals), a type of flag signal
- Wig-wag (sound stage), a red light indicating filming is in progress
- Wig-wag (automobile), headlight flasher
- Wig wag (truck braking systems), a mechanical arm indicating low brake pressure

== Other uses ==
- Wigwag (magazine), an American magazine published 1988 to 1991
- Curly Wurly, an English candy bar, known as Wigwag in Canada

== See also ==
- Wigwam
- Wigwig
