= Whig =

Whig or Whigs may refer to:

== Parties and factions ==
=== In Australia ===
- True Whig Party (Australia), a satirical political party

=== In the British Isles ===
- Whigs (British political party), one of two political parties in England, Great Britain, Ireland, and later the United Kingdom, from the 17th to 19th centuries
  - Whiggism, the political philosophy of the British Whig party
  - Radical Whigs, a faction of British Whigs associated with the American Revolution
  - Patriot Whigs or Patriot Party, a Whig faction
- A nickname for the Liberal Party, the UK political party that succeeded the Whigs in the 1840s
- The Whig Party, a supposed revival of the historical Whig party, launched in 2014
- Whig government, a list of British Whig governments
- Whig history, the Whig philosophy of history
- A pejorative nickname for the Kirk Party, a radical Presbyterian faction of the Scottish Covenanters during the 17th-century Wars of the Three Kingdoms
  - Whiggamore Raid, a march on Edinburgh by supporters of the Kirk faction in September 1648

=== In the United States ===
- A term used at the time of the American Revolution for Patriots (supporters of the revolution against England)
- Whig Party (United States), a major political party which operated from 1834 to 1856

=== In Liberia ===
- True Whig Party, also known as the "Liberian Whig Party", Liberia's overwhelmingly dominant political party from 1878 to 1980

== Music ==
- The Whigs (band), a 2000s garage rock band
- The Afghan Whigs, a 1990s indie rock band

== Newspapers ==
- Cecil Whig of Cecil County, Maryland, United States
- The Kingston Whig-Standard of Kingston, Ontario, Canada, originally named the British Whig
- Brownlow's Whig, an East Tennessee, USA, newspaper published under various titles
- Quincy Herald-Whig of Quincy, Illinois, United States

== Other uses ==
- American Whig-Cliosophic Society, also known as "Whig-Clio", a political, literary, and debating society at Princeton University
- White House Iraq Group, also known as the White House Information Group
- Confederate States Whig Party, a fictional political party created by alternate history author Harry Turtledove
- WHIG-CD, a low-power television station (channel 30, virtual 31) licensed to serve Rocky Mount, North Carolina, United States; see List of television stations in North Carolina

== See also ==
- Wig (disambiguation)
- Tory
