= Wig Out =

Wig Out may refer to:

- "Wig-Out", a 1986 song by Died Pretty from Free Dirt
- "Wig Out", a 1992 song by Pete Rock & CL Smooth from Mecca and the Soul Brother
- "Wig Out" (Luke Cage), an episode of Luke Cage
