= Wiggans =

Wiggans is a surname. Notable people with the surname include:

- Keith Wiggans (born 1981), American soccer player
- Richard Engelbrecht-Wiggans, American economist
- John Wiggans, a survivor in the fatal accident involving Singapore Airlines Flight 006.

== See also ==
- Wiggans Hills, rock hills in Antarctica
- Wigan, town in England
- Wiggan, surname
