= Wiggan =

Wiggan is a surname. Notable people with the surname include:

- Derek Wiggan (born 1992), Canadian football player
- Trenton Wiggan (born 1962), Jamaican footballer

== See also ==
- Wigan, town in England
- Wiggans, surname
