= Remote head (camera) =

In cinematography, remote heads, also known as 'hot' heads, or robos (robotic cameras) are motorized mechanical and/or electronic devices that are used as a mount for film, video or digital cinema cameras and can be controlled from a distance. In most cases this refers to control not only of the physical orientation of the camera body, such as pan (horizontal), tilt (vertical), roll (on axis for Dutch angle), but also control over many or all camera functions – focus, zoom, color balance, gamma correction, camera menus and other related functions.

Remote heads are typically used in locations where it is difficult or dangerous to place a human camera operator. Because of their flexibility and their ability to create dynamic moving camera shots or angles remote heads have become common on camera cranes., or jibs, as well as other modern film and television technology such as cable-suspended camera systems, rail camera systems and underwater camera systems. The use of remote heads on camera cranes allowed the advancement of longer, smaller and telescoping camera cranes, which would not have been possible with a camera operator on board

Remote heads are critical in motion-control camera systems that are used for match moving, repeatable moves, and integration with movie computer-generated imagery for visual effects.

Remote heads differ from pan–tilt–zoom cameras in that they are independent of the camera itself and thus can function with many different camera models and are designed to integrate with other television and video industry equipment.
