= Spydercam =

Cable-suspended camera system used for filming

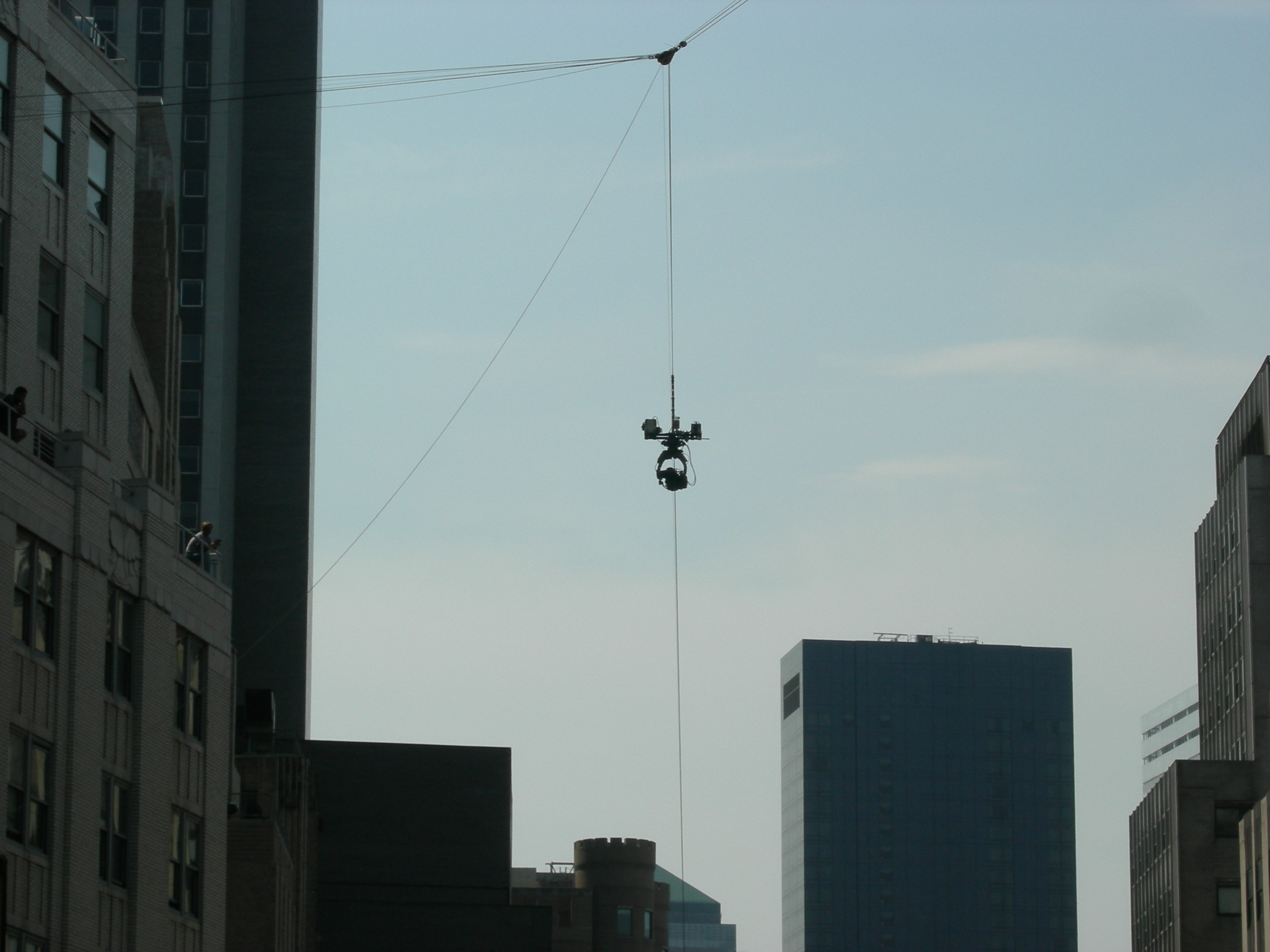
The Spydercam

Spydercam is a cable-suspended camera system, and rigging system used in making motion pictures, television and at athletic stadiums. It uses computer controlled winches to drive synthetic lines connected to a crane, truss or buildings to achieve multidimensional, repeatable movement. Spydercam is used as an alternative to other camera movement systems.

According to the maker's website, Spydercam has been used in the following films:

- Maestro (2023)
- Emancipation (2022)
- Don't Look Up (2021)
- The Terminal List Season 1 (2022)
- Black Adam (2021)
- Spirited (2022)
- Just Beyond (2021)
- Clifford the Big Red Dog (2021)
- The Suicide Squad (2021)
- Black Widow (2021)
- Mulan (2020)
- Bird Box (2019)
- The OA season 2 (2019)
- Triple Frontier (2019)
- Avengers: Endgame (2019)
- Watchmen Season 1 (2019)
- Lady and the Tramp (2019)
- Game of Thrones Season 8 (2019)
- Dumbo (2019)
- Bumblebee (2018)
- Aquaman (2018)
- Mission: Impossible – Fallout (2018)
- Game of Thrones Season 7 (2018)
- A Wrinkle in Time (2018)
- Black Panther (2018)
- Kong: Skull Island (2017)
- Transformers: The Last Knight (2017)
- Spider-Man: Homecoming (2017)
- Guardians of the Galaxy Vol. 2 (2017)
- Downsizing (2017)
- Kevin Hart: What Now? (2016)
- Assassin's Creed (2016)
- Help (2016)
- Monster Trucks (2016)
- Jurassic World (2015)
- Terminator Genisys (2015)
- Avengers: Age of Ultron (2015)
- Straight Outta Compton (2015)
- Furious Seven (2015)
- Teenage Mutant Ninja Turtles (2014)
- Dawn of the Planet of the Apes (2014)
- Enchanted Kingdom 3D (2014)
- The Amazing Spider-Man 2 (2014)
- Noah (2014)
- The Lone Ranger (2013)
- A Good Day to Die Hard (2013)
- The Hunger Games: Catching Fire (2013)
- World War Z (2012)
- John Carter (film) (2012)
- Life of Pi (2012)
- The Amazing Spider-Man (2012)
- Thor (2011)
- Premium Rush (2010)
- Transformers: Dark of the Moon (2011)
- Cowboys and Aliens (2010)
- Shutter Island (2010)
- Predators (2010)
- Wall Street: Money Never Sleeps (2010)
- Iron Man 2 (2010)
- Fame (2009)
- Transformers: Revenge of the Fallen (2009)
- Angles & Demons (2009)
- Hancock (2008)
- Pacific War (2008)
- Bedtime Stories (2008)
- Gamer (2009)
- Indiana Jones and the Kingdom of the Crystal Skull (2008)
- Jumper (2008)
- Beverly Hills Chihuahua (2008)
- 10,000 BC (2008)
- I Am Legend (2007)
- The Company (2007)
- I Now Pronounce You Chuck and Larry (2007)
- Live Free or Die Hard (2007)
- Spider-Man 3 (2007)
- Ghost Rider (2007)
- D-War (2007)
- Apocalypto (2006)
- Superman Returns (2006)
- Mission: Impossible III (2006)
- Night at the Museum (2006)
- Pirates of the Caribbean: Dead Man's Chest (2006)
- The Shaggy Dog (2006)
- Flicka (2006)
- Stick It (2006)
- Fun with Dick and Jane (2005)
- The Exorcism of Emily Rose (2005)
- Stealth (2005)
- Bewitched (2005)
- Constantine (2005)
- Flight of the Phoenix (2004)
- The Aviator (2004)
- Blue Collar Comedy Tour Rides Again (TV, 2004)
- Spider-Man 2 (2004)
- The Terminal (2004)
- The Alamo (2004)
- The Creature of the Sunny Side Up Trailer Park (2004)
- Stuck on You (2003)
- Angels in America (TV miniseries, 2003)
- Elf (2003)
- The Haunted Mansion (2003)
- The League of Extraordinary Gentlemen (2003)
- Terminator 3: Rise of the Machines (2003)
- Charlie's Angels: Full Throttle (2003)
- The Italian Job (2003)
- Bruce Almighty (2003)
- Top Speed (2003)
- The 75th Annual Academy Awards (TV, 2003)
- Tears of the Sun (2003)
- Catch Me If You Can (2002)
- Stuart Little 2 (2002)
- Minority Report (2002)
- Spider-Man (2002)
- A.I. Artificial Intelligence (2001)
- Journey into Amazing Caves (2001)
- Mission: Impossible 2 (2000)
- Temptation Island (2000)
- Ripley's Believe It or Not (1999)
- Everest (1998)
- Batman & Robin (1997)
- Dante's Peak (1997)
- Long Kiss Goodnight (1996)
- Cliffhanger (1993)

== History ==
Founded in 1992 as a stunt and rigging company, Spydercam provides suspended camera work. A team of riggers, programmers and engineers add their experiences in Motion control, VFX, stunts, and rope rigging.

== General Systems ==
The manufacturers of Spydercam claim their software is entirely modular, allowing them to work with producers to create their specific shot, but Spydercam also outlines three general systems they call Bullet, Falcon, and Talon.

=== Bullet ===
This is a simple, point-to-point rig with a single axis. The Bullet rig is the quickest to set up and implement, and can be rigged horizontally or vertically. Often used for live events, it can start and stop very quickly. The camera is held tight to the highline, which allows for a more stable shot.

=== Falcon ===
According to the Spydercam website, the Falcon is the most versatile and widely used of the rigs offered. With two axes, the Falcon allows both horizontal and vertical movement along two separate lines.

=== Talon ===
This is a three dimensional rig that allows movement anywhere within its volumetric space. With the most control and variety out of the three general rigs offered by Spydercam, Talon is a sophisticated system.

== Competitors ==
While Spydercam is based in the United States with systems in place around the world and is largely used for film and commercial work, there are several competitors on the market of cable-suspended camera systems. Some of these specialize in other areas of film, including sports footage.

Spidercam is a European company that was established in the early 2000s and is mainly used for sporting events such as the Pakistan Super League, Bundesliga, Rugby World Cup, UEFA Champions League, Premier League, Ultimate Fighting Championship, US Open (tennis), Indian Premier League, and French Open.

Skycam and Cablecam are consolidated under Skycam, which preceded the other systems mentioned. Skycam was established in 1984 in the United States. It can replicate previsual plans to a high degree of accuracy.
