= Cable-suspended camera system =

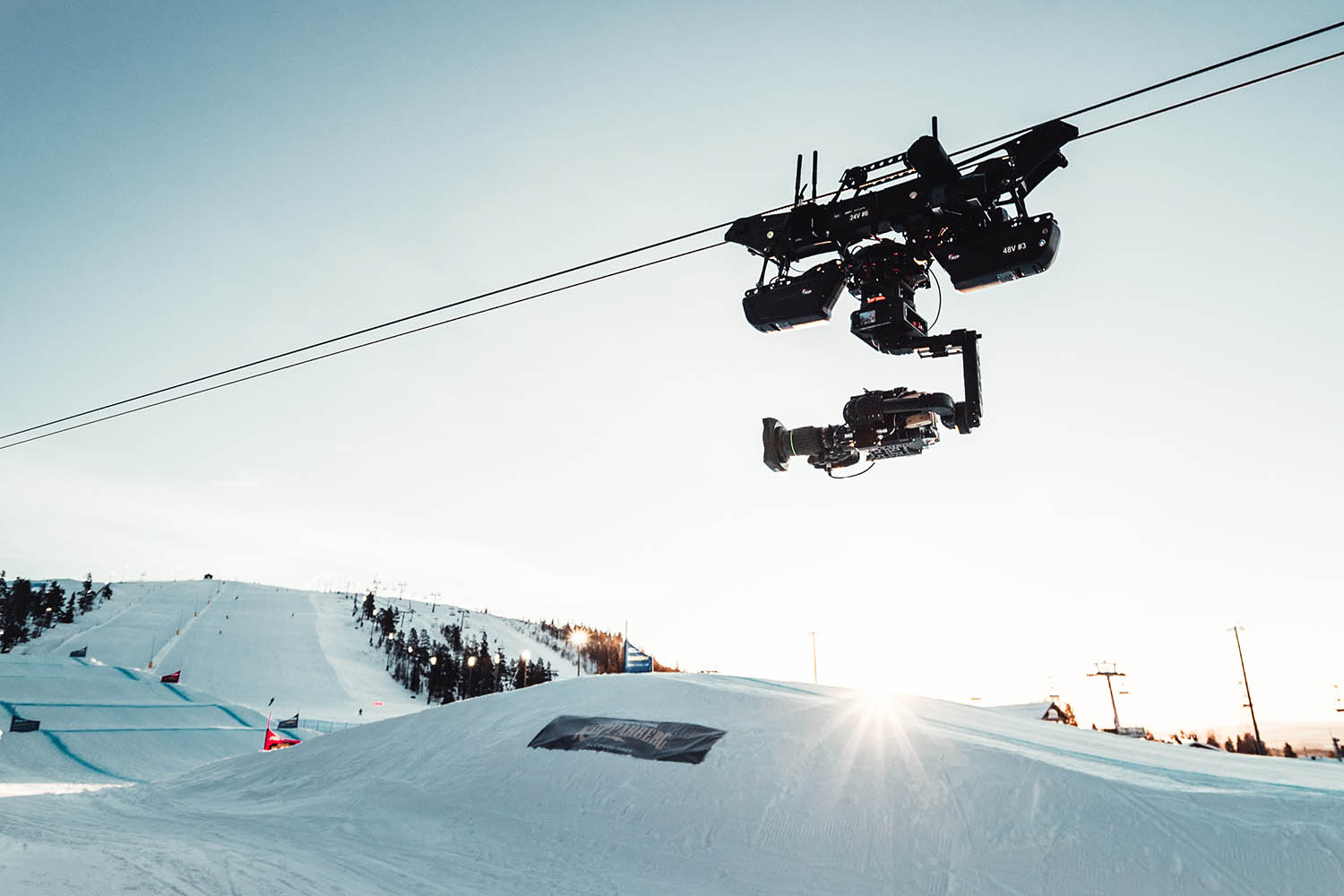
1D (point to point) cable cam system for live TV broadcast of sports and events - Defy Dactylcam and Newton stabilized camera head

A cable-suspended camera system is a system of cables above or along an area to be filmed or videoed, over or along which an attached camera head travels to achieve required camera angles.

There are two broad types cable-suspended camera systems: fixed-cable and moving-cable types.

== Fixed-cable type ==
In fixed-cable type cable-suspended camera systems, the cable is attached at fixed anchor points and a motorized camera head travels along the fixed cable. This kind of system can be advantageous over longer distances and where it might be difficult to set up winches with moving cables, or in no fly zones. Some use cases have a camera head running along the ground in trolley mode for a kind of tracking shot.

In recent years, fixed-cable suspended camera systems has become popular for professional live TV broadcast and film production to shoot sport and entertainment events. A widely used system is the Defy Dactylcam, which travels along the cable with a motor, and the Newton stabilized camera head which controls the camera and lens. This system is for example used at the live TV broadcast of Major League Baseball, UEFA (football), track and field, concerts and ski competitions.

There has also been an upsurge of low budget amateur cablecam systems for action cameras and even cellphones that is used for: amateur sports videos, hobby video, lower budget film and video, photography, and motion time-lapse footage.

Companies selling fixed-cable suspended camera systems include: Newton Nordic, Flyline, Defy Products, High Sight, Wiral and Syrp.

== Moving-cable type ==
In moving-cable type cable-suspended camera systems, cables are attached to winches at their ends to allow movement of an attached camera head between multiple cables. There are several variants of moving-cable type cable-suspended camera systems, including:

- 3D moving-cable type cable-suspended camera systems, a.k.a. suspended flying camera systems, with four cables moving an attached camera head in three dimensions;
- 2D moving-cable type cable-suspended camera systems, with two cables moving an attached camera head vertically and horizontally;
- Point-to-point (1D) moving-cable type cable-suspended camera systems where there is one cable pulling an attached camera head between two fixed points.

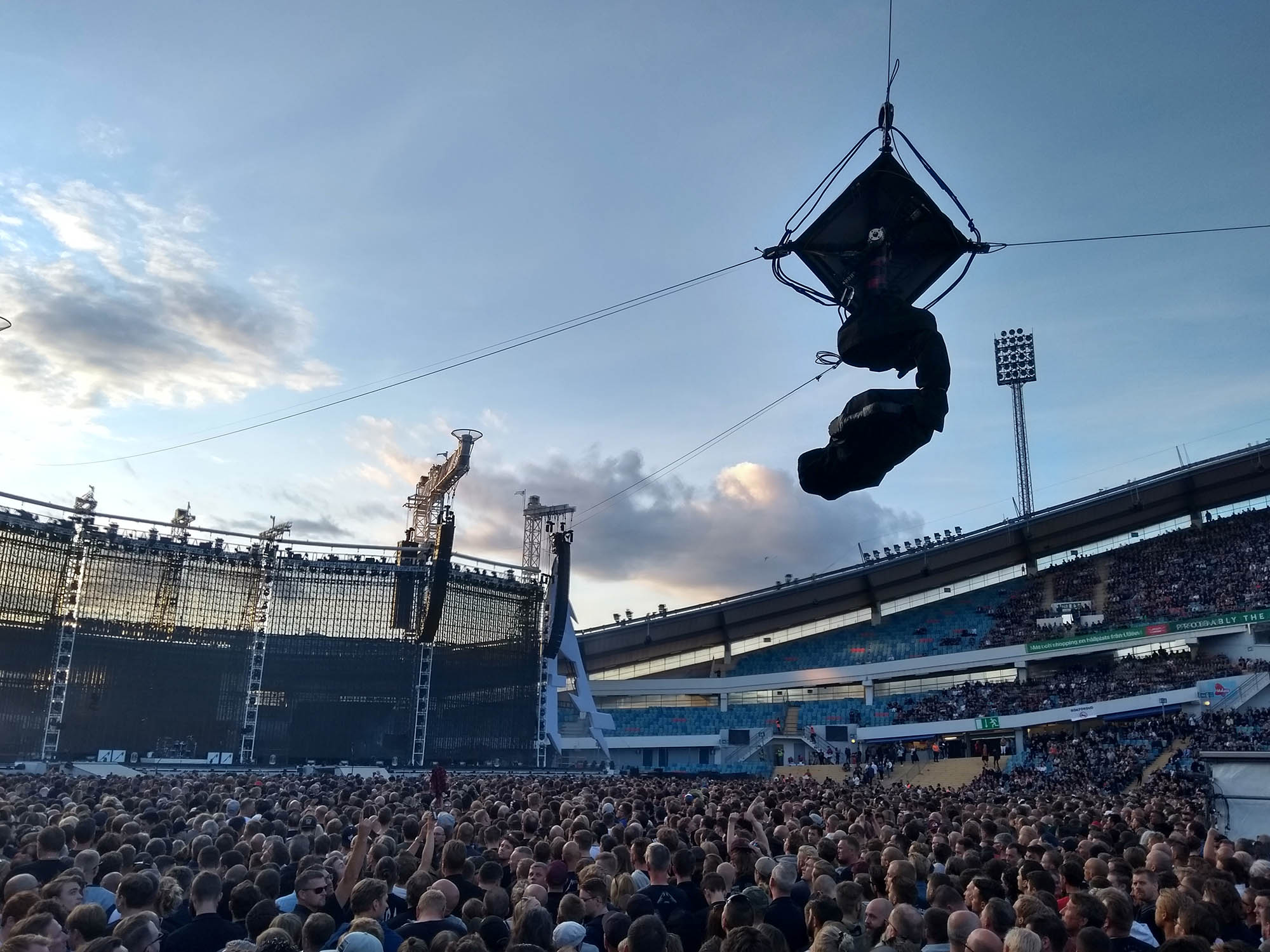
3D cable cam - Spidercam Light with Newton stabilized head at Metallica tour 2019

=== 3D moving-cable ===
3D moving-cable type cable-suspended camera systems, a.k.a. suspended flying camera systems, are used by broadcasters and video production companies to create dynamic video footage of sporting events and cultural events like concerts. They are a type of cable robot.

Advantages over mounted cameras include reducing or eliminating the need for crane shots, using camera cranes or jibs that might obstruct spectator sight lines or take up valuable space or interfere with a shot. Advantages over drones include lack of noise, no battery life concerns, and crowd safety.

Commercial 3D moving-cable type cable-suspended camera systems include: EagleEye, Spydercam, SkyCam, Spidercam, JoyMechanix, and RobyCam 3D.

Events that have been photographed using 3D moving-cable type cable-suspended camera systems include: NFL games (e.g., when the Skycam captured the Chicago Bears' Cordarrelle Patterson's 102-yard kickoff return touchdown on October 20, 2019), WWE matches, Tennis, Cricket, Rugby, Soccer, concerts (Spidercam), swimming and esports (RobyCam).

=== 2D moving-cable ===
2D moving-cable type cable-suspended camera systems typically move in the horizontal (X) and vertical (Z) planes are used by broadcasters and video production companies to create dynamic video footage where other types of systems are impractical or impossible to set up because of venue/location.

Commercial 2D moving-cable type cable-suspended camera systems include the RobyCam 2D and CamCat's CamCat 2D. and the RTS RopeClimber that has for example been used at the Oscars 2019 and 2020

=== Point-to-point (1D) moving-cable ===
Point-to-point moving-cable type cable-suspended camera systems are used to draw a camera head or dolly between two fixed points. These systems tend to move faster than 3D and 2D systems and are thus used for sports where speed is a factor like horse-racing, skiing and extreme sports.

Commercial point-to-point (1D) moving-cable type cable-suspended camera systems include Robyline (used at Biathlon World Cup, FIS Alpine Ski World Cup and Supercoppa Italiana). Other examples include JoyMechanix’s Sailfish, a high-speed point-to-point cable camera system used at the Saudi Cup international horse race and the Wimbledon Championships.
