= Technocrane =

Telescopic camera crane

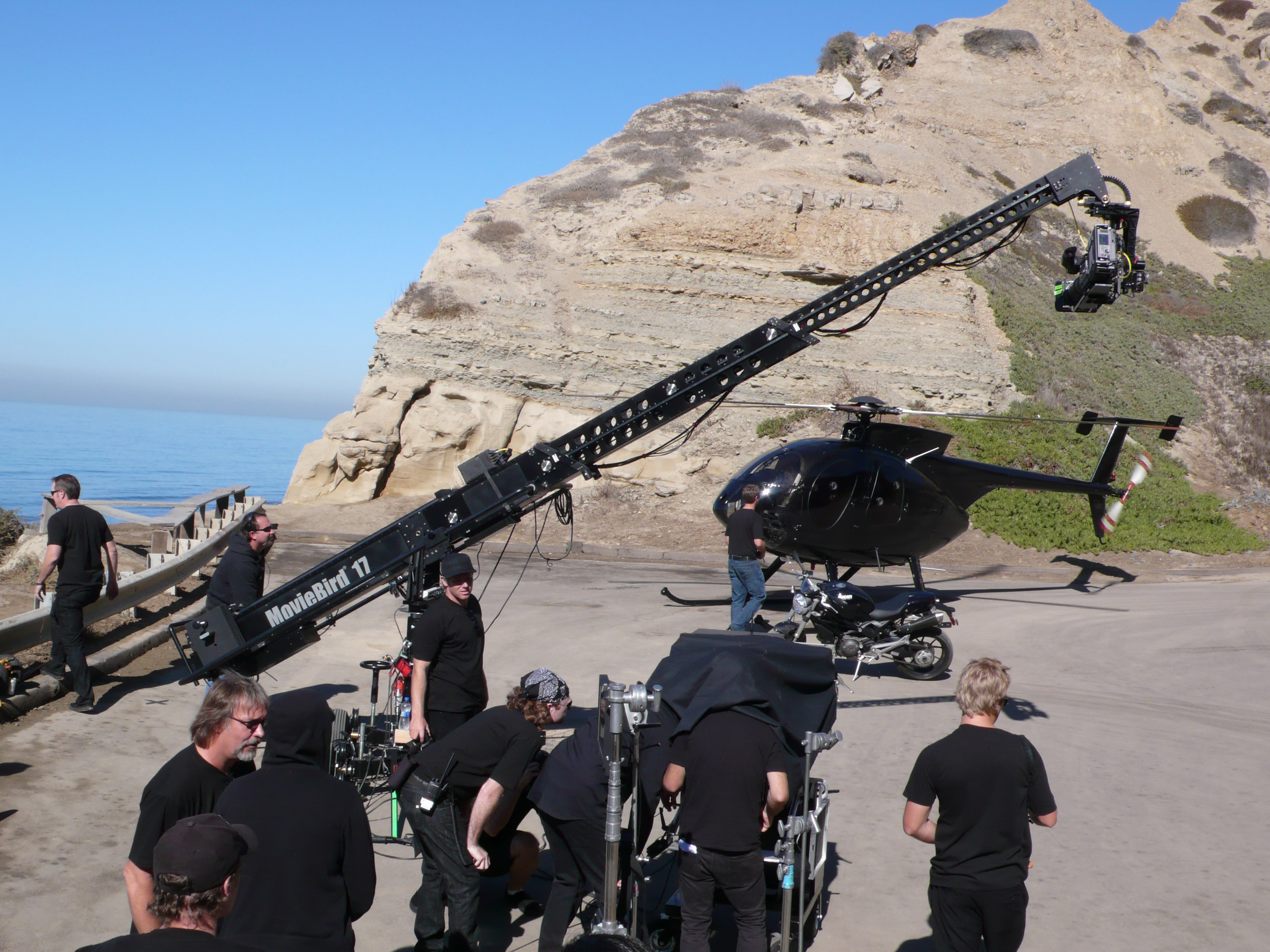
Technocrane used for filming a Visa Black Card commercial in 2010

A technocrane is a telescopic camera crane widely utilised in the film industry and in television production. Originally commissioned, manufactured, named and marketed by Technovision Ltd. in London, United Kingdom, the first TechnoCrane was exhibited by Technovision during Photokina Expo in Cologne, Germany in September 1986.

Today, TechnoCrane derivatives are available from several different manufacturers, such as SuperTechno, MovieBird, Filmotechnic, Servicevision among others, and come in many different sizes and various specifications, with extended arms reaching 10 feet (3.0 m) to 100 feet (30 m).

The camera is mounted on a remote head on the end of the crane arm and is remote controlled by a camera operator at a control desk. The Technocrane can telescope at variable speeds on demand. It allows camera moves that cannot be achieved using a jib arm crane and camera dolly, and the telescoping can be used to compensate for the camera moving in an arc called "arc compensation".

== History ==
The Technocrane was first introduced to Hollywood by Simon Jayes in the late 1980s who was one of the first Technovision trained crane technicians in London. Similar camera crane technology was also introduced to the Soviet film industry by Ukrainian Academy Award winning cinema engineer Anatoliy Kokush ( Filmotechnic ) at the same period of time.

In 1999, the Society of Camera Operators (S.O.C.) presented their technical achievement award to Technovision, Gyula Mester and Keith Edwards for the "First Telescopic Camera Crane" and for their significant contributions to the Art, Craft and Safety of the Camera Operator.

In 2005, the Academy of Motion Picture Arts and Sciences presented Academy Awards to Horst Burbulla, Gyula Mester and Keith Edwards for the invention and development of the Technocrane.

== Usage ==
Productions that have used the Technocrane or the later SuperTechnocrane include Titanic, the Harry Potter films, the Lord of the Rings films, and all the James Bond films of the late 1990s and 2000s, among many others.

== Gallery ==
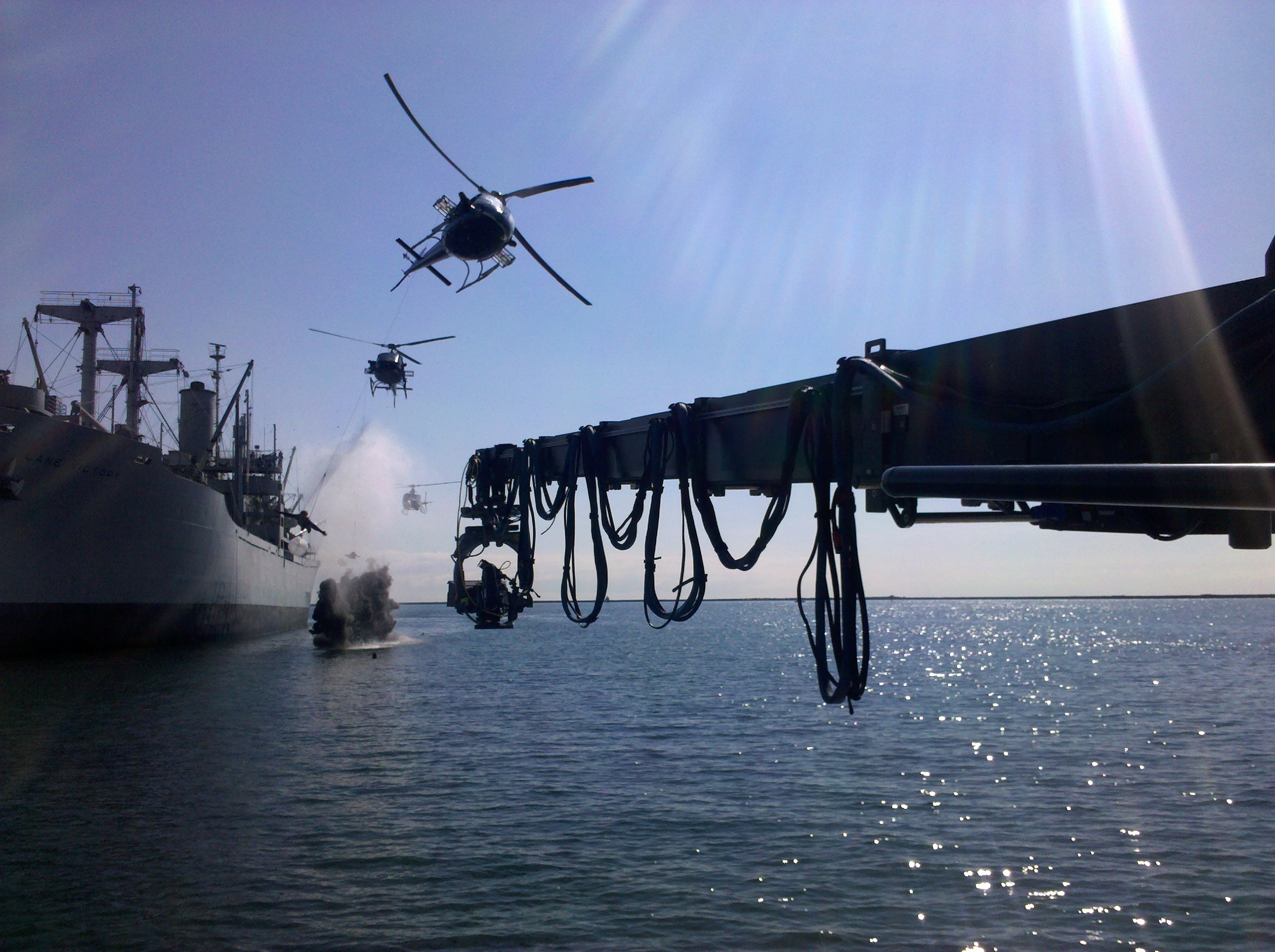
Technocrane used during the filming of X-Men: First Class (2011)

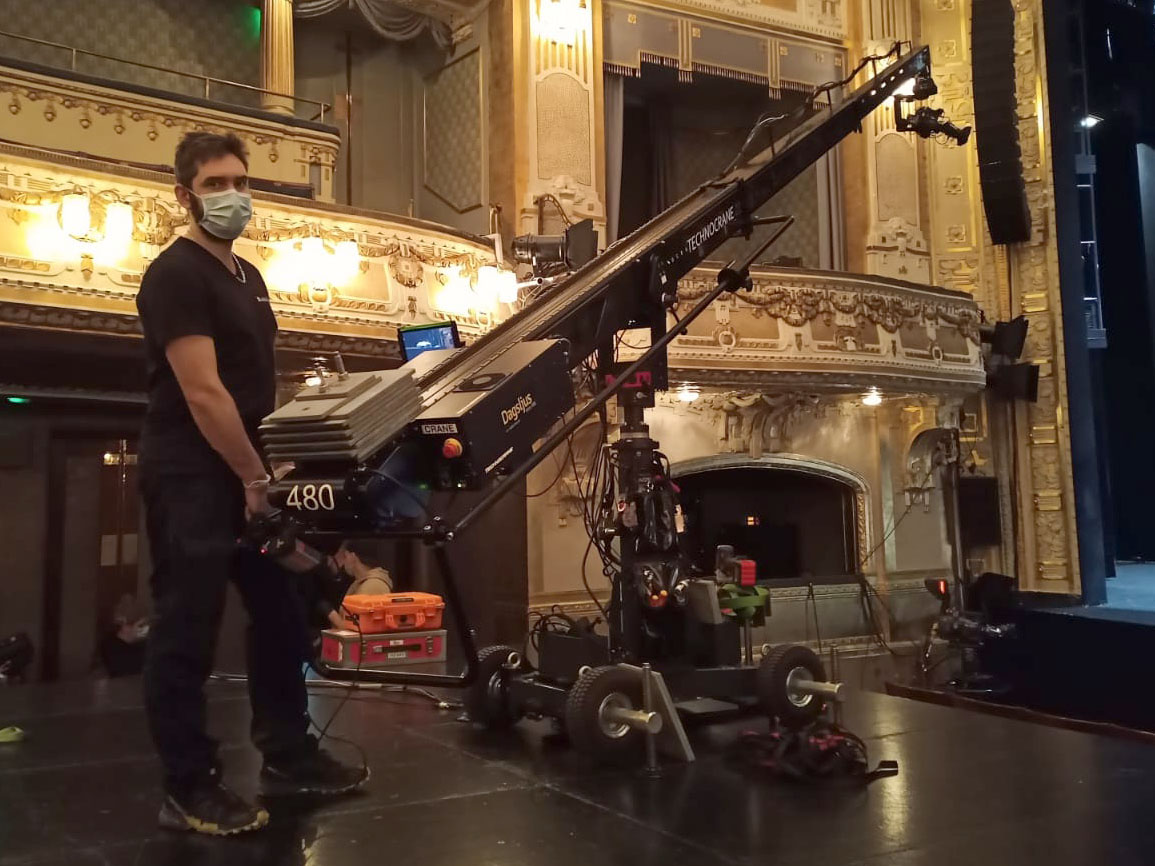
Technocrane with remote camera head

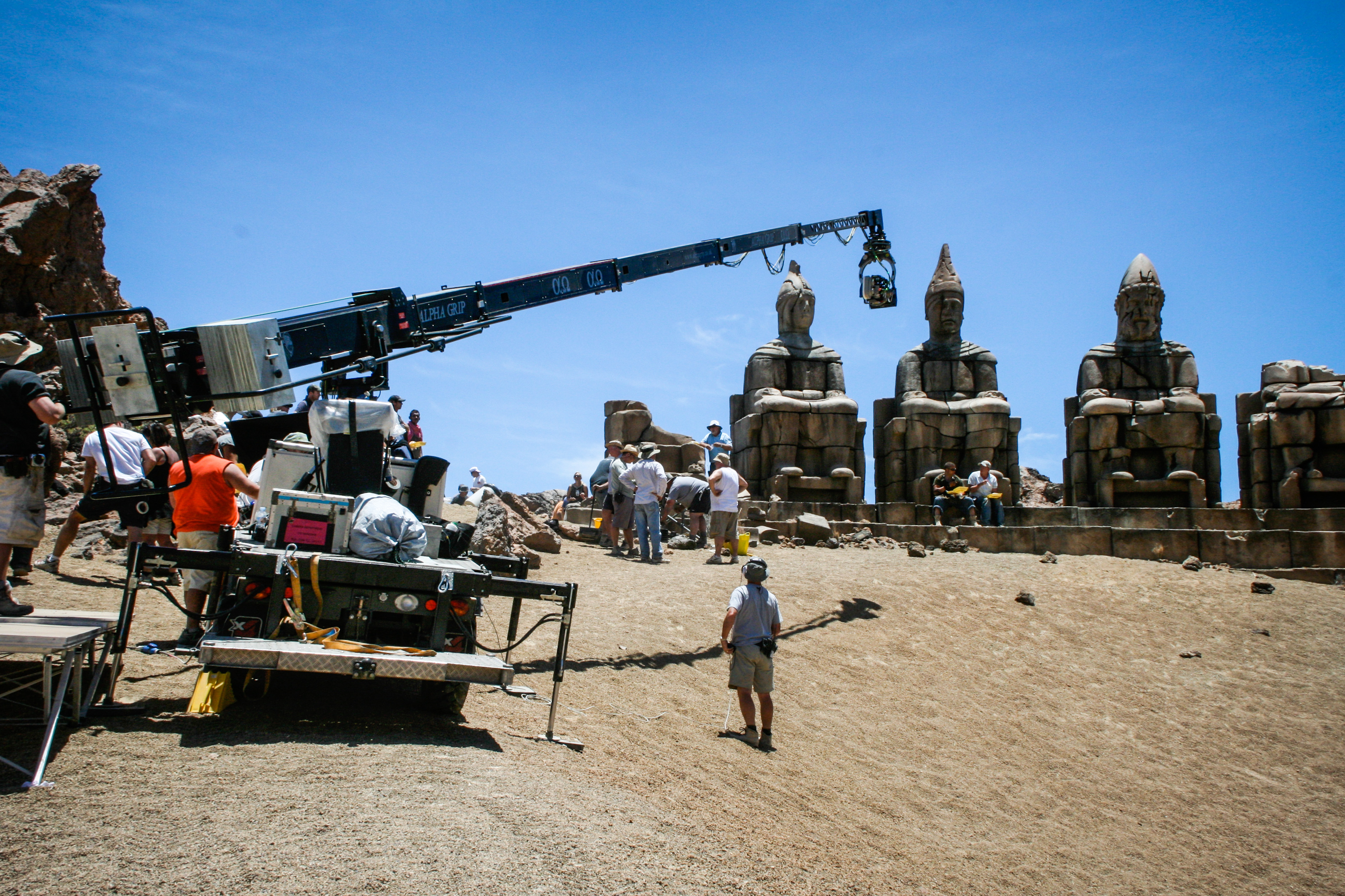
Technocrane in production

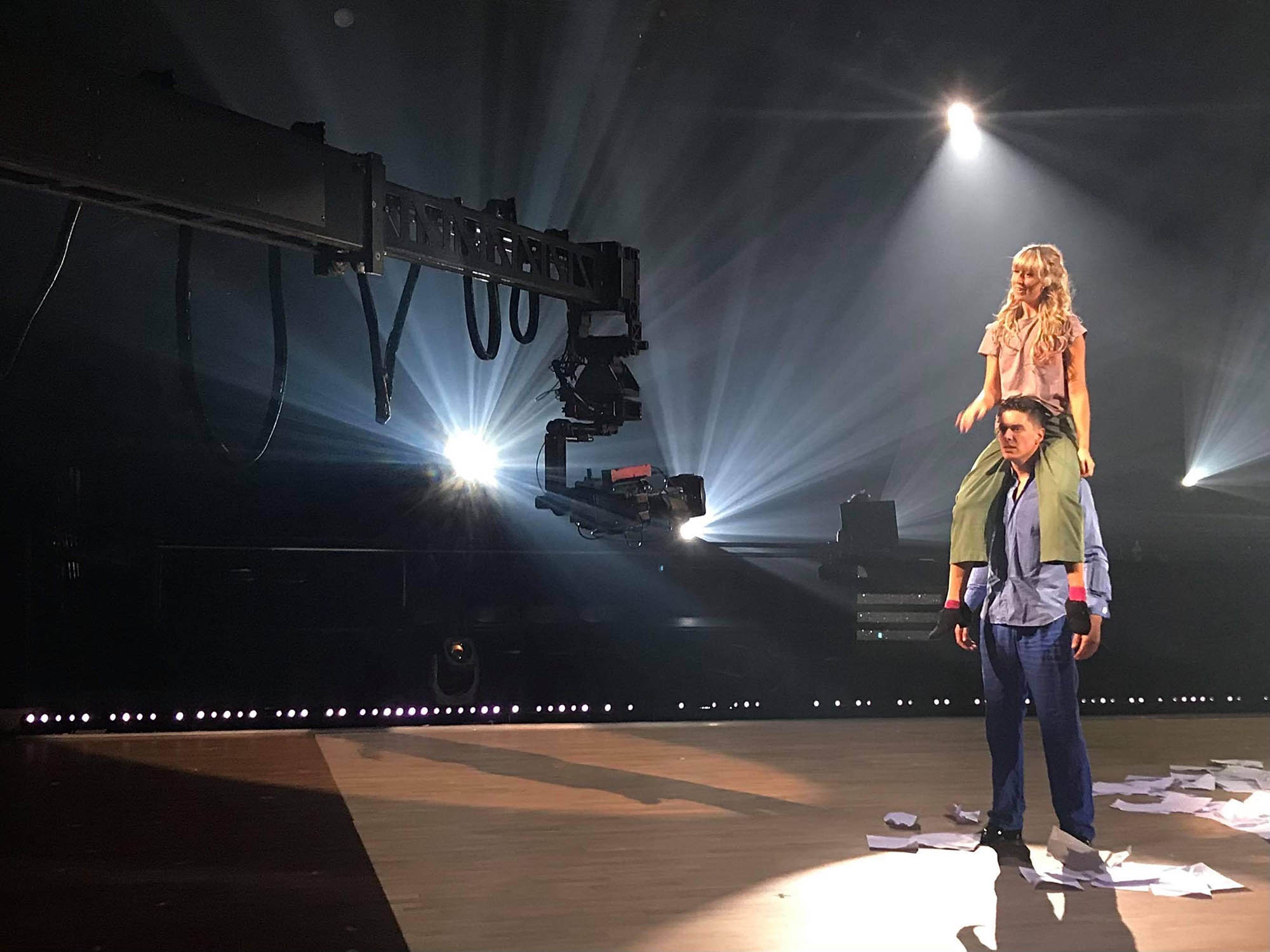
Moviebird 52, telescopic camera crane with stabilized head to control the camera at a live TV show in Norway

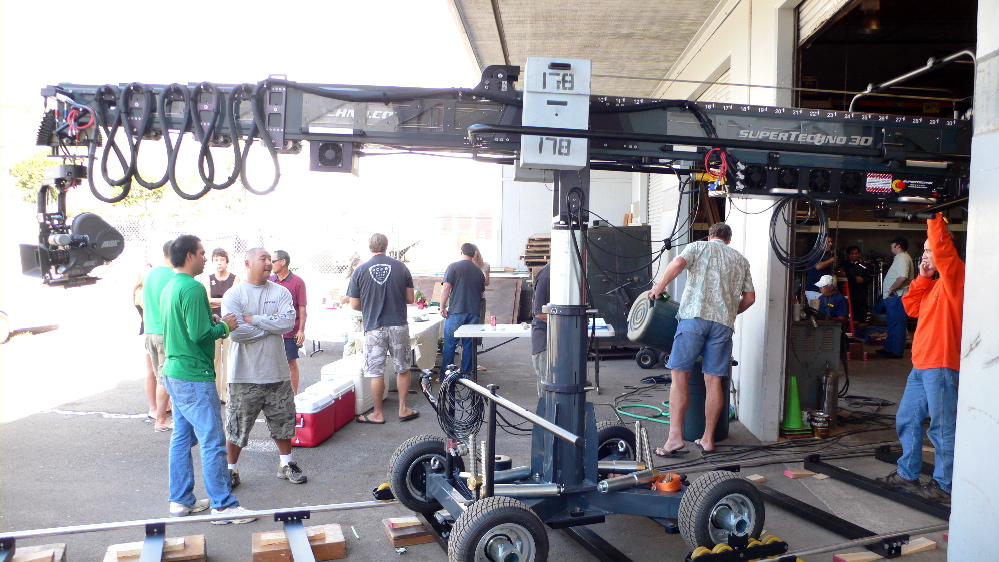
SuperTechno 30

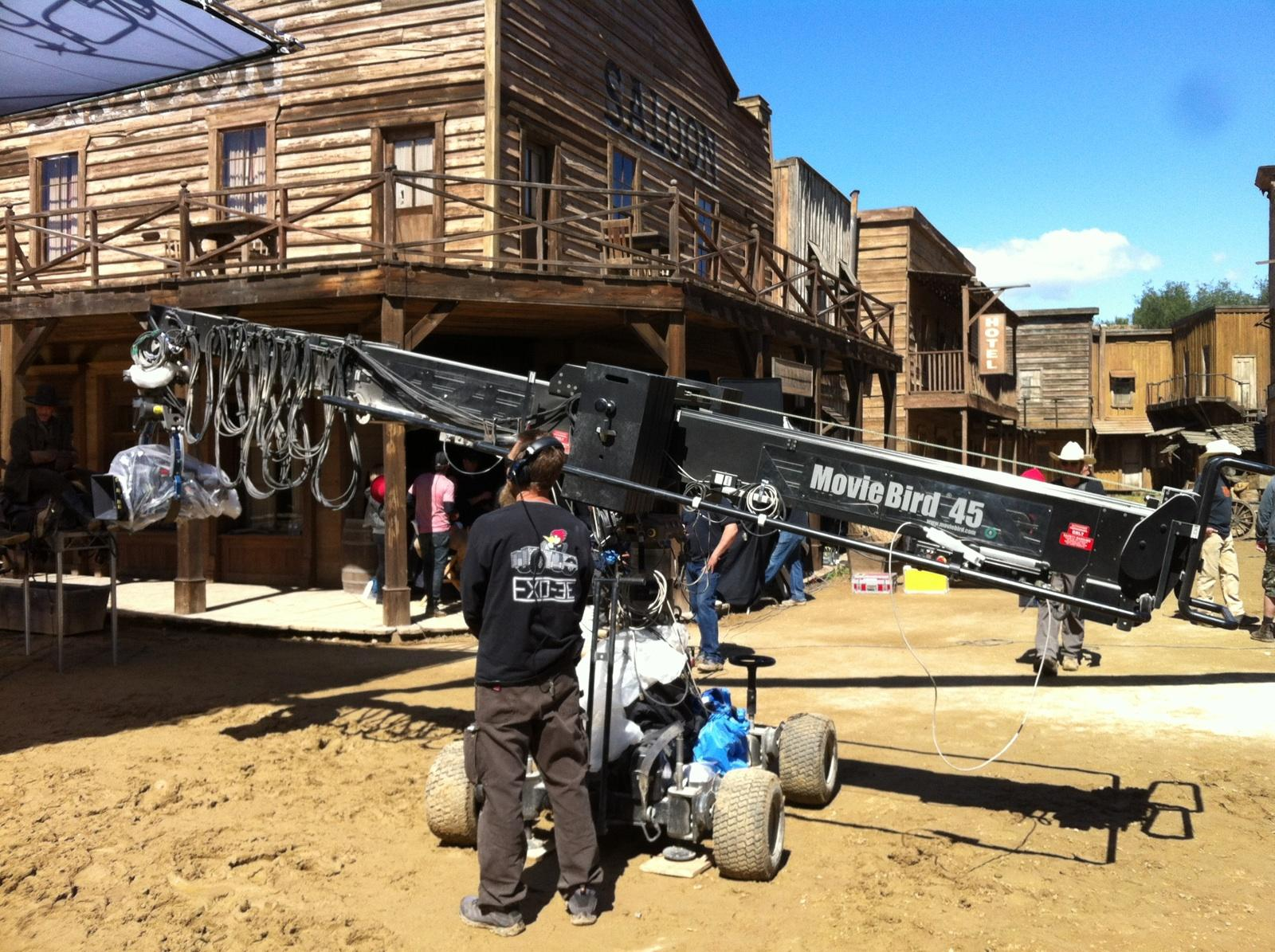
MovieBird 45 (45 feet (14 m))

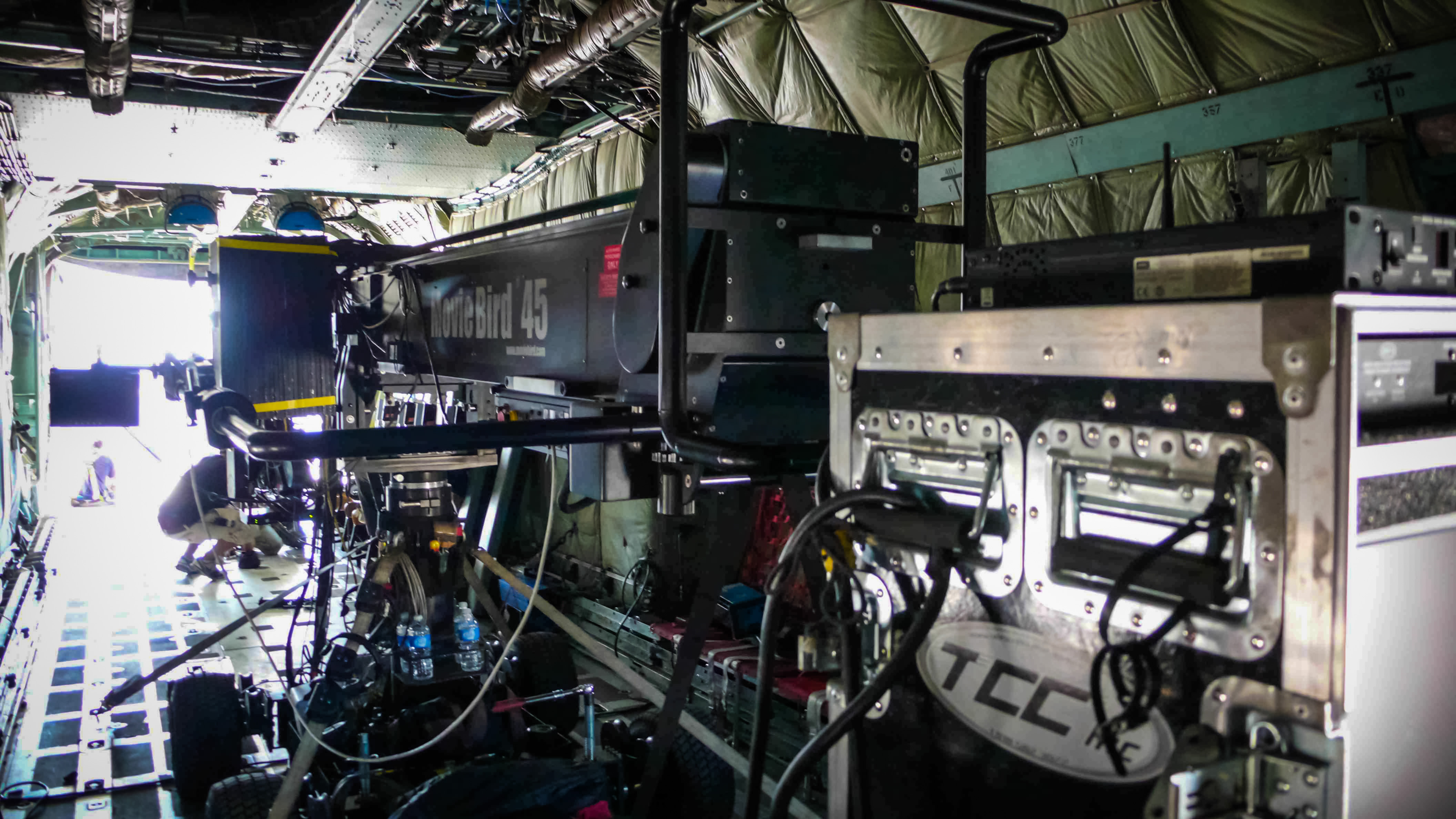
MovieBird Crane mounted inside airplane

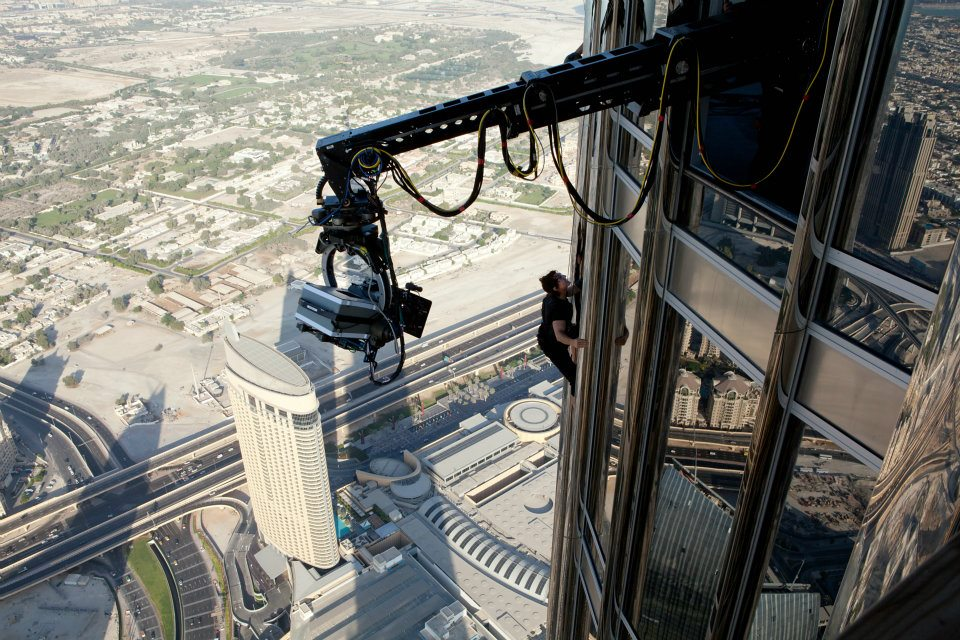
Technocrane used during the filming of Ghost Protocol

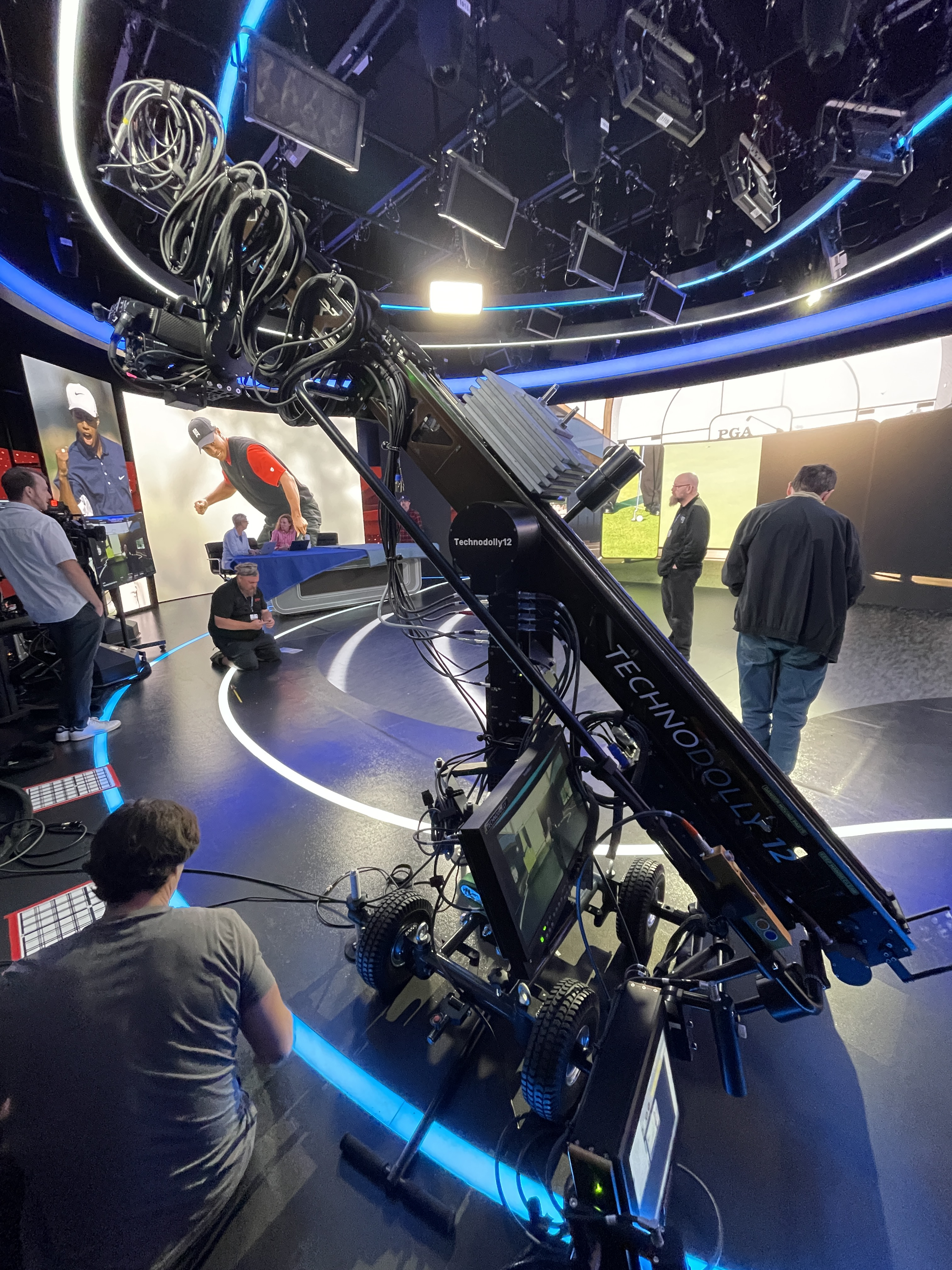
A TechnoDolly 12 installed at PGA Tour Studios

== See also ==
- Crane shot
