= Cable robots =

Cable-based parallel manipulator robot

Cable-driven parallel robots (also called cable robots, cable-suspended robots or wire-driven robots) are a type of parallel manipulators in which flexible cables are used as actuators. One end of each cable is reeled around a rotor twisted by a motor, and the other end is connected to the end-effector. One famous example of cable robots is Skycam which is used to move a suspended camera in stadiums. Cables are much lighter than rigid linkages of a serial or parallel robot, and very long cables can be used without making the mechanism massive. As a result, the end-effector of a cable robot can achieve high accelerations and velocities and work in a very large workspace (e.g. a stadium). Numerous engineering articles have studied the kinematics and dynamics of cable robots (e.g. see In The International Journal of Robotics Research 27.9 (2008): 1007–1026. for an enhanced of the concept). Dynamic analysis of cable robots is not the same as that of other parallel robots because cables can only pull an object but they cannot push. Therefore, the manipulator is able to perform a task only if the force in all cables are non-negative. Accordingly, the workspace of cable robots is defined as a region in space where the end-effector is able to exert the required wrench (force and moment vectors) to the surroundings while all cables are in tension (non-negative forces). Many research works have focused on workspace analysis and optimization of cable robots. Workspace and controllability of cable robots can be enhanced by adding cables to structure of the robot. Consequently, redundancy plays a key role in design of cable robots.

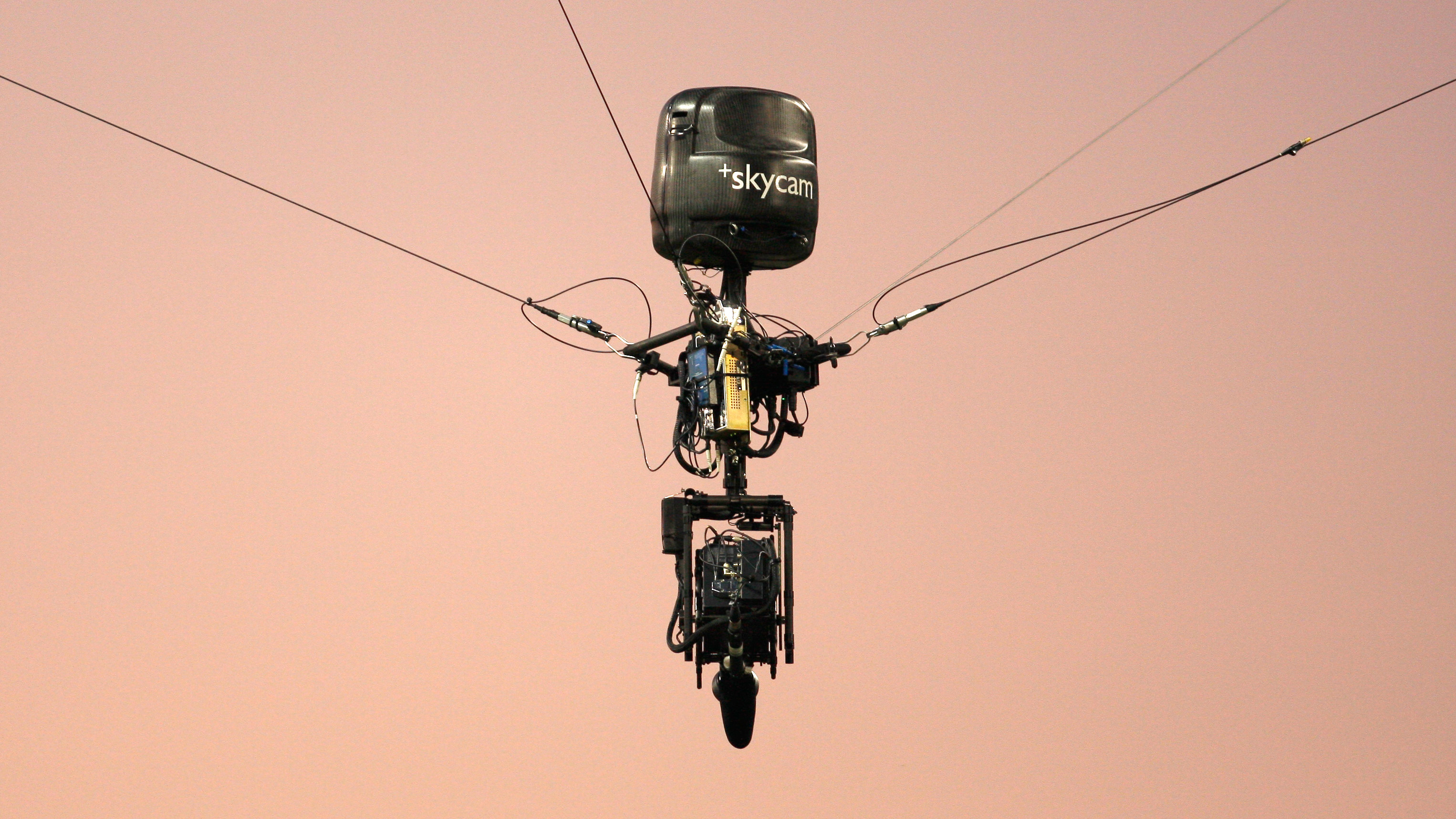
Skycam, an example of a cable robot used to position TV broadcast cameras over a sports playing field.

However, workspace analysis and obtaining positive tension in cables of a redundant cable robot can be complicated. In general for a robot, infinite solution may exist, but for a redundant cable robot a solution is acceptable only if all the elements of tension vector are non-negative. Finding such a solution can be challenging, especially if the end-effector is working along a trajectory and a continuous and smooth distribution of tensions is desired in cables. In literature, several methods have been presented to solve such problems a computational method is introduced based on Particle Swarm Optimization method to find continuous smooth solutions along a trajectory for a general redundant cable robot).

In addition to parallel cable robots, cables have been used as actuators in serial robots as well. By employing cables as actuators a mechanism can be designed much smaller and lighter (e.g. a human-like finger mechanism actuated by cables is presented in).

== See also ==
- Cable transport
