= Spidercam =

Camera movement system

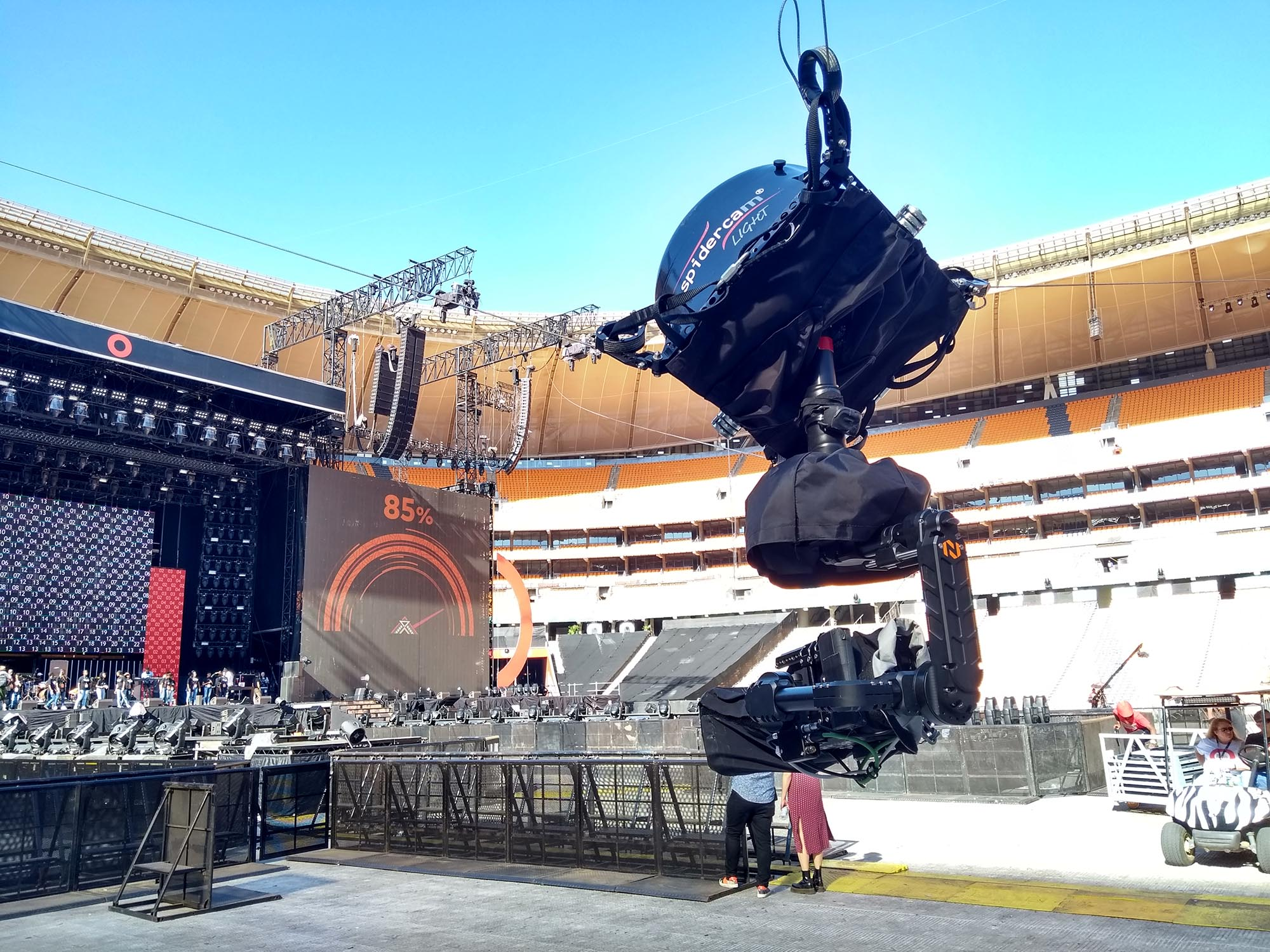
Spidercam Light 3D cable cam system with Newton stabilized camera head. Enabled a flying TV camera at Beyoncé & Jay-Z's On the Run II Tour in 2018.

The Spidercam is a cable-suspended camera system which enables film and television cameras to move both vertically and horizontally over a predetermined area, typically the playing field of a sporting event such as a cricket pitch, football field or a tennis court. The name Spidercam is a trademark. The Spidercam system is modeled after Skycam, which preceded it, having been invented in the United States in 1984.

The Spidercam operates with four motorized winches positioned at each corner at the base of the covered area, each of which controls a Kevlar cable connected to a gyro-stabilized camera-carrier, or dolly. By controlling the winding and unwinding of the cables, the system allows the dolly to reach any position in the three-dimensional space. The inputs of the Spidercam "pilot" are processed by software which forwards the commands to the winches via fiber optic cables. Two of the Kevlar cables also have fiber optic cables woven into them to carry commands to the remote-controlled camera head and bring the camera's high definition signal back to the control station. Since 2019 the remote camera head that Spidercam uses is a NEWTON S2 gyro-stabilized camera head developed by Newton Nordic in Sweden. This remote head, which houses the camera, provides pan, tilt and roll movement and also controls focus, zoom and irising of the lens. A specially trained Spidercam camera operator controls the NEWTON camera head next to the pilot. Spidercam GmbH has an in-house engineering department which works on improving the Spidercam and developing special applications to meet customer requests. They are for example offering augmented reality in live TV broadcast.

== History ==
Jens C. Peters, the founder of CCSytems Inc., developed the Spidercam system. The Austrian company began in 2000 specifically to create a fully functional cable-suspension system for a camera transporting device, capable of moving not only laterally or horizontally along the ground, but also vertically, thus providing full three-dimensional movement while covering wide areas both indoors as well as outdoors, using standardised and reliable components as modules.

The first successful test of the system took place in a large event hall in Carinthia, Austria in 2003. In 2004 the system was employed for the first time on a television production in Austria. That same year, Peters teamed up with the German company PMT Professional Motion Technology GmbH, a rental house specializing in camera motion technology. After some modifications inspired by PMT, the Spidercam entered the market. Its initial uses were for live events such as concerts—Kylie Minogue in Australia, Robbie Williams in Great Britain and the Police in Argentina—television programs such as the Eurovision Song Contest in Greece and Finland, and major sporting events such as the European Swimming Cup in Hungary, Red Bull X-Fighters in Mexico and Spain and international football matches. PMT also provides a system for 35mm film cameras.

A new partner, the Austrian businessman Herbert Neff, joined Peters in 2007 and a new company, Spidercam GmbH, was founded. Since then further business relationships have been created in a number of countries, such as Sweden, Great Britain, France, Portugal, Italy, Poland, Tunisia, Australia and China, which provide staff, equipment and local know-how for the broadcast and film-production companies in those countries. To meet the growing demand for spidercam services, Spidercam GmbH offers training for prospective operators.

In cricket, Spidercam was first used in the Indian Cricket League (ICL), followed by the semi-finals of the 2010 Indian Premier League (IPL) in Mumbai and then in Champions League Twenty20 in South Africa. It was used for the first time in a test match at the Gabba in Brisbane during the 2012 South African tour of Australia.

== Sports ==
Spidercams are commonly used in the FIFA World Cup, The Ashes, Bangladesh Premier League, Indian Premier League, Pakistan Super League, Bundesliga, Rugby World Cup, UEFA Champions League, English Premier League, Ultimate Fighting Championship, US Open (tennis) and French Open.

== Entertainment ==
A Spidercam system toured with American singer Beyoncé and rapper Jay-Z On the Run II Tour. Metallica used two Spidercam systems on their WorldWired Tour. Spidercam has also been used at MTV Video Music Awards, the Grateful Dead "Fare The Well" concerts in Santa Clara, CA and Chicago, IL in June & July, 2015, the Cold Play Music of the Spheres tour 2022-2025 and The Proms. Spidercam was also used in production of Taylor Swift: The Eras Tour.

== Incidents ==
=== Motor Racing ===
The 2013 Coca-Cola 600 was disrupted when a cablecam (falsely reported to be a spidercam) crashed onto the racetrack.

=== Cricket ===
If the ball hits the Spidercam with conclusive evidence, the ball is called dead and any runs scored or wickets taken do not count and the ball is rebowled.

During the fourth Test in the 2014–2015 Gavaskar-Border Trophy Test Series between India and Australia, the Australian captain Steve Smith missed a catch, which was blamed on a supporting wire being within his line of sight.

In a Group B match between Mumbai Indians and Sydney Sixers on 22 October 2012 during the 2012 Champion's League Twenty20, a shot from Dinesh Karthik hit the Spidercam. The hit didn't result in any damage to the camera system and the camera continued its broadcasting. The ball was called dead.

On 23 January 2016 at the SCG, during the fifth ODI between Australia and India, Virat Kohli hit the Spidercam off a John Hastings delivery. The ball still reached the boundary, but was called dead instead.

During the 2019 Indian Premier League, Jaydev Unadkat hit a shot that caused a controversy while being caught, as his franchise Rajasthan Royals thought that the ball deflected off a cable from which the Spidercam was suspended. The ball was not ruled dead as the third umpire did not have any conclusive evidence.

On Day 2 of the 2022 Boxing Day Test at the Melbourne Cricket Ground between Australia and South Africa, Spidercam knocked the South Africa fast bowler Anrich Nortje to the ground; he was not severely injured and was able to continue bowling. Spidercam was stood down for the rest of the day and for the rest of the test a different operator was used. The camera should not be travelling at heights of under 3.5 metres during a game.

=== Volleyball ===
During a volleyball match at the 2016 Rio Olympics aired on August 8, 2016, the volleyball hit the Spidercam and was ruled out of bounds by the judge. The coach of the USA appealed and was told it is not appealable. According to the rule there must be a minimum of 30 feet (9.1 m) between the court and any objects overhead. The USA went on to win the second match over the Netherlands.

== See also ==
- Skycam
