= Horst Burbulla =

German inventor and entrepreneur

Horst Burbulla (born 1959) is an Oscar-winning German inventor and entrepreneur.

== Life and work ==
Burbulla was born in Poland and came to Bonn with his family at the age of seven. In the early 1980s, he made his first film, Liebe und Tod (Love and Death), in Bonn and Iceland. The North Rhine-Westphalian film subsidy supported the film with 100,000 DM. Unfortunately, this was not enough to rent a flexible mobile camera, so Burbulla built his own model, combining a camera crane system with a telescopic mechanism. In 1981, his Technocrane telescoping crane was first used for Steven Spielberg's film Raiders of the Lost Ark.

In 1982, he founded the Orion company. The film Liebe und Tod was shown at the Locarno International Film Festival, but Burbulla caused more of a stir with his new invention, which Technovision London presented for the first time at a trade fair, Photokina in Cologne, in 1986. He was able to sell a copy of his crane to a Roman film company for 35,000 DM. In the same year, his camera crane was used for the film False Game with Roger Rabbit, thus achieving an international breakthrough.

Initially, Burbulla was financed by Technovision in London, where he manufactured the parts for his cranes on their behalf. Then, after the fall of communism, he moved his company operations to Plzeň in the Czech Republic in 1990.

Burbulla's telescopic cranes brought numerous new possibilities for the use of camera cranes in film and television shoots. The technology is especially needed for complicated camera movements in action films. His crane is currently being used, among other things, in the filming of Avatar: The Way of Water by James Cameron.

== Awards ==
In 2005, Burbulla received the Academy Award of Merit, Class I, for his invention and development of the Technocrane telescoping camera crane. Actress Scarlett Johansson gave the laudation.
