= Jim Rodnunsky =

James Lewis Rodnunsky (July 18, 1956 – June 10, 2011) was a Canadian-born technician, cinematographer, and inventor of the Cablecam system. Cablecam consists of cable-suspended, remote control cameras to film overhead shots. Rodnunsky's Cablecam is now widely used in sporting events, film and television. Rodnunsky's Cablecam is a direct competitor of the Skycam system, which was invented by Garrett Brown.

== Life and career ==
Rodnunsky was born and raised in Edmonton, Alberta. He moved to the San Fernando Valley of Los Angeles, California, as a teen with his parents. He earned bachelor's degrees in economics and political science from the University of California, Los Angeles (UCLA). After college, Rodnunsky further studied both filmmaking and acting.

Rodnunsky first used an early Cablecam prototype to film skiers in the Blackcomb Mountains of British Columbia, Canada, in 1989. Cablecam has since evolved into an "industry standard" for sporting events, according to Variety.

The operator of Cablecam used a joystick to move the camera approximately twelve feet above players at sporting events, such as football games, allowing the camera to film from nearly any angle needed by the director. Variety Magazine called Rodnunsky's Cablecam as one of the technological inventions which permanently changed television coverage of sports events, along instant replays and handheld cameras.

Rodnunsky won several Emmy Awards and three Academy Scientific and Technical Awards from the Academy of Motion Picture Arts and Sciences during his career.

Jim Rodnunsky died from brain cancer on June 10, 2011, at the age of 54. A resident of Granada Hills, Los Angeles, he was survived by his wife, Lisa; three children - Tatiana, Daniel and Alexandra; and two brothers, Serge and Pierre.
