= Jib (camera) =

Crane-like cinematography device

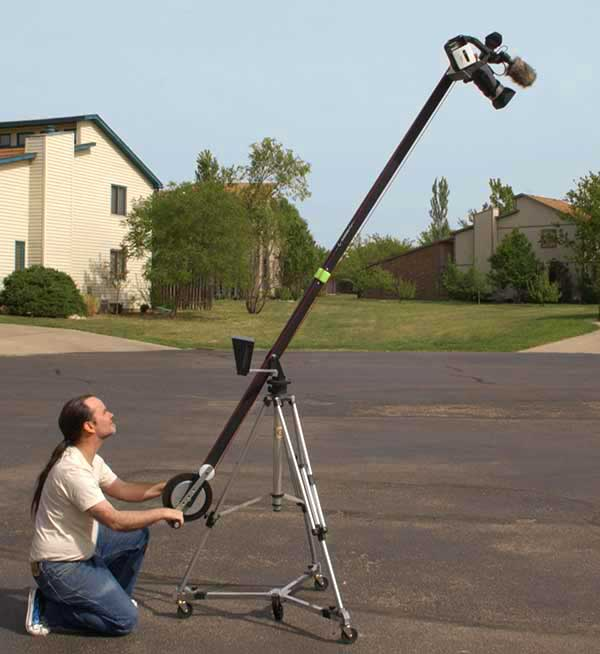
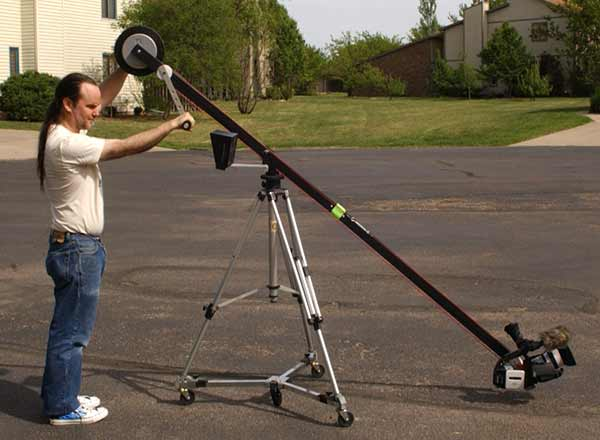
Operating a jib from the rear.

In cinematography, a jib is any boom device used to mount a camera on one end, and a counterweight with camera controls on the other. In principle, it operates like a see-saw, with the balance point located closer to the counterweight, which allows the end of the arm with the camera to move through an extended arc. Typically a jib permits the camera to be moved vertically, horizontally, or a combination of the two. A small jib can be mounted on a tripod, but many larger, purpose-built jibs have their own support stands, often on wheels. Modern jibs are normally modular and can be assembled in various lengths.

== Use ==
A jib can be used for getting high or low shots which are difficult for a hand-held camera operator to get, or shots which need to move a short distance horizontally or vertically, without the expense and safety issues of putting a camera operator on a crane for a crane shot or laying track for a camera dolly. A jib can even be mounted on a dolly for shots in which the camera moves over obstacles such as furniture, when a normal dolly shot could not be used.

== Operation ==
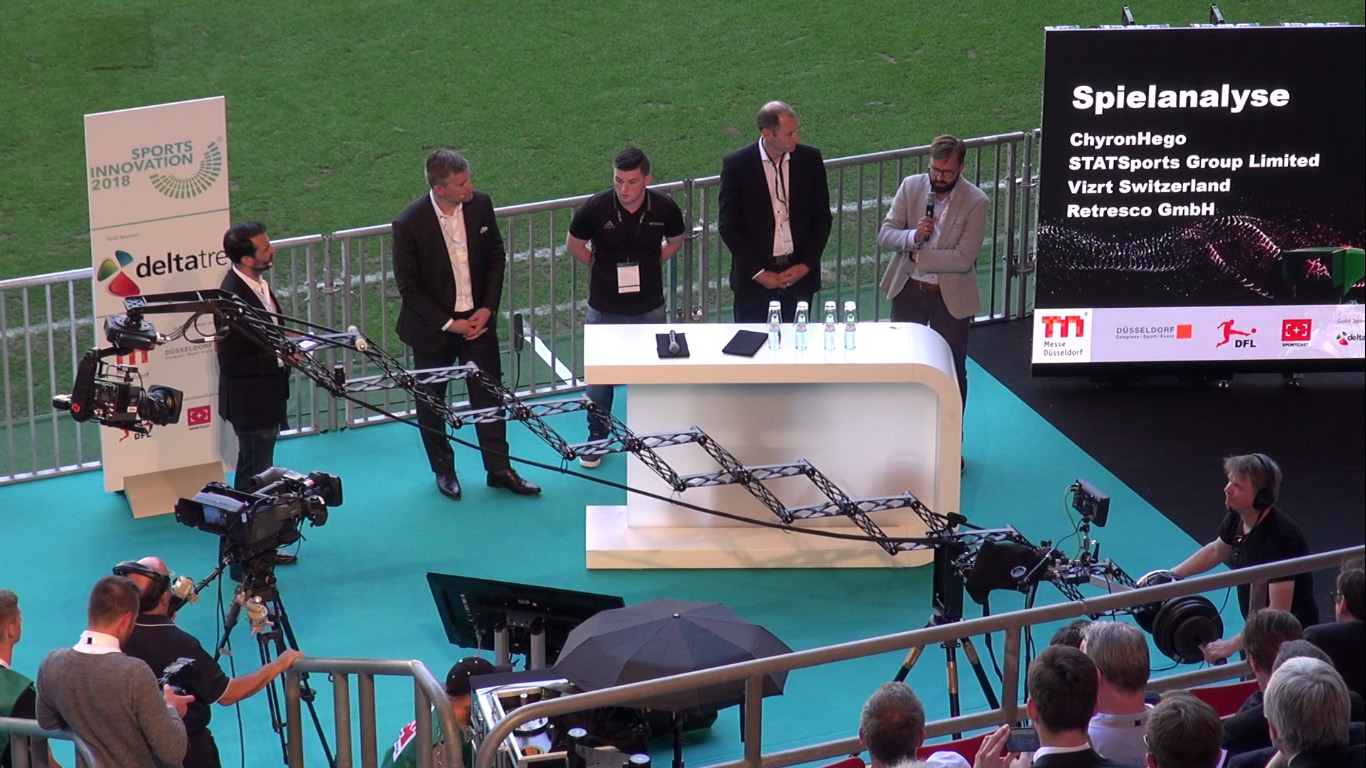
Telescopic X-Jib with Newton stabilized camera head at live TV broadcast

A jib is more complicated than a simple lever, since almost always the camera's aim needs to be controlled independently of the swing of the jib arm. This can be done either by relatively simple mechanical means or by the use of remotely controlled electric servo motors as used in a remote head.

Since the camera operator is usually not able to use the camera's controls directly or look through the camera's viewfinder, a jib is often used in conjunction with a remote control systems for focus, and/or zoom and/or camera function and with a portable video monitor mounted near the jib operator.

A device known as a "hot head" or "remote head" is attached to the camera end of larger jibs. It supports the camera and enables remote pan/tilt functions with focus/zoom control. This setup can be operated by one person, or the circumstance may require two operators. In a two-operator situation, one person operates the jib arm/boom while another operates the pan/tilt/zoom functions of the remote head. An example of this is the Newton stabilized remote head, that stabilizes the camera under fast jib operation and also enables camera roll.

== See also ==
- Tripod head
