= 2013 Coca-Cola 600 =

Auto race held at Charlotte, USA

Race details
- Race 12 of 36 in the 2013 NASCAR Sprint Cup Series
- The 2013 Coca-Cola 600 program cover, with artwork by Sam Bass. "Salute Our Troops!"
- Date: May 26, 2013
- Location: Charlotte Motor Speedway, Concord, North Carolina
- Course: Permanent racing facility
- Course length: 1.5 miles (2.4 km)
- Distance: 400 laps, 600 mi (965.606 km)
- Weather: Overcast with a high temperature around 76 °F (24 °C); wind out of the SSE at 4 miles per hour (6.4 km/h).
- Average speed: 130.521 mph (210.053 km/h)

Pole position
Driver	Denny Hamlin	Joe Gibbs Racing
- Time: 27.604 seconds

Most laps led
Driver	Kasey Kahne	Hendrick Motorsports
- Laps: 161

Winner
No. 29	Kevin Harvick	Richard Childress Racing

Television in the United States
- Network: Fox
- Announcers: Mike Joy, Darrell Waltrip, Larry McReynolds
- Nielsen ratings: 4.1

The 2013 Coca-Cola 600, the 54th running of the race, was a NASCAR Sprint Cup Series stock car race held on May 26, 2013, at Charlotte Motor Speedway in Concord, North Carolina, United States. Contested over 400 laps on the 1.5–mile (2.4 km) oval, it was the twelfth race of the 2013 Sprint Cup Series championship. Kevin Harvick of Richard Childress Racing won the race, his second win in the Coca-Cola 600 and in the 2013 season. Kasey Kahne followed in second while Kurt Busch, Denny Hamlin, and Joey Logano rounded out the top five.

There were 11 cautions for 61 laps and 24 lead changes between 12 different drivers throughout the course of the race. One of the most significant stoppages came from a fallen skycam cable that damaged several cars and injured spectators. The result moved Harvick to the seventh position in the Drivers' Championship, 83 points behind Jimmie Johnson in first and 15 ahead of Paul Menard in eighth. Chevrolet maintained its lead in the Manufacturers' Championship, five points ahead of Toyota and thirteen ahead of Ford, with 24 races remaining in the season.

== Report ==
=== Background ===
Charlotte Motor Speedway, the race track where the race was held.

Charlotte Motor Speedway is a four-turn quad-oval track that is 1.5 miles (2.4 km) long. The track's turns are banked at twenty-four degrees, while the front stretch, the location of the finish line, is five degrees. The back stretch, opposite of the front, also had a five degree banking. The racetrack has seats for 134,000 spectators. Kasey Kahne was the defending race winner after winning the event in the 2012 race.

Before the race, Jimmie Johnson was leading the Drivers' Championship with 423 points, while Carl Edwards stood in second with 379 points. Matt Kenseth followed in the third with 364, five ahead of Dale Earnhardt Jr. in fourth, and fifteen ahead of Clint Bowyer in fifth. Kahne, with 326, was in sixth; tied with Brad Keselowski, who was scored seventh. Eighth-placed Kyle Busch was eight points ahead of Aric Almirola and ten ahead of Kevin Harvick in ninth and tenth. Paul Menard was eleventh with 315, while Jeff Gordon completed the first twelve positions with 311 points. In the Manufacturers' Championship, Chevrolet was leading with 74 points, two points ahead of Toyota. Ford was third after recording only 56 points.

The Coca-Cola 600 was conceived by race car driver Curtis Turner, who built the Charlotte Motor Speedway. It was first held in 1960 in an attempt by NASCAR to stage a Memorial Day weekend race to compete with the open-wheel Indianapolis 500; the two races were held together on the same day starting from 1974. The race is the longest in terms of distance on the NASCAR calendar and is considered by several drivers to be one of the sport's most important races alongside the Daytona 500, the Brickyard 400 and the Southern 500. The long distance makes it the most physically demanding event in NASCAR, and teams adapt to changing track conditions because the race occurs between late afternoon and evening. It was known as the World 600 until 1984 when The Coca-Cola Company purchased the naming rights to the race and renamed it the Coca-Cola World 600 in 1985. It has been called the Coca-Cola 600 every year since 1986 except for 2002 when the name changed to Coca-Cola Racing Family 600.

=== Entry list ===
(R) - Denotes rookie driver.

(i) - Denotes driver who is ineligible for series driver points.

No.	Driver	Team	Manufacturer
1	Jamie McMurray	Earnhardt Ganassi Racing	Chevrolet
2	Brad Keselowski	Penske Racing	Ford
5	Kasey Kahne	Hendrick Motorsports	Chevrolet
7	Dave Blaney	Tommy Baldwin Racing	Chevrolet
9	Marcos Ambrose	Richard Petty Motorsports	Ford
10	Danica Patrick (R)	Stewart–Haas Racing	Chevrolet
11	Denny Hamlin	Joe Gibbs Racing	Toyota
13	Casey Mears	Germain Racing	Ford
14	Tony Stewart	Stewart–Haas Racing	Chevrolet
15	Clint Bowyer	Michael Waltrip Racing	Toyota
16	Greg Biffle	Roush Fenway Racing	Ford
17	Ricky Stenhouse Jr. (R)	Roush Fenway Racing	Ford
18	Kyle Busch	Joe Gibbs Racing	Toyota
19	Mike Bliss (i)	Humphrey Smith Racing	Toyota
20	Matt Kenseth	Joe Gibbs Racing	Toyota
21	Trevor Bayne (i)	Wood Brothers Racing	Ford
22	Joey Logano	Penske Racing	Ford
24	Jeff Gordon	Hendrick Motorsports	Chevrolet
27	Paul Menard	Richard Childress Racing	Chevrolet
29	Kevin Harvick	Richard Childress Racing	Chevrolet
30	David Stremme	Swan Racing	Toyota
31	Jeff Burton	Richard Childress Racing	Chevrolet
32	Timmy Hill (R)	FAS Lane Racing	Ford
33	Landon Cassill (i)	Circle Sport	Chevrolet
34	David Ragan	Front Row Motorsports	Ford
35	Josh Wise (i)	Front Row Motorsports	Ford
36	J. J. Yeley	Tommy Baldwin Racing	Chevrolet
38	David Gilliland	Front Row Motorsports	Ford
39	Ryan Newman	Stewart–Haas Racing	Chevrolet
42	Juan Pablo Montoya	Earnhardt Ganassi Racing	Chevrolet
43	Aric Almirola	Richard Petty Motorsports	Ford
47	Bobby Labonte	JTG Daugherty Racing	Toyota
48	Jimmie Johnson	Hendrick Motorsports	Chevrolet
51	Regan Smith (i)	Phoenix Racing	Chevrolet
55	Mark Martin	Michael Waltrip Racing	Toyota
56	Martin Truex Jr.	Michael Waltrip Racing	Toyota
78	Kurt Busch	Furniture Row Racing	Chevrolet
83	David Reutimann	BK Racing	Toyota
87	Joe Nemechek (i)	NEMCO-Jay Robinson Racing	Toyota
88	Dale Earnhardt Jr.	Hendrick Motorsports	Chevrolet
93	Travis Kvapil	BK Racing	Toyota
95	Scott Speed	Leavine Family Racing	Ford
98	Michael McDowell	Phil Parsons Racing	Ford
99	Carl Edwards	Roush Fenway Racing	Ford
Official entry list

=== Practice and qualifying ===
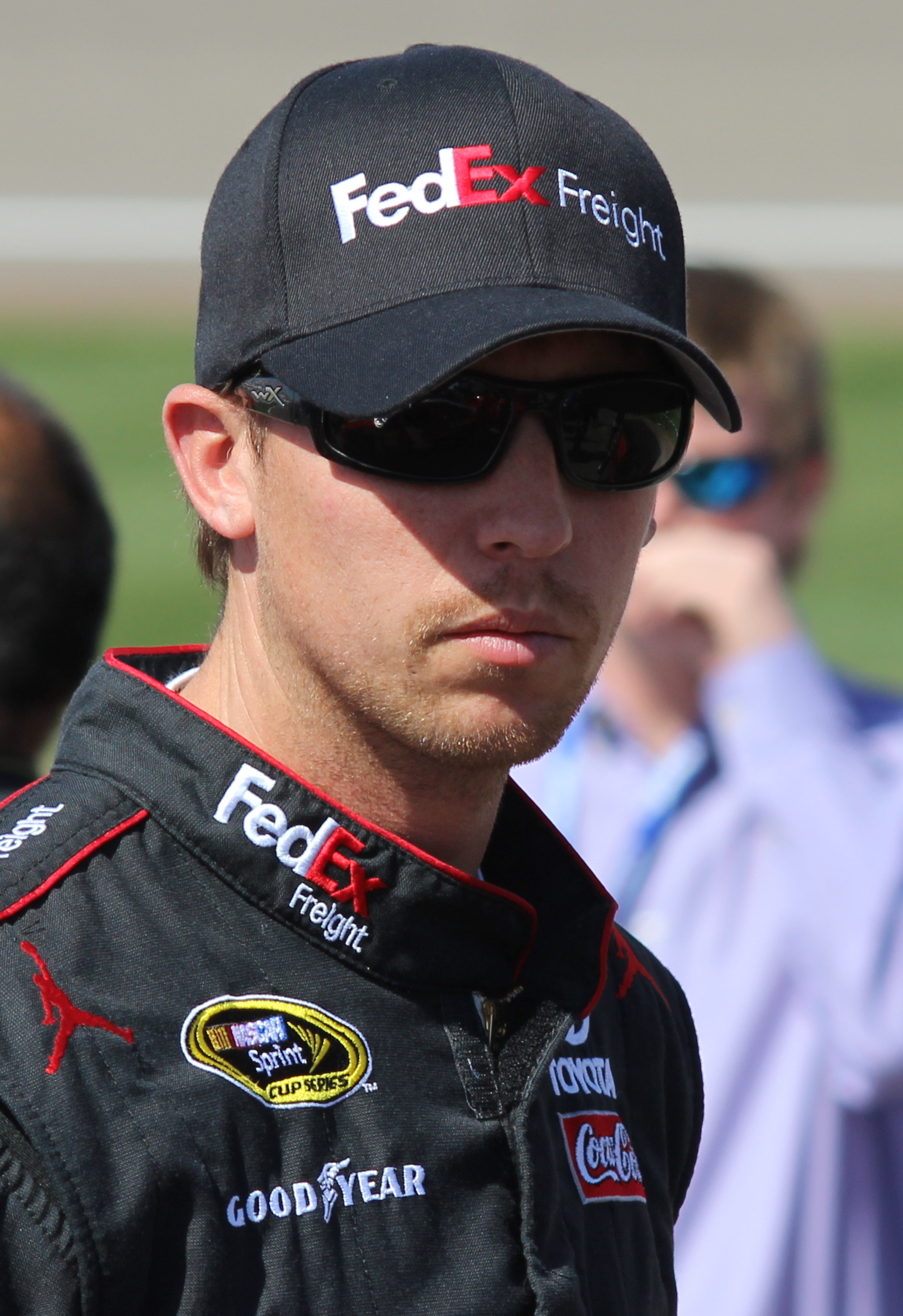
Denny Hamlin recorded the pole position, the fourteenth of his career.

Three practice sessions were held before the race. The first session, held on May 23, 2013, was 90 minutes long. The second and third, held on May 25, 2013, were 60 minutes long. During the first practice session, Kurt Busch was quickest with a time of 28.295, ahead of his brother Kyle and Kahne in second and third. Johnson followed in the fourth position, ahead of Almirola in fifth.

During qualifying, forty-four cars were entered, meaning only one car was bumped from the race because of NASCAR's qualifying procedure. Hamlin clinched his fourteenth career pole position, with a record-setting lap time of 27.604 seconds. After his qualifying run, Hamlin commented, "Proud to be back on the racetrack. We're really getting things going right now." He was joined on the front row of the grid by Darlington polesitter Kurt Busch. Kenseth qualified third, Mark Martin took fourth, and Kahne started fifth. Greg Biffle, Kyle Busch, Jamie McMurray, Ryan Newman, and Earnhardt Jr. completed the first ten positions on the grid. The driver who failed to qualify for the race was Mike Bliss.

In the Saturday morning session, Kahne was quickest, ahead of Kurt and Kyle Busch in second and third. Earnhardt Jr. and Johnson followed in the fourth and fifth positions. Biffle, Hamlin, Kenseth, Menard, and McMurray rounded out the first ten positions. In the final practice session for the race, Kahne remained quickest with a time of 28.633 seconds. Kurt Busch followed in second, ahead of Hamlin and Kenseth in third and fourth. Biffle, who was sixth quickest in second practice, managed fifth.

=== Race ===
As it was Memorial Day weekend, NASCAR's pre-race would pay tribute to American war veterans. After the invocation was delivered by Duck Dynasty's Willie Robertson, Grand Marshal Sergeant Aaron Causey, with his wife and United Service Organizations' Alan Reyes delivered the command to start engines. Denny Hamlin started on pole but was quickly passed for the lead by Matt Kenseth. Kasey Kahne took the lead on lap 24 and continued to lead through a round of green flag pit stops and until the first caution came out for debris on lap 68. Kahne continued to lead through pit stops and on the restart on lap 74 until Kyle Busch passed him on lap 75. Kahne retook the lead on lap 78 and quickly pulled away. Kahne continued to lead until the second caution on lap 112 for debris after Casey Mears hit the wall. Busch was first off of pit road and led on the restart on lap 119. The third caution came out on lap 122 when a cable that suspended a FOX Sports television camera over the frontstretch of the track snapped and fell on the track. Several cars ran over the cable, but only two sustained major damage: Kyle Busch, whose car had caused it to snap in the first place, and Marcos Ambrose. The red flag then came out on lap 126 as track officials cleaned up the cables. After a delay of 10 minutes and 40 seconds, NASCAR brought the cars down pit road and gave each team 15 minutes to look over their cars and do repairs if needed. Ten spectators were injured as a result of the cable failure. Busch continued to lead on the restart on lap 131 and led until green flag pit stops. When he made a pit stop on lap 177, Brad Keselowski and Danica Patrick each led one lap before the lead cycled back to Kenseth with Busch in 2nd on lap 179. Kenseth led until lap 222, when he made another green flag pit stop. Kenseth cycled out with a lead of over six seconds and had lapped all but 15 cars when the caution came out for debris on lap 241. Kenseth continued to lead on the restart (after pit stops). Kyle Busch's car started to slow and on lap 257, both his and Dale Earnhardt Jr.'s cars lost their engines. Earnhardt's car dropped oil on the track in turn three and Greg Biffle slipped in it, then hit the wall, along with Dave Blaney and Travis Kvapil. Another red flag waved as crews worked to clean up oil around the track. After everyone but Kenseth made pit stops, Kenseth led on the restart on lap 266

Nevertheless, Kenseth pulled away but was caught and passed by Kahne on lap 273. Kahne led until the sixth caution came out on lap 303 for debris in turn one. The caution trapped several drivers one lap down, most notably Kenseth, Jimmie Johnson (who got the free pass), and Jeff Gordon. Kahne led on the lap 309 restart, but the seventh caution quickly waved on lap 311 for debris once again. All the lead lap cars pitted, allowing Kenseth and Gordon to get back on the lead lap.

Kahne led at the lap 318 restart, as well as the lap 323 restart after Ricky Stenhouse Jr. got into Patrick and shot her up in front of Keselowski (putting them both in the wall). Kurt Busch took the lead after Kahne had a bad restart. The ninth caution quickly came out on lap 325 when Aric Almirola made in three-wide on the frontstretch with Mark Martin and Jeff Gordon. Martin backed out and barely clipped Almirola, sending him head-on into the wall right in front of Gordon. Six cars sustained damage from the crash: Almirola, Martin, Gordon, Stenhouse, Bobby Labonte, and Casey Mears. Another red flag waved as cars were removed from the track. Busch's car battery went dead, and, while it was being replaced, Kevin Harvick took the lead.

The restart came on lap 330 with Harvick leading, but the tenth caution waved on lap 332 as Johnson and Martin Truex Jr. traded paint. Johnson got loose and spun out. Kenseth, who was behind Johnson, slowed down to avoid him, but was hit from behind by Juan Pablo Montoya and Tony Stewart who couldn't slow up in time. Both Johnson and Montoya would fall several laps behind after multiple repairs and/or flat tires. Kenseth remained on the lead lap, but would later fall a couple laps down. Harvick led on the restart on lap 339 but was passed ten laps later by Kahne, who then pulled away. Kahne made a pit stop on lap 364, giving the lead to Harvick, who then pitted on lap 367. Ryan Newman took the lead on lap 368, but pitted and handed to lead to Stewart. Stewart made a pit stop on lap 374 and gave the lead to Carl Edwards, who then pitted himself on lap 381. Paul Menard led one lap before pitting and giving the lead back to Kahne.

The eleventh and final caution waved on lap 385 for debris on the frontstretch. Everyone pitted except for raceleader Kahne, and on the restart on lap 389, Harvick got by Kahne. Harvick pulled away from Kahne and third-place Kurt Busch over the last ten laps to pick up his 21st career win and his second Coca-Cola 600 in three years. Kahne finished second despite suffering from influenza, Kurt Busch finished third, while Denny Hamlin, and Joey Logano rounded out the top five.

== Results ==
=== Qualifying ===
Grid	No.	Driver	Team	Manufacturer	Time	Speed
1	11	Denny Hamlin	Joe Gibbs Racing	Toyota	27.604	195.624
2	78	Kurt Busch	Furniture Row Racing	Chevrolet	27.661	195.221
3	20	Matt Kenseth	Joe Gibbs Racing	Toyota	27.679	195.094
4	55	Mark Martin	Michael Waltrip Racing	Toyota	27.750	194.595
5	15	Clint Bowyer	Michael Waltrip Racing	Toyota	27.763	194.503
6	5	Kasey Kahne	Hendrick Motorsports	Chevrolet	27.785	194.349
7	16	Greg Biffle	Roush Fenway Racing	Ford	27.801	194.238
8	18	Kyle Busch	Joe Gibbs Racing	Toyota	27.842	193.952
9	1	Jamie McMurray	Earnhardt Ganassi Racing	Chevrolet	27.879	193.694
10	39	Ryan Newman	Stewart–Haas Racing	Chevrolet	27.887	193.639
11	88	Dale Earnhardt Jr.	Hendrick Motorsports	Chevrolet	27.915	193.444
12	48	Jimmie Johnson	Hendrick Motorsports	Chevrolet	27.937	193.292
13	99	Carl Edwards	Roush Fenway Racing	Ford	27.940	193.271
14	24	Jeff Gordon	Hendrick Motorsports	Chevrolet	27.985	192.961
15	29	Kevin Harvick	Richard Childress Racing	Chevrolet	28.049	192.520
16	42	Juan Pablo Montoya	Earnhardt Ganassi Racing	Chevrolet	28.083	192.287
17	56	Martin Truex Jr.	Michael Waltrip Racing	Toyota	28.097	192.191
18	43	Aric Almirola	Richard Petty Motorsports	Ford	28.106	192.130
19	9	Marcos Ambrose	Richard Petty Motorsports	Ford	28.107	192.123
20	2	Brad Keselowski	Penske Racing	Ford	28.142	191.884
21	13	Casey Mears	Germain Racing	Ford	28.142	191.884
22	27	Paul Menard	Richard Childress Racing	Chevrolet	28.165	191.727
23	36	J. J. Yeley	Tommy Baldwin Racing	Chevrolet	28.274	190.988
24	10	Danica Patrick	Stewart–Haas Racing	Chevrolet	28.298	190.826
25	14	Tony Stewart	Stewart–Haas Racing	Chevrolet	28.303	190.792
26	38	David Gilliland	Front Row Motorsports	Ford	28.322	190.665
27	31	Jeff Burton	Richard Childress Racing	Chevrolet	28.348	190.490
28	93	Travis Kvapil	BK Racing	Toyota	28.359	190.416
29	21	Trevor Bayne	Wood Brothers Racing	Ford	28.360	190.409
30	17	Ricky Stenhouse Jr.	Roush Fenway Racing	Ford	28.385	190.241
31	22	Joey Logano	Penske Racing	Ford	28.414	190.047
32	98	Michael McDowell	Phil Parsons Racing	Ford	28.426	189.967
33	7	Dave Blaney	Tommy Baldwin Racing	Chevrolet	28.452	189.793
34	47	Bobby Labonte	JTG Daugherty Racing	Toyota	28.511	189.401
35	34	David Ragan	Front Row Motorsports	Ford	28.564	189.049
36	51	Regan Smith	Phoenix Racing	Chevrolet	28.613	188.725
37	83	David Reutimann	BK Racing	Toyota	28.665	188.383
38	30	David Stremme	Swan Racing	Toyota	28.683	188.265
39	32	Timmy Hill	FAS Lane Racing	Ford	28.706	188.114
40	87	Joe Nemechek	NEMCO-Jay Robinson Racing	Toyota	28.711	188.081
41	33	Landon Cassill	Circle Sport	Chevrolet	28.712	188.075
42	35	Josh Wise	Front Row Motorsports	Ford	28.969	186.406
43	95	Scott Speed	Leavine Family Racing	Ford	28.623	188.659
Failed to Qualify
	19	Mike Bliss	Humphrey Smith Motorsports	Toyota	28.690	188.219

=== Race results ===
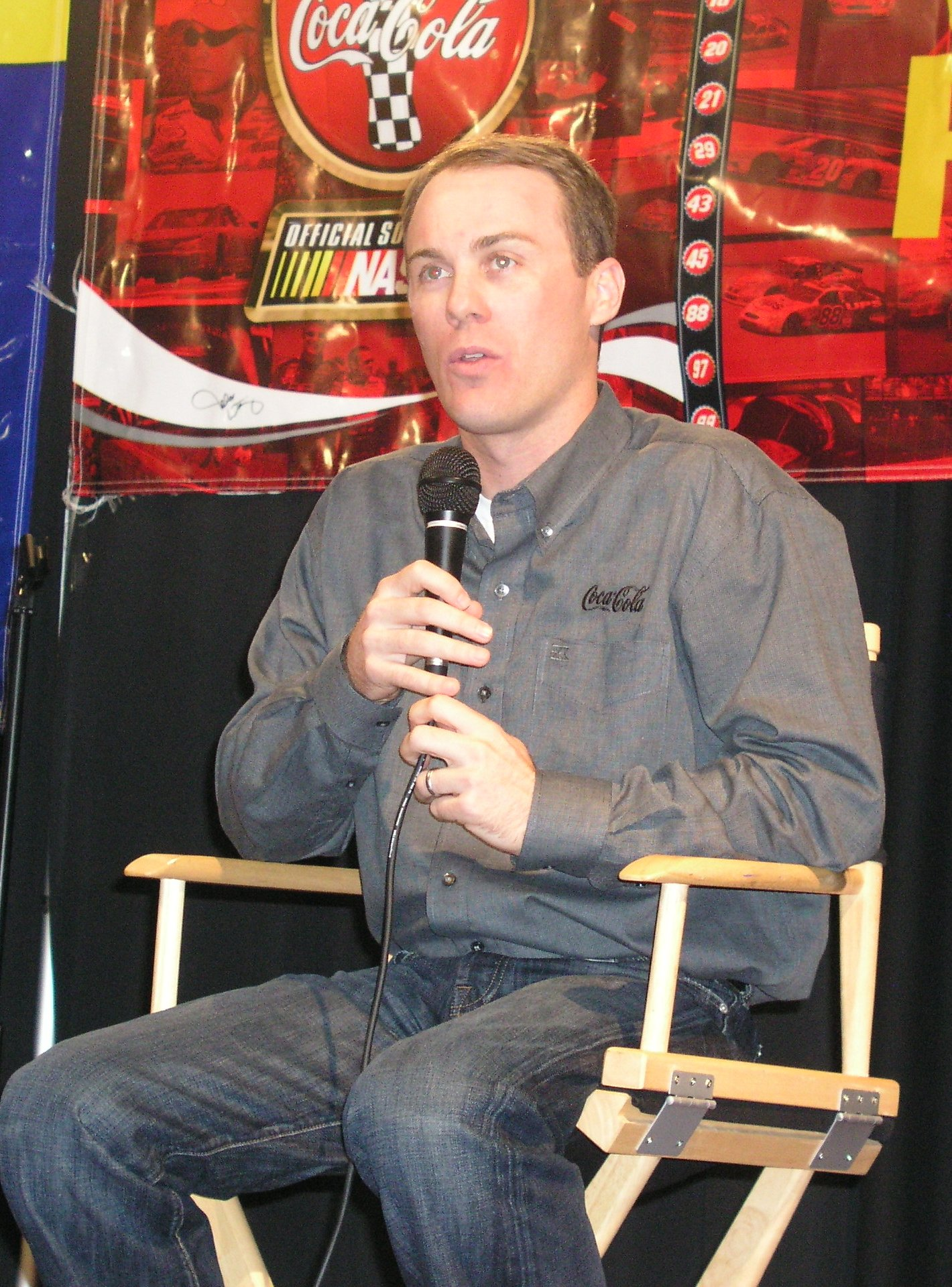
Kevin Harvick won the race, his second win of the season.

Pos	Grid	Car	Driver	Team	Manufacturer	Laps	Led	Points^{1}
1	15	29	Kevin Harvick	Richard Childress Racing	Chevrolet	400	28	47
2	6	5	Kasey Kahne	Hendrick Motorsports	Chevrolet	400	161	44
3	2	78	Kurt Busch	Furniture Row Racing	Chevrolet	400	8	42
4	1	11	Denny Hamlin	Joe Gibbs Racing	Toyota	400	6	41
5	31	22	Joey Logano	Penske Racing	Ford	400	0	39
6	10	39	Ryan Newman	Stewart–Haas Racing	Chevrolet	400	1	39
7	25	14	Tony Stewart	Stewart–Haas Racing	Chevrolet	400	6	38
8	5	15	Clint Bowyer	Michael Waltrip Racing	Toyota	400	0	36
9	17	56	Martin Truex Jr.	Michael Waltrip Racing	Toyota	400	0	35
10	19	9	Marcos Ambrose	Richard Petty Motorsports	Ford	400	0	34
11	13	99	Carl Edwards	Roush Fenway Racing	Ford	400	7	34
12	27	31	Jeff Burton	Richard Childress Racing	Chevrolet	400	0	32
13	22	27	Paul Menard	Richard Childress Racing	Chevrolet	400	1	32
14	30	17	Ricky Stenhouse Jr.	Roush Fenway Racing	Ford	398	0	30
15	3	20	Matt Kenseth	Joe Gibbs Racing	Toyota	398	112	30
16	29	21	Trevor Bayne	Wood Brothers Racing	Ford	397	0	–
17	36	51	Regan Smith	Phoenix Racing	Chevrolet	397	0	–
18	16	42	Juan Pablo Montoya	Earnhardt Ganassi Racing	Chevrolet	397	0	26
19	9	1	Jamie McMurray	Earnhardt Ganassi Racing	Chevrolet	396	2	26
20	26	38	David Gilliland	Front Row Motorsports	Ford	396	0	24
21	38	83	David Reutimann	BK Racing	Toyota	396	0	23
22	12	48	Jimmie Johnson	Hendrick Motorsports	Chevrolet	395	0	22
23	21	13	Casey Mears	Germain Racing	Ford	394	0	21
24	34	47	Bobby Labonte	JTG Daugherty Racing	Toyota	394	0	20
25	35	34	David Ragan	Front Row Motorsports	Ford	394	0	19
26	43	35	Josh Wise	Front Row Motorsports	Ford	393	0	–
27	40	32	Timmy Hill	FAS Lane Racing	Ford	391	0	17
28	23	36	J. J. Yeley	Tommy Baldwin Racing	Chevrolet	390	0	16
29	24	10	Danica Patrick	Stewart–Haas Racing	Chevrolet	385	0	15
30	33	7	Dave Blaney	Tommy Baldwin Racing	Chevrolet	339	0	14
31	7	16	Greg Biffle	Roush Fenway Racing	Ford	335	0	13
32	39	30	David Stremme	Swan Racing	Toyota	326	0	12
33	18	43	Aric Almirola	Richard Petty Motorsports	Ford	324	0	11
34	4	55	Mark Martin	Michael Waltrip Racing	Toyota	324	0	10
35	14	24	Jeff Gordon	Hendrick Motorsports	Chevrolet	324	0	9
36	20	2	Brad Keselowski	Penske Racing	Ford	317	3	9
37	42	33	Landon Cassill	Circle Sport	Chevrolet	303	0	–
38	8	18	Kyle Busch	Joe Gibbs Racing	Toyota	257	65	7
39	11	88	Dale Earnhardt Jr.	Hendrick Motorsports	Chevrolet	256	0	5
40	28	93	Travis Kvapil	BK Racing	Toyota	253	0	4
41	41	87	Joe Nemechek	NEMCO-Jay Robinson Racing	Toyota	213	0	–
42	32	98	Michael McDowell	Phil Parsons Racing	Ford	50	0	2
43	37	95	Scott Speed	Leavine Family Racing	Ford	39	0	1

Notes

^1 Points include 3 Chase for the Sprint Cup points for winning, 1 point for leading a lap, and 1 point for most laps led.

== Standings after the race ==
Drivers' Championship standings

	Pos	Driver	Points
	1	Jimmie Johnson	445
	2	Carl Edwards	413 (–32)
	3	Matt Kenseth	394 (–51)
1	4	Clint Bowyer	385 (–60)
1	5	Kasey Kahne	370 (–75)

Manufacturers' Championship standings

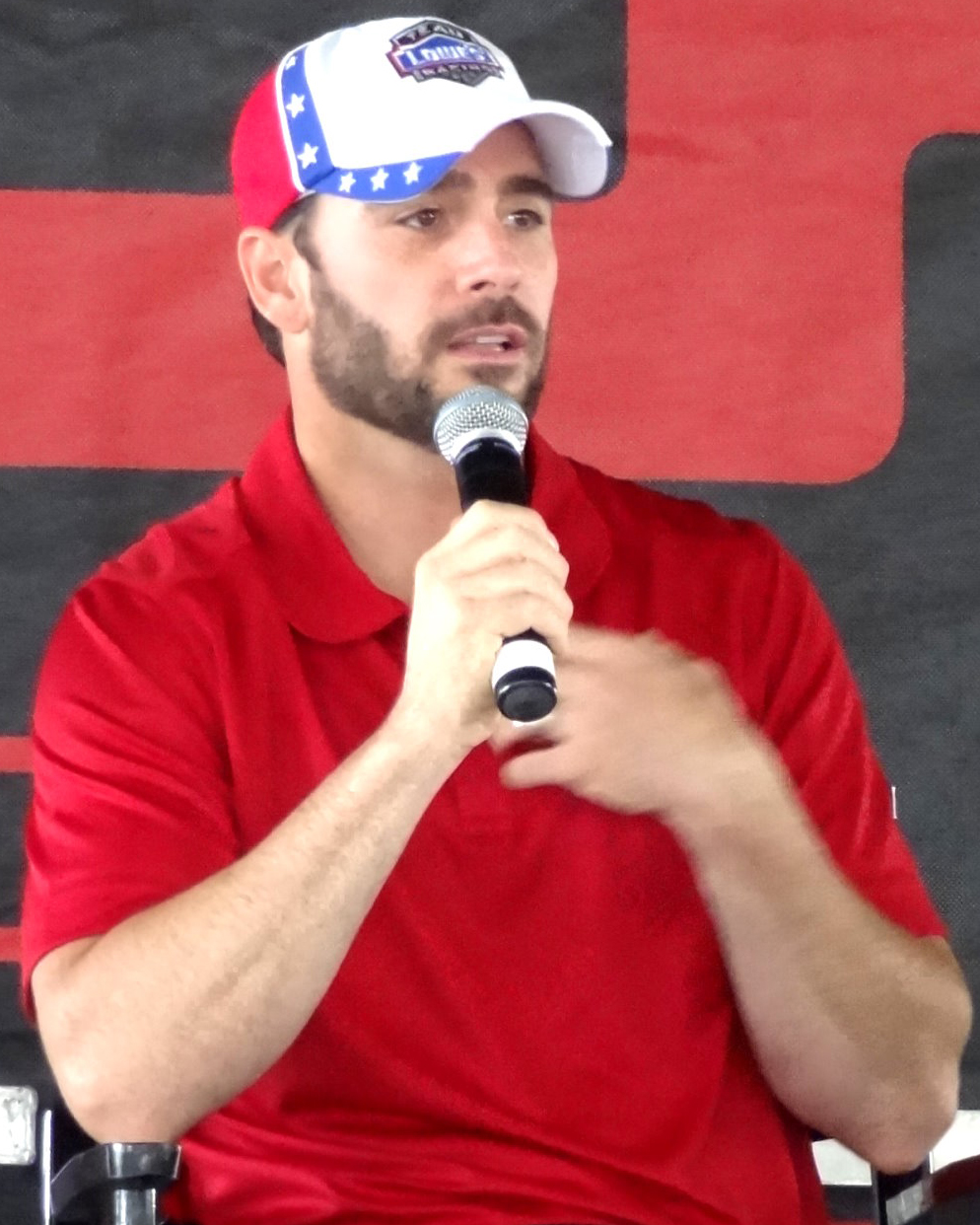
Jimmie Johnson remained the Driver's Championship leader, despite finishing 22nd.

Pos	Manufacturer	Points
1	Chevrolet	83
2	Toyota	78 (–5)
3	Ford	60 (–13)

- Note: Only the first twelve positions are included for the driver standings.

Previous race: 2013 Bojangles' Southern 500	Sprint Cup Series; 2013 season	Next race: 2013 FedEx 400
