= Crane shot =

Cinematic shot taken with a camera mounted on a moving crane

Crane camera in action at Götaplatsen, Gothenburg, Sweden, during MTV World Stage 2012.

In filmmaking and video production, a crane shot is a shot taken by a camera on a moving crane or jib. Filmmaker D. W. Griffith created the first crane for his 1916 epic film Intolerance, with famed special effects pioneer Eiji Tsuburaya later constructing the first iron camera crane which is still adapted worldwide today. Most cranes accommodate both the camera and an operator, but some can be moved by remote control. Crane shots are often found in what are supposed to be emotional or suspenseful scenes. One example of this technique is the shots taken by remote cranes in the car-chase sequence of the 1985 film To Live and Die in L.A. Some filmmakers place the camera on a boom arm simply to make it easier to move around between ordinary set-ups. In many applications, Drones are used instead of a crane.

== History ==
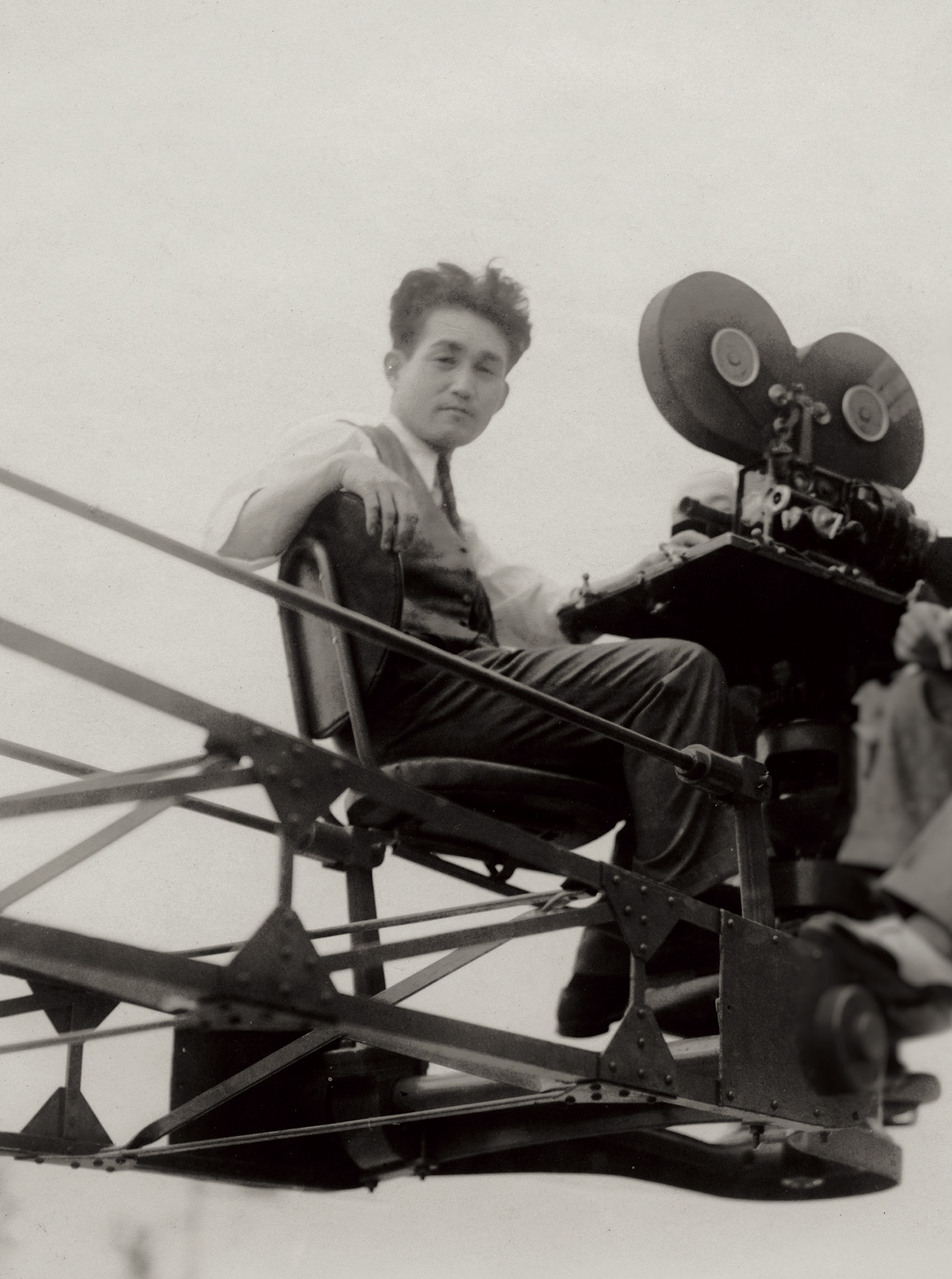
Godzilla co-creator Eiji Tsuburaya riding the first iron shooting crane in 1934. An adaptation of this crane is still used worldwide today.

D. W. Griffith designed the first camera crane for his 1916 epic film Intolerance. His crane measured 140 feet tall and ascended on six four-wheeled railroad trucks. In 1929, future special effects pioneer Eiji Tsuburaya constructed a smaller replica of Griffith's wooden camera crane without blueprints or manuals. Although his wooden crane collapsed shortly after its completion, Tsuburaya created the first-ever iron shooting crane in October 1934, and an adaptation of this crane is still used worldwide today. Many uses of camera cranes have been replaced by aerial drones, due to lower cost.

== Camera crane types ==
Camera cranes may be small, medium, or large, depending on the load capacity and length of the loading arm. Historically, the first camera crane provided for lifting the camera together with the operator, and sometimes an assistant. The range of motion of the boom was restricted because of the high load capacity and the need to ensure operator safety. In recent years a camera crane boom tripod with a remote control has become popular. It carries on the boom only a movie or television camera without an operator and allows shooting from difficult positions as a small load capacity makes it possible to achieve a long reach of the crane boom and relative freedom of movement. The operator controls the camera from the ground through a motorized panoramic head, using remote control and video surveillance by watching the image on the monitor. A separate category consists of telescopic camera cranes. These devices allow setting an arbitrary trajectory of the camera, eliminating the characteristic jib crane radial displacement that comes with traditional spanning shots.

Large camera cranes are almost indistinguishable from the usual boom-type cranes, with the exception of special equipment for smoothly moving the boom and controlling noise. Small camera cranes and crane-trucks have a lightweight construction, often without a mechanical drive. The valves are controlled manually by balancing the load-specific counterweight, facilitating manipulation. To improve usability and repeatability of movement of the crane in different takes, the axis of rotation arrows are provided with limbs and a pointer. In some cases, the camera crane is mounted on a dolly for even greater camera mobility. Such devices are called crane trolleys. In modern films robotic cranes allow use of multiple actuators for high-accuracy repeated movement of the camera in trick photography. These devices are called tap-robots; some sources use the term motion control.

== Manufacturers ==
The major supplier of cranes in the cinema of the United States throughout the 1940s, 1950s, and 1960s was the Chapman Company (later Chapman-Leonard of North Hollywood), supplanted by dozens of similar manufacturers around the world. The traditional design provided seats for both the director and the camera operator, and sometimes a third seat for the cinematographer as well. Large weights on the back of the crane compensate for the weight of the people riding the crane and must be adjusted carefully to avoid the possibility of accidents. During the 1960s, the tallest crane was the Chapman Titan crane, a massive design over 20 feet high that won an Academy Scientific & Engineering award.

During the last few years, camera cranes have been miniaturized and costs have dropped so dramatically that most aspiring film makers have access to these tools. What was once a "Hollywood" effect is now available for under $400. Manufacturers of camera cranes include ABC-Products, Cambo, Filmotechnic, Polecam, Panther and Matthews Studio Equipment, Sevenoak, and Newton Nordic.

== Camera crane technique ==
Most such cranes were manually operated, requiring an experienced boom operator who knew how to vertically raise, lower, and "crab" the camera alongside actors while the crane platform rolled on separate tracks. The crane operator and camera operator had to precisely coordinate their moves so that focus, pan, and camera position all started and stopped at the same time, requiring great skill and rehearsal. On the back of the crane is a counter weight. This allows the crane to smooth action while in motion with minimal effort.

== Notable usage ==
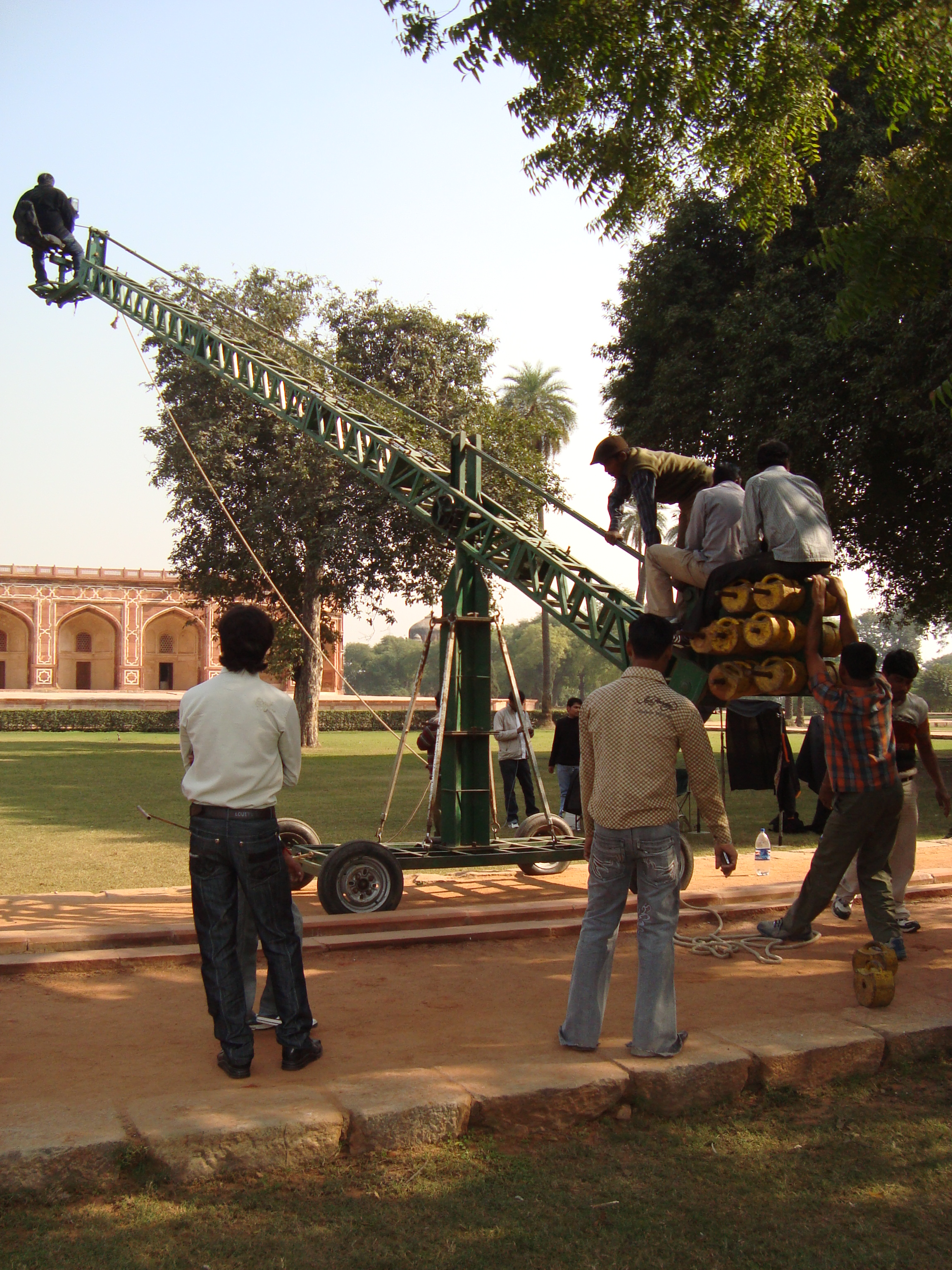
Shooting from a manual crane

- D. W. Griffith's Intolerance (1916) featured the first ever crane shot for a film.
- Atsuo Tomioka's 1935 film The Chorus of a Million featured the first iron camera crane, which was created and employed in the film in 1934 by Eiji Tsuburaya.
- Leni Riefenstahl had a cameraman shoot a half-circle pan shot from a crane for the 1935 Nazi propaganda film Triumph of the Will.
- A crane shot was used in Orson Welles' 1941 film Citizen Kane. Welles also used a crane camera during the iconic opening of Touch of Evil (1958). The camera perched on a Chapman crane begins on a close-up of a ticking time bomb and ends three-plus minutes later with a blinding explosion.
- The Western High Noon (1952) had a famous crane shot. The shot backs up and rises, in order to show Marshal Will Kane totally alone and isolated on the street.
- The 1964 film by Mikhail Kalatozov, I Am Cuba contains two of the most astonishing tracking shots ever attempted.
- In his film Sympathy for the Devil, Jean-Luc Godard used a crane for almost every shot in the movie, giving each scene a 360-degree tour of the tableau Godard presented to the viewer. In the final scene, he even shows the crane he was able to rent on his limited budget by including it in the scene. This was one of his traits as a filmmaker — showing off his budget — as he did with Brigitte Bardot in Le Mepris (Contempt).
- The closing take of Richard Attenborough's film version of Oh! What a Lovely War begins with a single war grave, gradually pulling back to reveal hundreds of identical crosses.
- The 1980 comedy-drama film The Stunt Man featured a crane throughout the production of the fictitious film-within-a-film (with the director played by Peter O'Toole).
- The television comedy Second City Television (SCTV) uses the concept of the crane shot as comedic material. After using a crane shot in one of the first NBC-produced episodes, the network complained about the exorbitant cost of renting the crane. SCTV writers responded by making the "crane shot" a ubiquitous symbol of production excess while also lampooning network executives who care nothing about artistic vision and everything about the bottom line. At the end of the second season, an inebriated Johnny LaRue (John Candy) is given his very own crane by Santa Claus, implying he would be able to have a crane shot whenever he wanted it.
- Director Dario Argento included an extensive scene in Tenebrae where the camera seemingly crawled over the walls and up a house wall, all in one seamless take. Due to its length, the tracking shot ended up being the production's most difficult and complex part to complete.
- The 2004 Johnnie To film Breaking News opens with an elaborate seven-minute single-take crane shot.
- Director Dennis Dugan frequently uses top-to-bottom crane shots in his comedy films.
- A camera crane panoramic master interior live shot opens The Late Late Show with James Corden after the pre-recorded exterior aerial-shot.
- Jeopardy! uses a crane to pan the camera over the audience.

== See also ==
- Technocrane, a telescopic camera crane
- U-crane, a gyro-stabilized car-mounted telescopic camera crane
