= Tripod head =

Part of a tripod system

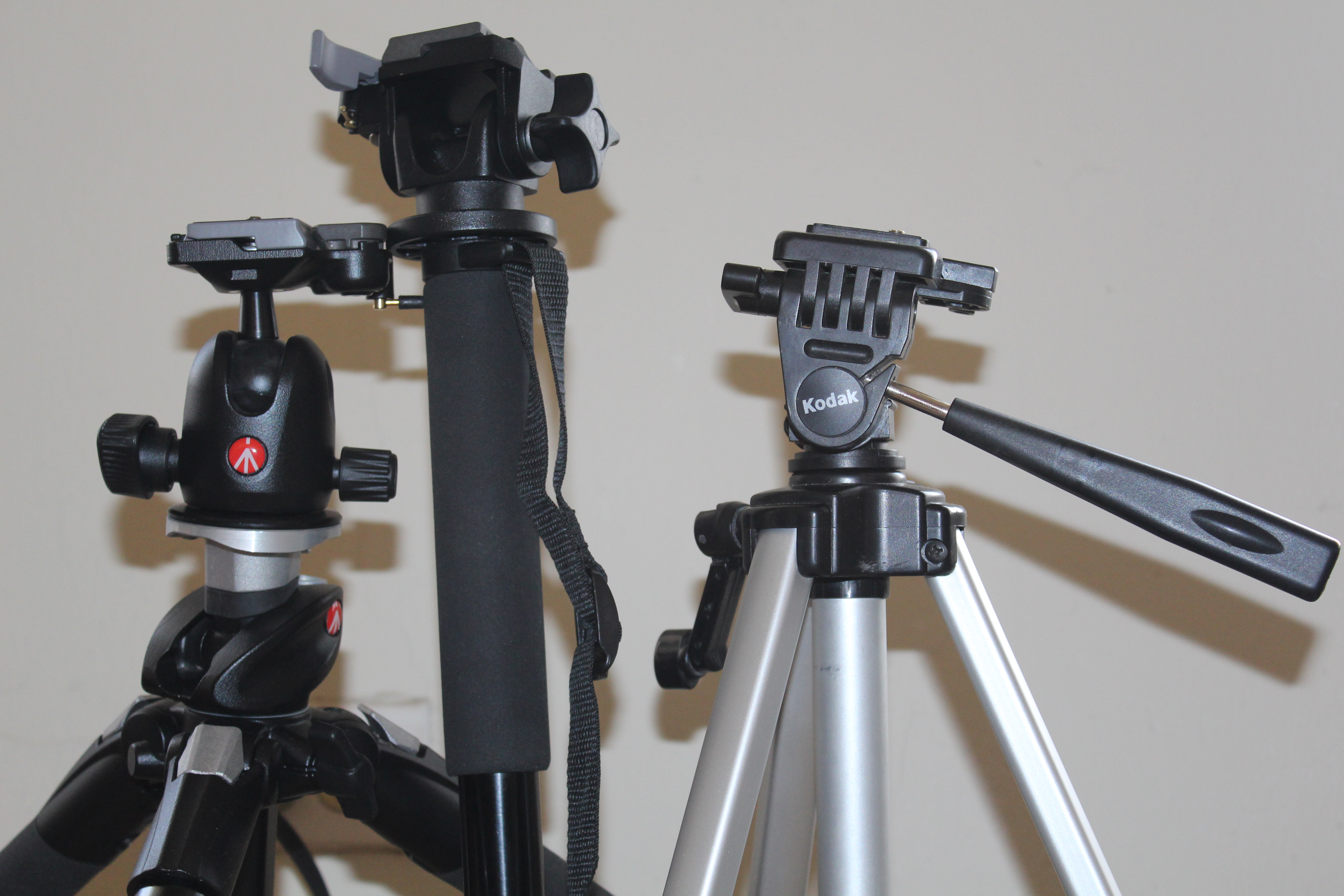
Left-to-right: Ball head, one-way tilt head and three-way tilt head

A tripod head is the part of a tripod system that attaches the supported device (such as a camera) to the tripod legs, and allows the orientation of the device to be manipulated or locked down. Modular or stand-alone tripod heads can be used on a wide range of tripods, allowing the user to choose which type of head best suits their needs. Integrated heads are built directly onto the tripod legs, reducing the cost of the tripod system.

The main function of any tripod head is to provide the ability to hold the attached device fixed in a specific orientation until the user needs to change its position. In the case of a photographic camera, this can help reduce vibration that would appear when using relatively slow shutter speeds while still being able to quickly recompose for another shot, or allow for very long exposures. In cinematography or video applications, a tripod head allows the camera operator to pan and tilt with much more control when compared to hand-holding the camera.

The various types of tripod heads available provide different control mechanisms and have distinct applications. Some can restrict movement to a single axis, while others offer robotic movement to increase the precision of the movements. The materials used to construct tripod heads and the physical designs of various heads can be drastically different, depending on their intended use.

In some situations a tripod head may be used without a set of tripod legs. Heads can be attached to monopods to provide more versatility, or to a simple plate with a base mount for when the height of a full tripod is unnecessary.

== Base mounts ==
The base mount is the connection between the tripod head and the tripod legs. Often the head will have a fairly large, flat base that sits on top of the tripod, and uses cork or rubber to increase the friction between the two, to prevent the head from unscrewing during use. The actual connection between the two is often made with a screw. A common standard for base mounts on photographic tripod equipment is a 3/8-16 screw (a screw that is 3/8 inches in diameter, with 16 threads per inch) on the tripod legs, and a matching receptacle on the tripod head. In the case of tripods with integrated heads, there will be no distinct base mount, with the top of the tripod legs and the bottom of the tripod head being a single part or non-removable assembly.

In some situations, a camera may be connected directly to the base mount. This is more common with monopods, where a separate head may not be necessary. In these cases, and for times when a smaller tripod head is being connected to the legs, the connection is often made using a 1/4-20 screw, rather than a 3/8-16 screw.

== Head mounts ==
The point where the tripod head and the device attach is called the head mount. Most camera equipment includes a built-in female 1/4-20 receptacle, so the majority of tripod heads utilize a male 1/4-20 screw as their head mounts. Many consumer level tripod heads use the bare head mount to attach the camera, but higher end models often include a camera mounting system that is pre-attached to the head mount.

== Camera mount ==
Camera mounting systems are used to make attaching and detaching devices to the tripod quicker and easier. Many mounting systems are called "quick-release" systems, and utilize a two-piece mechanism. One piece is a plate that is affixed to the underside of the device, and the other piece is a receiver (normally mounted to the tripod head's head mount) that is specifically designed to hold the plate. This is often achieved with a groove or a taper on the plate, and a locking release on the receiver that allows for quick removal of the device.

=== Arca-Swiss style ===
Cross-section of an Arca-Swiss style quick release plate

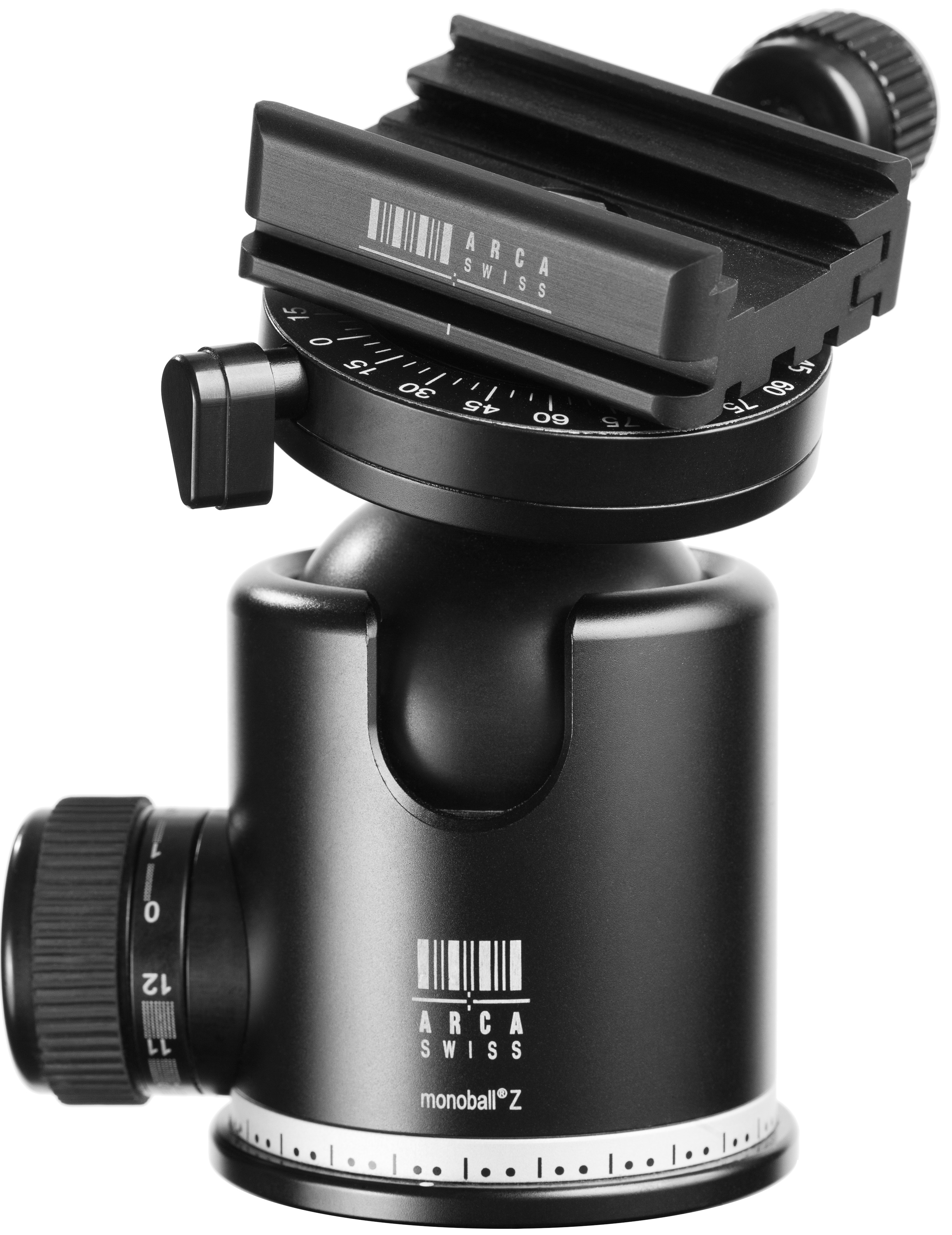
Arca-Swiss Monoball Z1 dp (Double Pan) tripod head

Swiss camera equipment maker Arca-Swiss Phototechnik AG independently developed a quick-release mounting system for their tripod heads. The system is based on 38 mm wide mounting plates with a 45° dovetail rail on the sides, which is clamped into place on the tripod head receiver with a screw-fastened grabber plate. Starting in the 1990s, with the popularization of the Arca-Swiss B-1 ballhead, many other companies began producing plates and including Arca-Swiss style (sometimes referred to as Arca-type) receivers on their tripod heads. Many other manufacturers now utilize this system, including Acratech, FEISOL, Giotto's, Kirk Photo, Really Right Stuff, Wimberley and others. Today most plates are machined aluminum which are attached to the cameras or lenses with a 1/4-20 hex screw.

Another aspect of the Arca-Swiss system is that the mounting plates are designed to prevent accidental rotation of the plate relative to the device. When used with a camera or camera body the plates incorporate an anti-rotation flange or lip. When mounted to a lens with a foot, the plate will often be secured with two screws to prevent rotation. When this type of system is used, the camera cannot become accidentally detached from the tripod, which is possible when using a quick-release system that doesn't prevent rotation, or when no camera mount is used.

Nearly all makes and models of modern SLRs, medium format cameras, and large lenses have specific plates available with anti-rotation flanges. There are plates available for certain models of other formats of cameras, such as point and shoots, as well. Universal mounting plates are also available, which can be used with nearly any camera with a tripod mount, though they provide little or no anti-rotation protection.

Some plates and receivers implement further failsafes. In the event that the receiver clamp is loosened slightly, it is possible the plate would be able to slide out of the receiver completely. To prevent this, grooves are added to the receiver and small protrusions (stops) are added to the plate (often in the form of small screws, so that they are removable). Even if the clamp should loosen, the stops would limit the movement of the plate to only within the grooves, preventing a complete disconnect, and often equipment damage.

Even though Arca-type systems from various vendors are similar, variations do create some incompatibilities. The width of the mounting plates, as well as the depth and angle of the dovetails, can introduce such incompatibilities when mixing components from different brands. While the traditional screw clamp used to hold plates can accommodate various plate widths, some clamps use a lever-release, which has much lower tolerances. Often the lever-release clamps are only guaranteed to be compatible with plates from the same brand, though they are still considered to be arca-type, and often are compatible with other plates.

In addition to its use in photography, the Arca-type dovetail rail has also become popular in shooting competitions such as the Precision Rifle Series for attaching auxiliary equipment such as bipods, tripods, etc. An advantage of the ARCA rail over traditional firearm mounts (such as the Picatinny rail) is that the ARCA rail allows for stepless sliding adjustment.

== Types of tripod heads ==
=== Photography ===
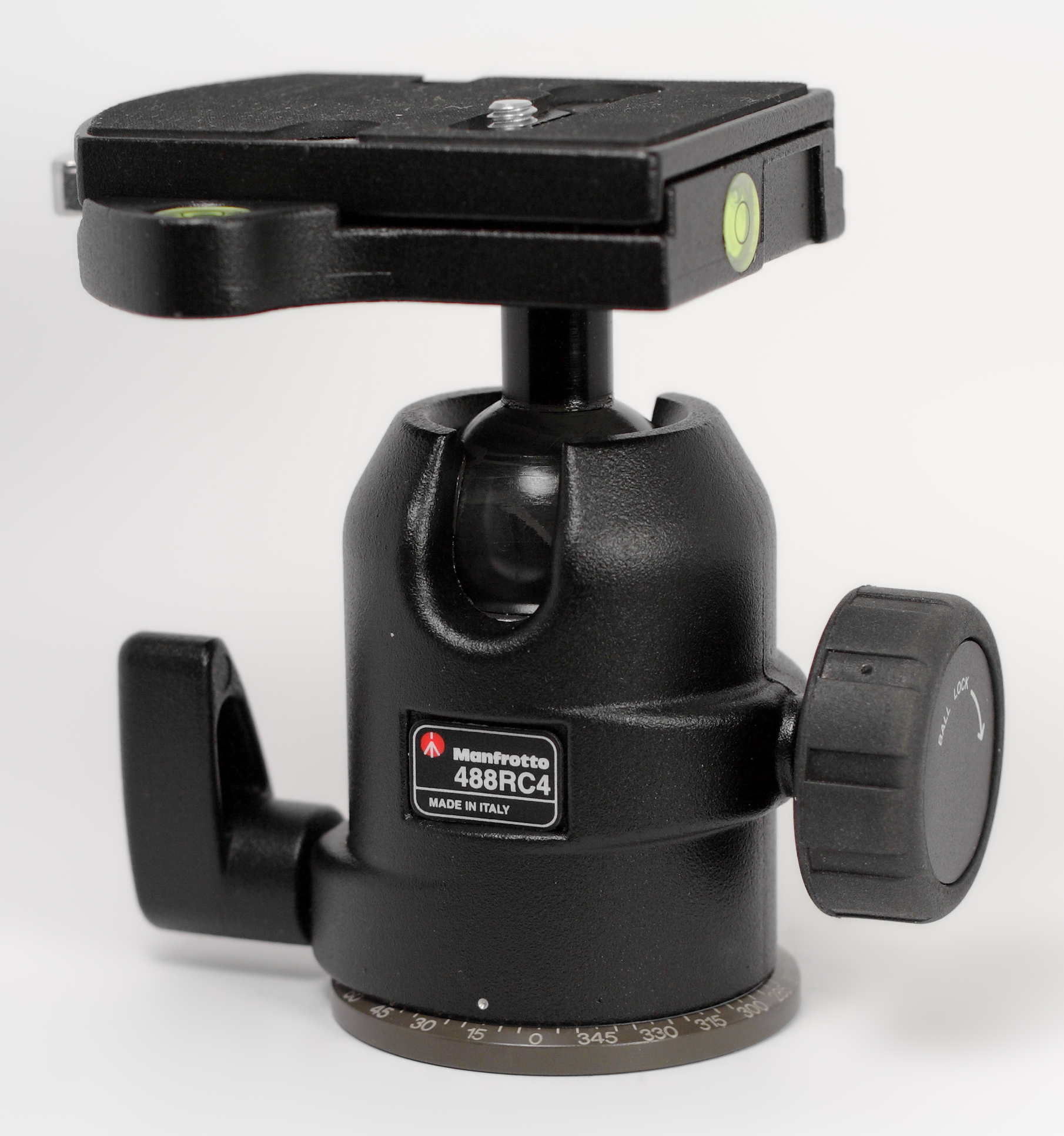
A ball head, showing panoramic rotation lock lever, and ball lock knob.

==== Ballheads ====
A ballhead uses a ball and socket type joint for orientation control. The ball sits in a socket, which can be tightened to lock the ball in place. A stem extends from the ball which terminates at the head mount. They tend to have fewer parts than other types of tripod heads due to their simple mechanism, but the parts must be precisely machined to fit well together and provide smooth movement, increasing their average price. Ballheads offer the convenience of simple controls, but are lacking in terms of precise movements, making specific alignment and image positioning a challenge.

The most basic ballheads offer a single control, a tension control, which is used to tighten or loosen the joint and prevent or allow movement of the attached device. Higher end heads may offer additional controls. Some have independent panning control, which allow the entire joint mechanism to be rotated horizontally 360°, while maintaining the orientation of the ball joint. Other ballheads include an additional control on the joint, called a drag control. This allows the user to set a secondary tension level on the ball, based on the current load, to hold the attached device in place when the tension control is disengaged, while still allowing explicit movements.

==== Pan heads ====
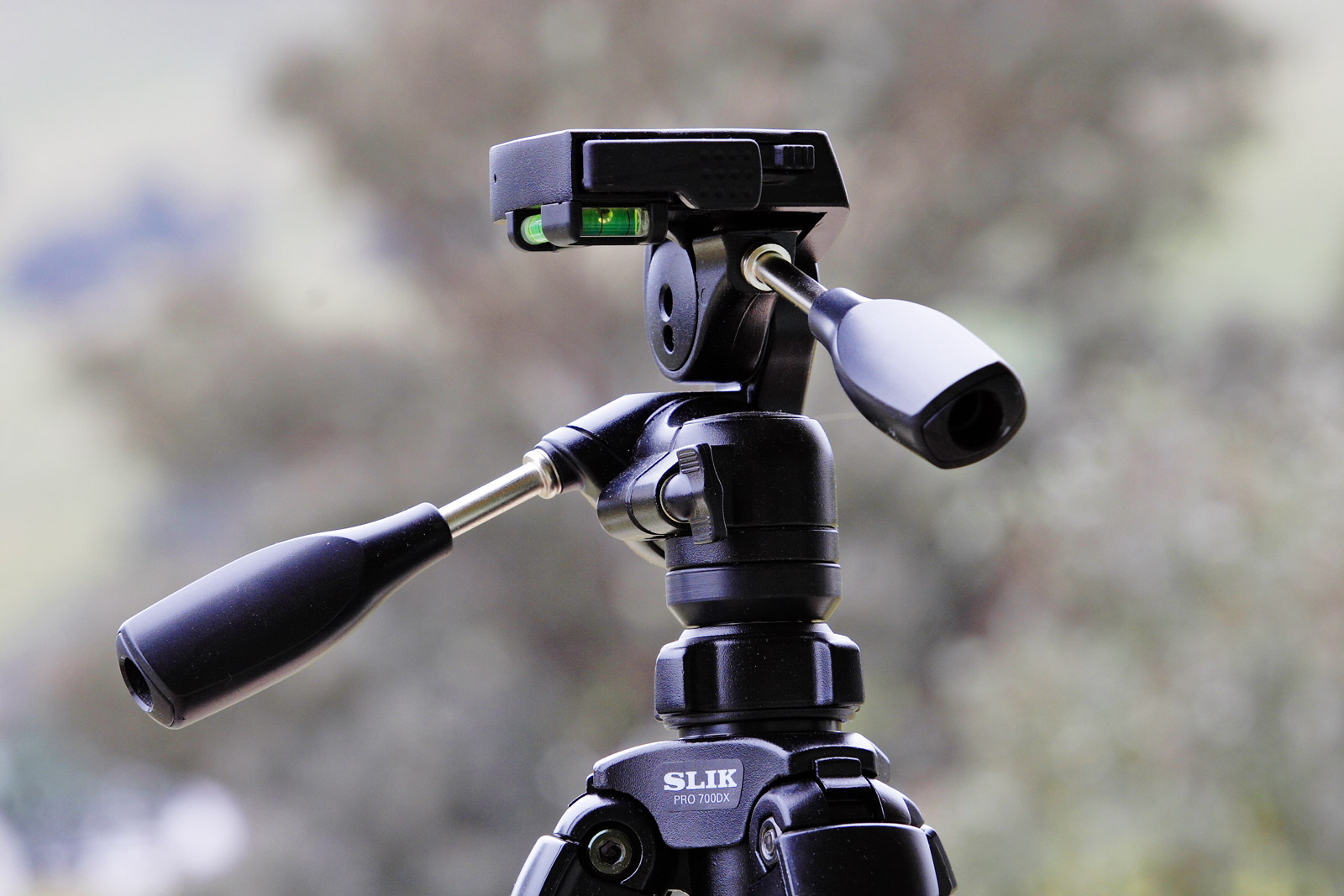
A 3-way pan-tilt head on a tripod, showing panoramic rotation, lateral tilt, and front tilt controls

A pan head, also called pan and tilt head, allows independent rotation of the camera about two or three perpendicular axes, which normally do not intersect. Typical pan heads have lockable levers for each axis, a scale marked in degrees at least for the vertical axis, and one or more spirit levels. This construction is significantly more complicated than that of a ball head.

Pan heads can be used for panoramas, but suffer from the deficiency that the axes of rotation normally do not go through the entrance pupil of the lens and thus can give rise to problems with parallax. A better choice for panoramas is a custom-built panoramic tripod head.

Some specialist pan heads, such as the Induro PHQ series, offer up to five axes of rotation, two of them in parallel with the other axes.

==== Geared heads ====
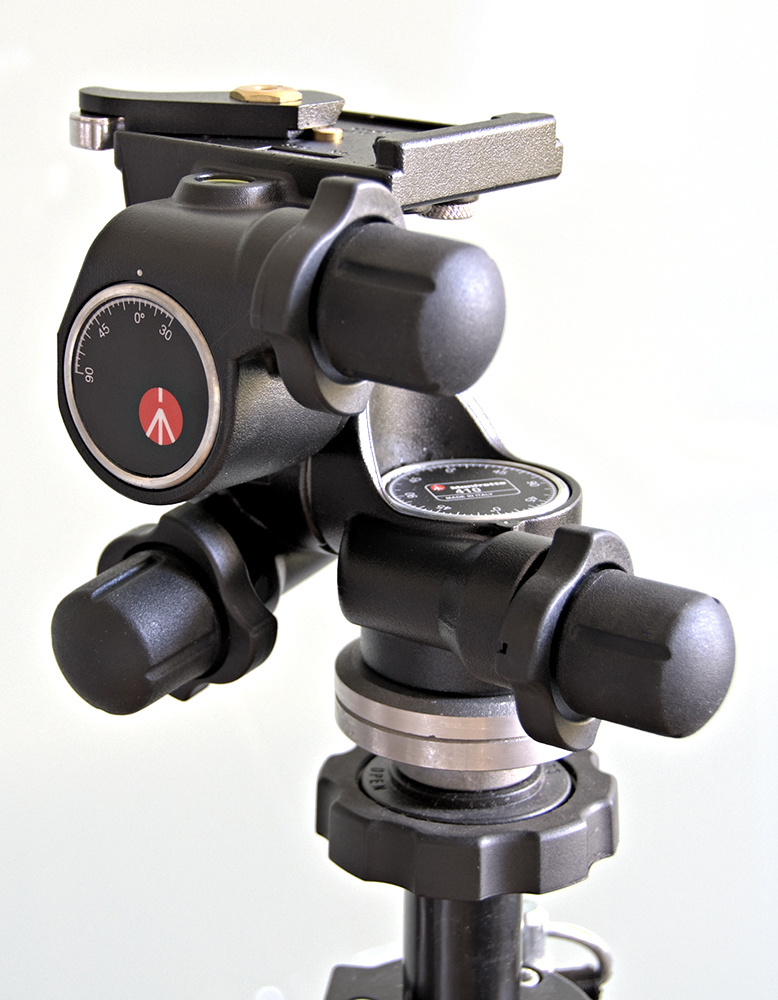
Manfrotto Geared Tripod Head 410 Junior

A geared head takes a pan and tilt head and adds gears to each of the axes. They typically have a release on each axis to allow for rough positioning the camera, and geared controls then allow small adjustments to finesse composition. They are typically heavier than ball or pan heads due to the weight of the mechanisms.

==== Panoramic heads ====
Panoramic heads facilitate taking a number of images that will be stitched together to make a single panoramic image. The most important function is to rotate the camera around the entrance pupil of the lens, frequently (but inaccurately) called the nodal point. Commercially available heads are categorized as "single-row heads" and "multi-row heads". Single row heads rotate round a single vertical axis and typically require the lens axis to be positioned horizontally. Multi-row heads allow rotation about two axes.

==== Gimbal heads ====
Gimbal heads are designed mainly for long, heavy telephoto lenses, and are often used for wildlife or sports photography. Their primary feature is the ability to balance the camera and lens within the tripod head and use tension controls to simulate a "weightlessness". The camera can be moved freely, the tension system smoothing the movement and reducing camera shake, and is held still in place when not being moved. They allow for easy tracking along the vertical and horizontal axis, but generally do not offer the ability to make precise angular movements along either. A gimbal head excels at tracking a fast moving subject, and allowing large, cumbersome camera setups to be used with more agility than nearly any other support system.

=== Video and film ===
==== Fluid heads ====
Fluid heads are the dominant tripod heads used in the motion picture industry. They provide extremely smooth free movement, even with the heaviest of filmmaking and professional video cameras. The fluid reduces the risk of the camera operator introducing any jerkiness or vibration to the shot during a pan or tilt through dampening, and also reduces the friction between moving parts of the head. As the size of high-quality video cameras has become greatly reduced, there are now fluid heads designed even for consumer camcorders, which are being used increasingly in television production environments.

==== Camera crane ====
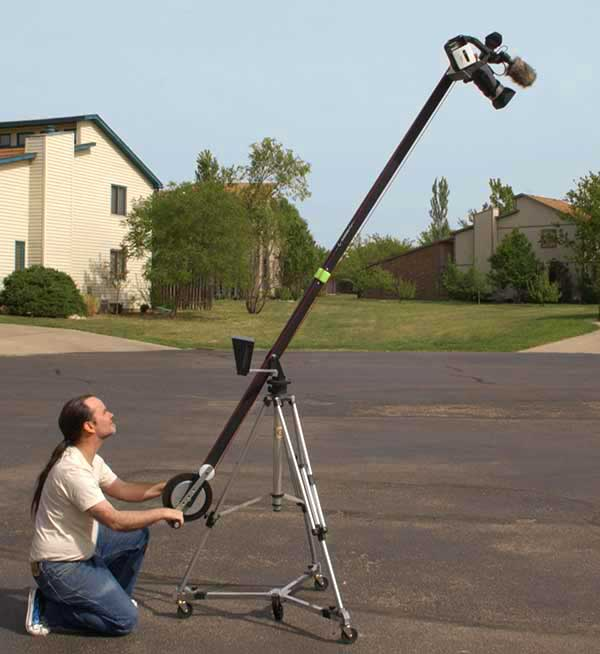
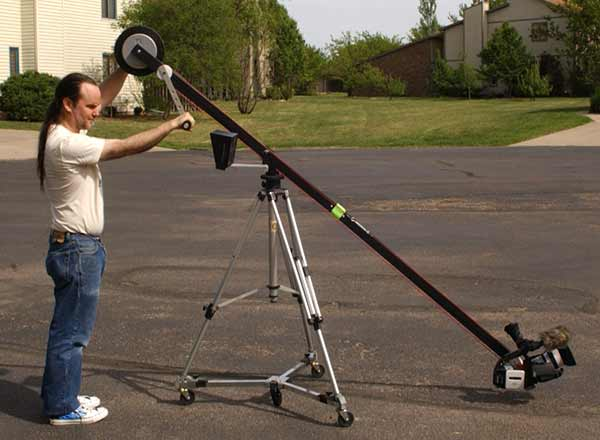
Operating a jib from the rear.

Camera cranes and jib cranes allow the camera to move through an extended arc.
