= Bipod =

Tool used to mount devices, most notably guns

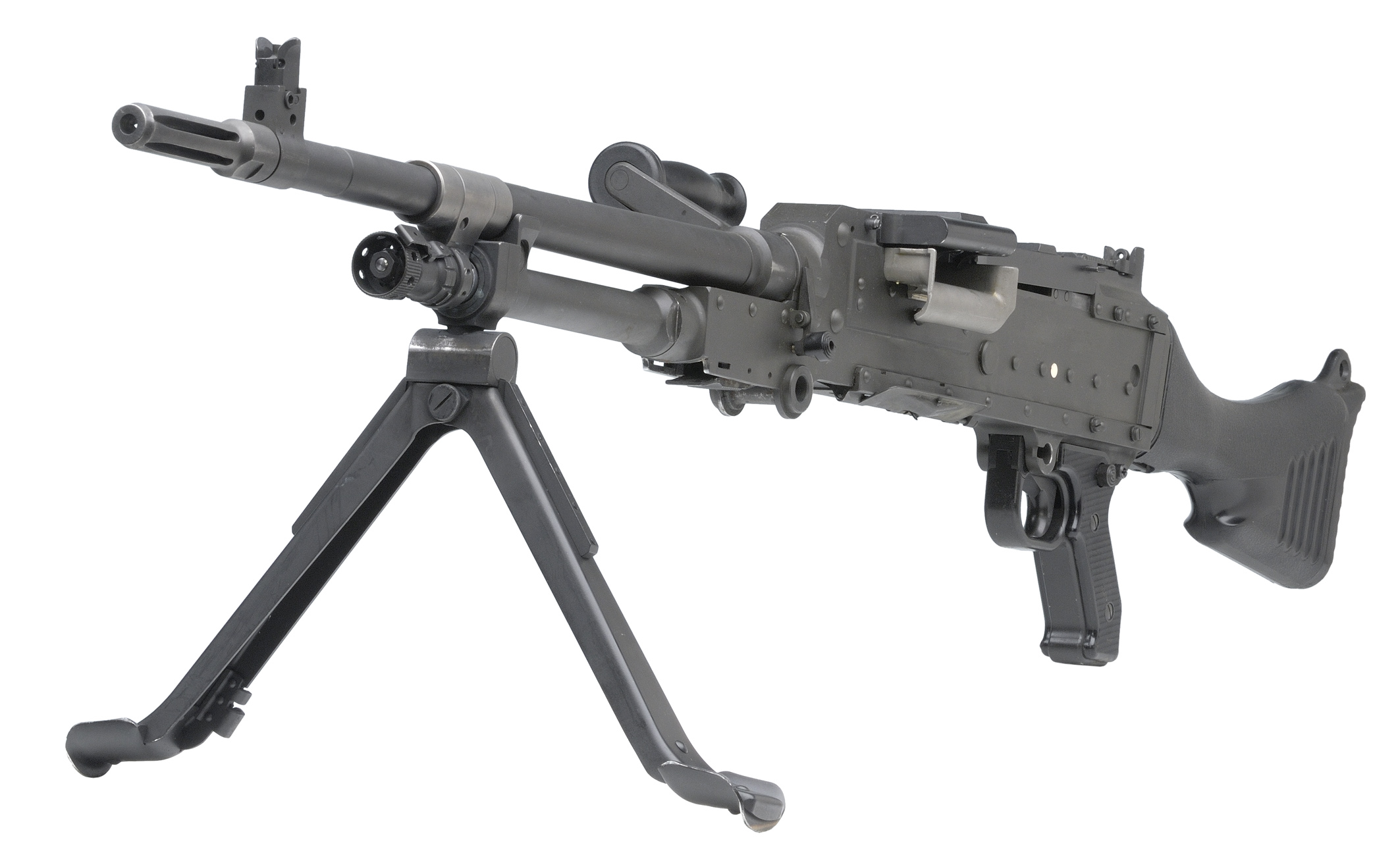
Most general-purpose machine guns, such as this FN MAG, have a bipod to increase accuracy for the full-automatic fire mode light machine gun fire support role.

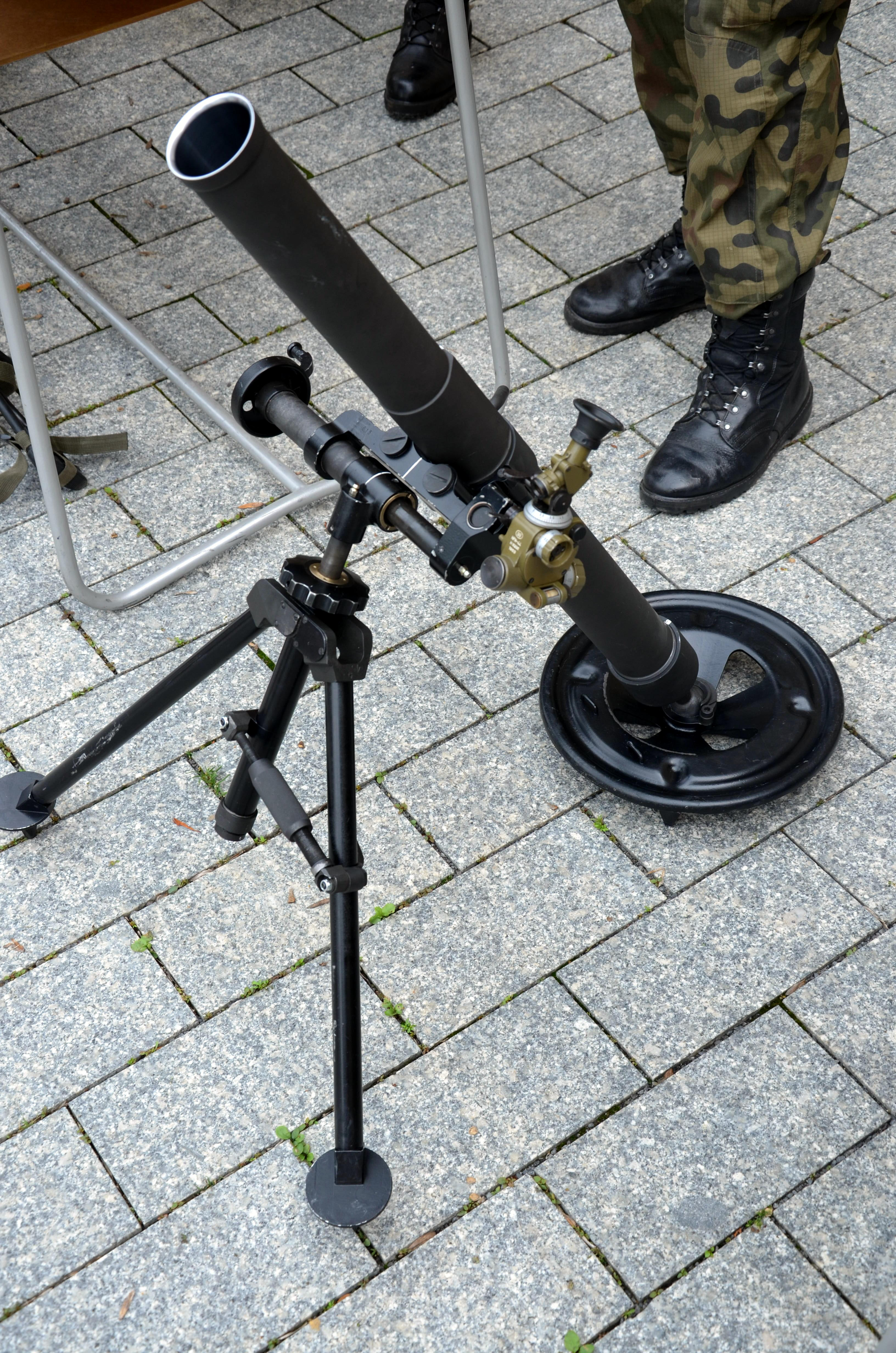
Polish LM-60D 60mm mortar with an adjustable bipod, with a baseplate as the third point of support.

A bipod is a turned-V-shaped portable attachment that helps support and steady a device, usually a weapon such as a long gun or a mortar. The term comes from the Latin prefix bi- and Greek root pod, meaning "two" and "foot" respectively.

Bipods are designed to support the weight of the weapon's front portion and barrel, and provide significant stability against unwanted side-to-side movements (i.e. canting) while allowing free movements pivoting around the transverse axis (pitching). Most modern bipods have foldable and/or telescoping legs, and allow some limited movements around the vertical axis (panning) and even the longitudinal axis (tilting).

A bipod by itself, with only two supporting legs, is not completely stable and needs to be reinforced by at least one more point of support to be steady, especially against the horizontal shearing force from recoils. This third point of support is typically the buttstock that is firmly pushed/braced against the shooter's body, but can also be a baseplate (in mortars), sometimes with additional support from a monopod or a bean bag.

== Firearms ==
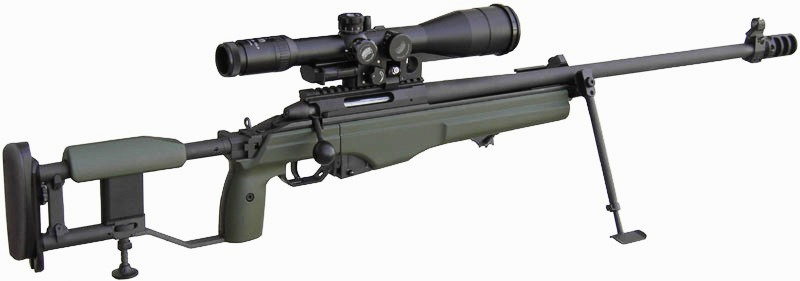
A Sako TRG sniper rifle on its standard factory bipod and it's monopod beneath the rifle's butt

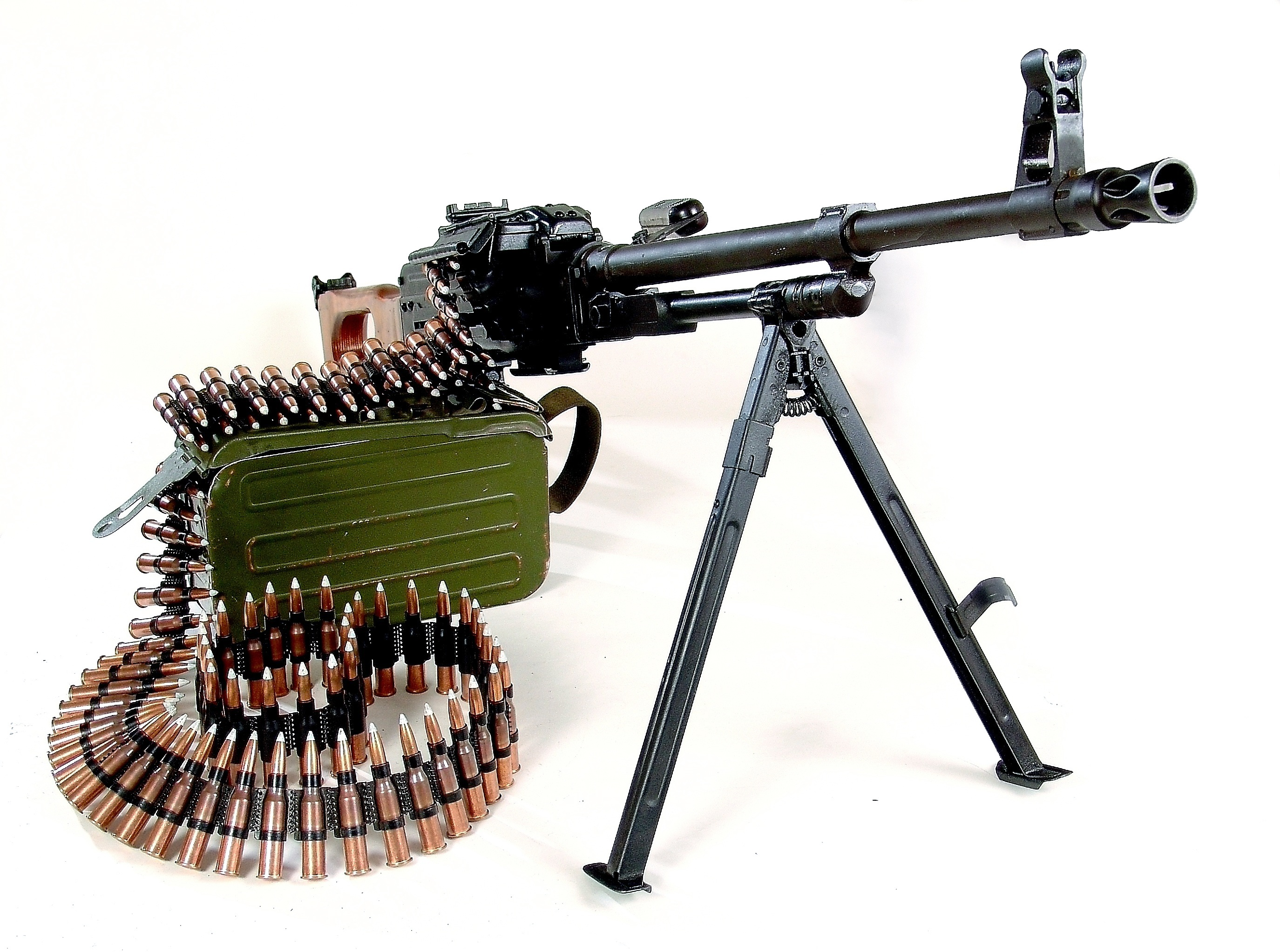
The right bipod leg of the PK GPMG accommodates links of a cleaning rod

Bipods are commonly used on rifles and machine guns to provide a forward rest and reduce unwanted motion. They are also seen on other long-barreled weapons. Bipods permit operators to easily rest a weapon on objects, such the ground or a wall, reducing fatigue and increasing accuracy and stability. Bipods can be of fixed or adjustable length. Some can be tilted and also have their tilting point close to the barrel's central axis, allowing the weapon to tilt left and right. Some designs also allow the weapon to be rotated side-to-side. There are three ways for bipods to be folded: away from the shooter, towards the shooter, or into a vertical foregrip.

=== History ===
The first known use of bipods on firearms can be traced back to hand cannons of the 12th century, which were cast iron barrels laid on top of short poles.

Bipods on rifles are first known to have been used in an improvised fashion during the mid-19th century, particularly by frontiersmen hunting American bison and other wild animals. For example, the painting "The Long Shot" by Howard Terpning shows native American hunters shooting a rifle with an improvised bipod consisting of two crossed arrows.

During the 20th century, use of dedicated bipods increased, and was seen on different types of rifles during wars. For example the Lewis gun (1914) was fitted with an adjustable bipod. The technology became more advanced, with hinged legs and even extendable or retractable legs. The Brixia M1923 machine gun used a bipod that could also be used as a harness allowing the user to move around firing the weapon handling only the spade grips.

One of the first companies to manufacture commercially successful bipods was Harris Engineering, Inc founded in 1979 in Barlow, Kentucky by Gerald Harris, Margaret Harris, and Susan Wilkerson. Before starting the company, Gerald had applied for a patent on the bipod. In 2019, their successful Harris Bipods have been produced for nearly forty years, and have remained relatively unchanged.

Recent advances in manufacture of bipods include use of lightweight materials such as aluminium, carbon fiber and titanium, use of different quick attachment and detachment mechanisms (Picatinny, M-LOK, etc. or even magnets) and various types of feet materials such as rubber, metal, or a "basket" designed to stop the bipod from sinking into soft surfaces such as fine sand or deep snow (inspired by ski poles and snowshoes).

=== Mounting standards ===
There are several mounting standards for attaching a bipod to a rifle, of which some well known are swivel stud, Picatinny, M-LOK and Versa Pod spigot mount. Starting in the late 2010s, the Arca-Swiss style also gained popularity in shooting competitions such as the Precision Rifle Series since the rail allows for stepless adjustment.

== See also ==
- Tripod
- Monopod
- Shear legs - large bipods used for lifting items
- Shooting sticks (weapon mount)
