= Ball head =

Type of tripod head

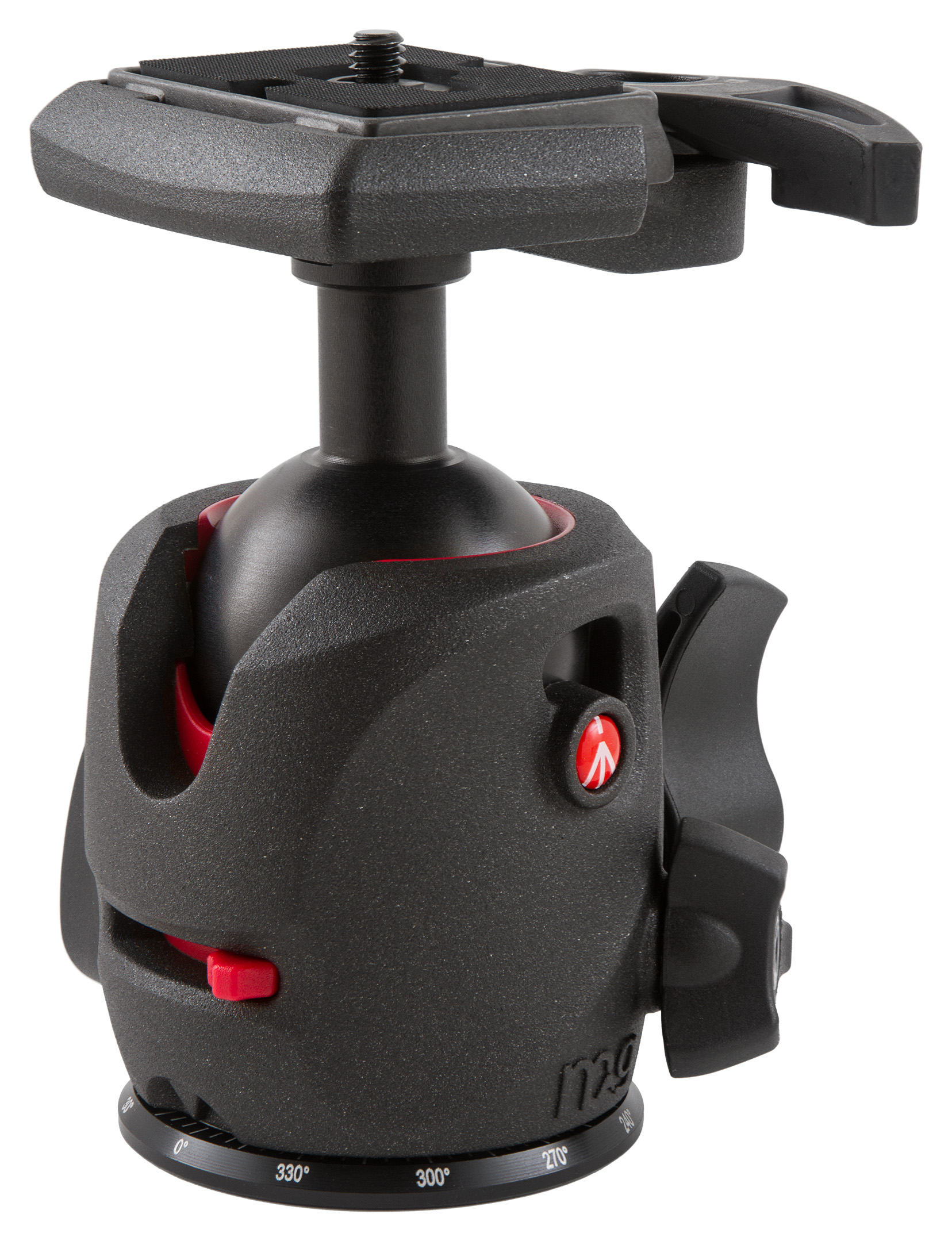
A ball head made by Manfrotto

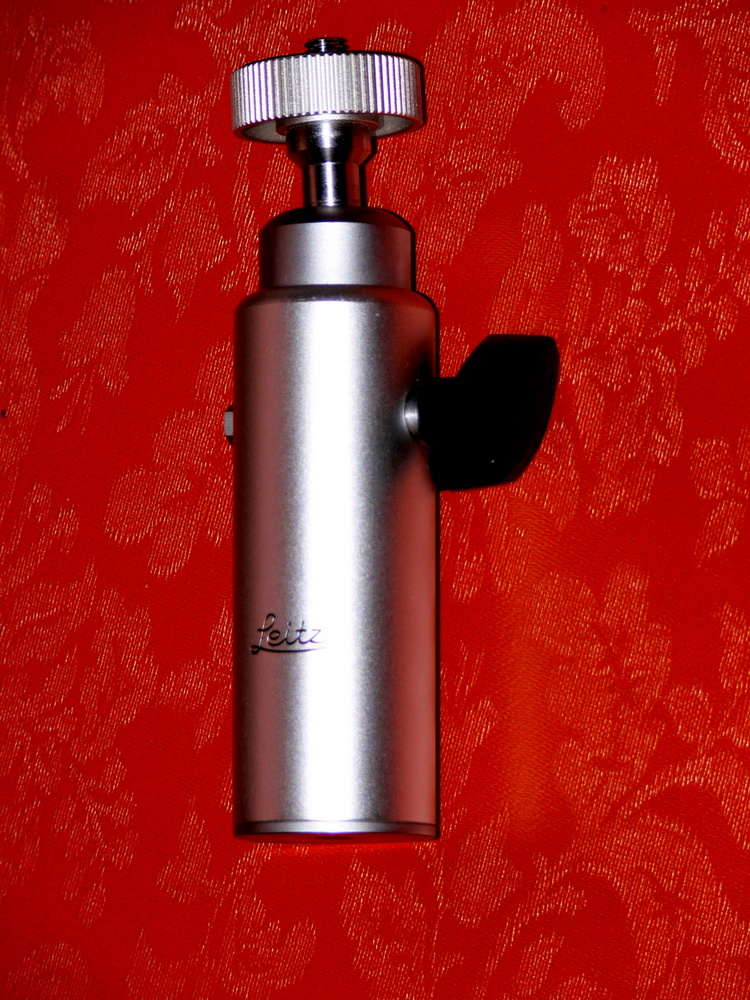
Leica large ball head

A ball head is a metal or plastic apparatus placed on top of a tripod that increases stability and provides faster, more accurate rotation of the camera for the photographer. They are lighter than traditional three-way pan-tilt tripod heads. With fewer parts and a much simpler mechanism, ball heads are usually preferred by more advanced photographers. They are usually quite expensive – most professional-quality heads are more than US$200, although some heads are available for less than $100.

== See also ==
- Tripod head
