= Berlebach =

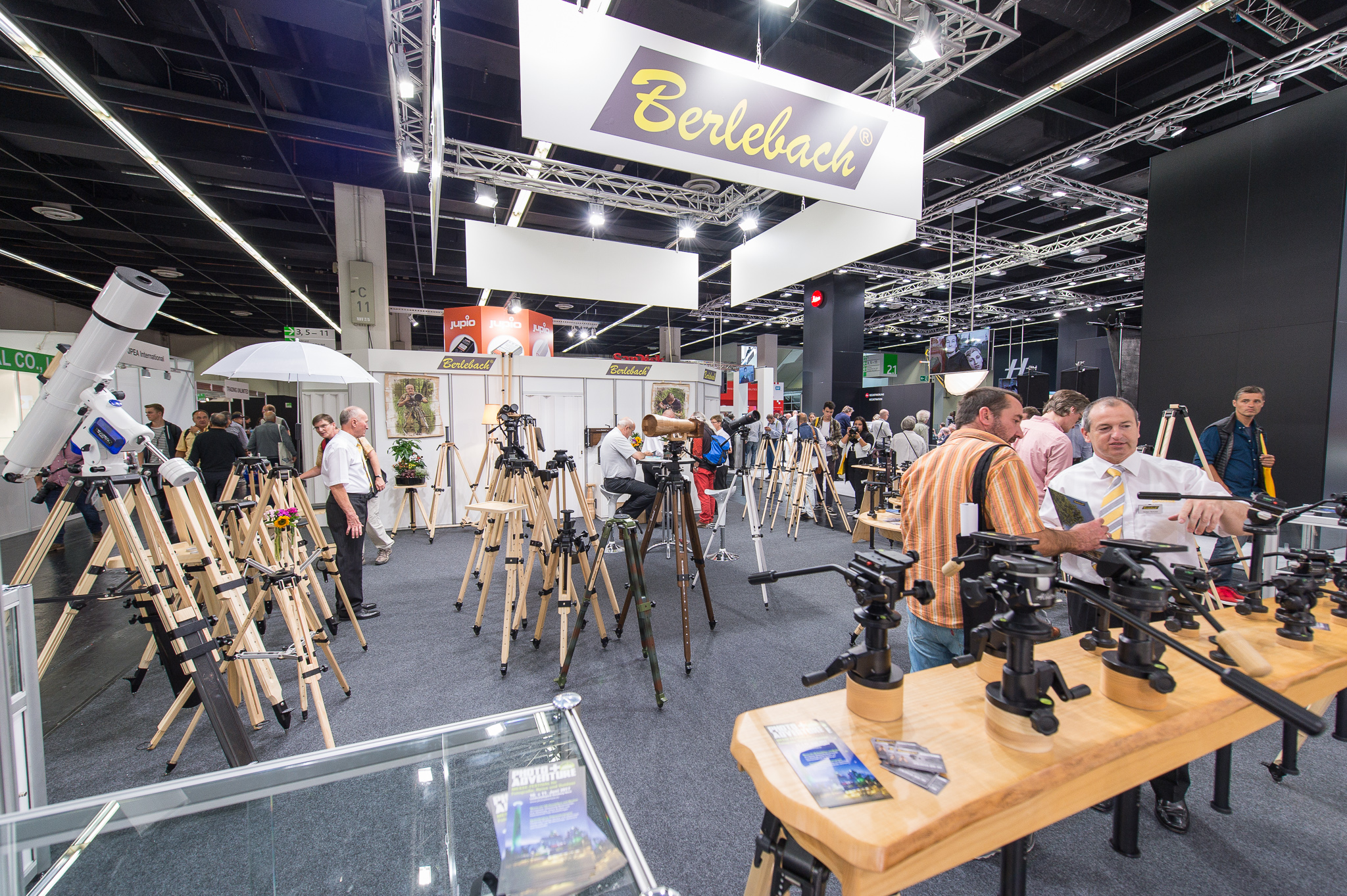
Berlebach at the Photokina 2016

Berlebach Stativtechnik is a manufacturer of tripods and monopods from Mulda, Germany. They are known for their tripods being made from ash wood (Fraxinus excelsior), and manufacture products for photography, telescopes and surveying.

== History ==
Berlebach was founded by Peter Otto Berlebach in 1898. According to the Hamberg Export Handbook (de: Hamburger Export-Handbuch) from 1906, tripods were already being supplied to England at that time.

After Peter Otto Berlebach retired in 1918, the company was taken over by Dittmar Biskaborn, and Heisinger, three former employees of Ernemann. In 1972, the family business was nationalised in the GDR and renamed VEB Foto-Kino-Zubehör, supplying tripods to the entire Eastern Bloc.

In 1990, the company came under trustee administration. After extended negotiations, Wolfgang Fleischer, who had been a senior employee at Berlebach since 1962, was able to purchase the company in 1993.

In 1994 Berlebach made its first appearance at the Photokina trade fair and has since become a leading manufacturer of wooden tripods. Today they export to more than 40 countries worldwide.

== Characteristics ==
Berlebach tripods are considered to be particularly low oscillation due to the ash wood used in their production, and are therefore used alongside heavy telephoto lenses by amateur astronomers with telescopes, in astrophotography, and in macrophotography. In colder regions, the material composition allows the tripod to be handled without gloves.

== Products ==
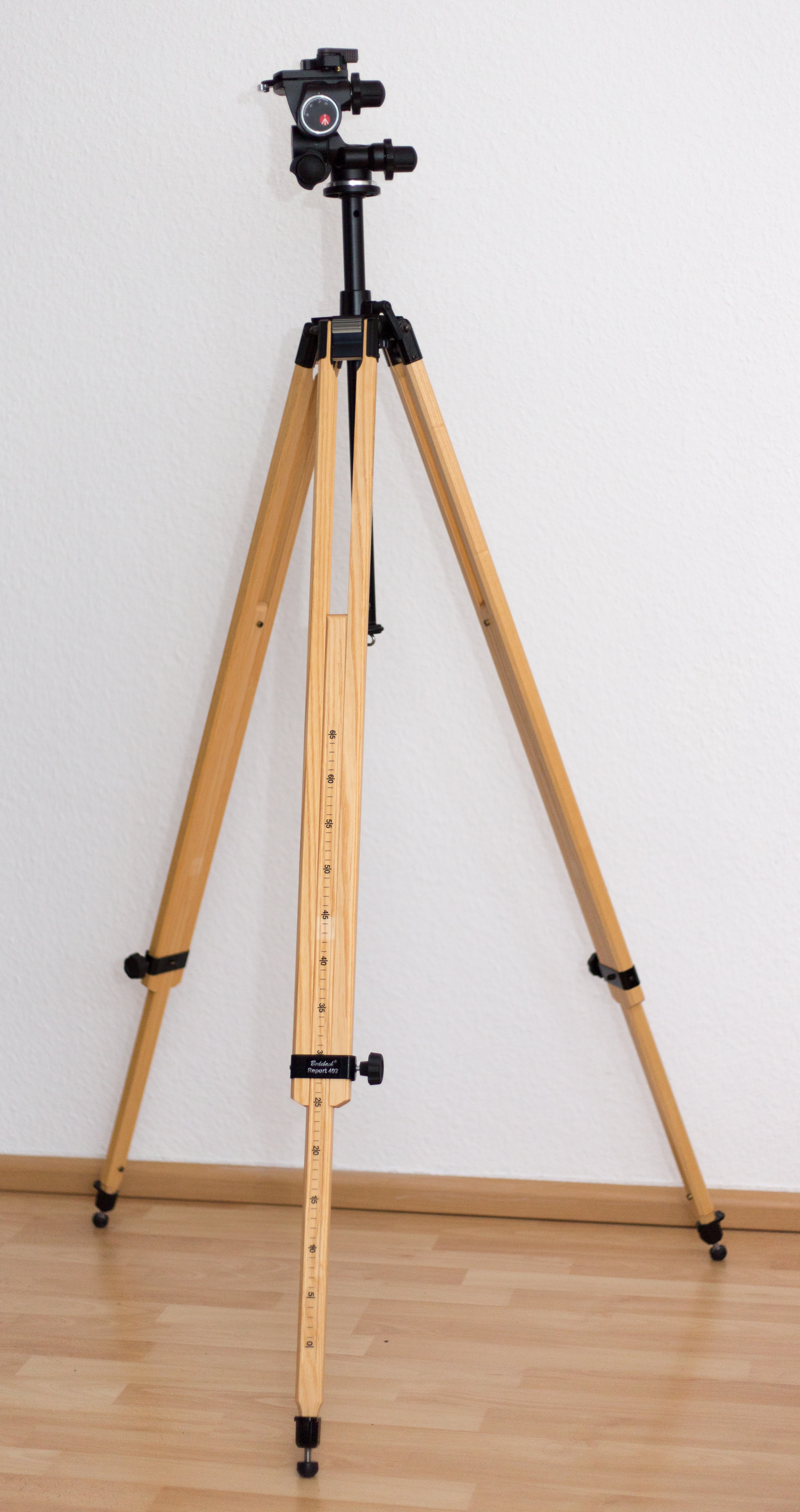
Berlebach Tripod Report 422

=== Photography tripods ===
Berlebach produces several lines of photography tripods and monopods with a maximum working high between 36 and 175 centimetres (14 and 69 in), which can be extended by centre column, including the Berlebach Report and UNI tripod series.

The Report and UNI tripod series offer various modules, including options that allow the tripod head to be tilted to compensate for inclinations. Different column lengths are also available.

The Report series consists of three tripods with 3-section legs and four tripods with 2-section legs, covering a maximum working height ranging from 87 cm to 163 cm, with weights between 1.9 kg and 3.2 kg.

The UNI series includes one tripod with 3-section legs and three tripods with 2-section legs, covering a maximum working height between 80 cm and 164 cm, with weights ranging from 4.2 kg to 6.4 kg.

The product range additionally includes mini, monopod, wall, and car disc tripods.

=== Astro tripods ===
Berlebach also produces tripods for astronomy applications as bases for telescopes. The PLANET, SKY, and GRAVITON tripods within their astronomy tripod range, can carry up to 120 kilograms (260 lb), 140 kilograms (310 lb), and 220 kilograms (490 lb) respectively.

Two tripods, namely the Report and UNI, are based on the photographic tripods and designed for load capacity of up to 25 kilograms (55 lb) and 60 kilograms (130 lb) respectively.

=== EMC tripods ===
Berlebach produces special tripods for electromagnetic compatibility measurement purposes. These tripods contain little or no metal in their construction.

=== Other products ===
Berlebach additionally manufactures astro chairs, tripod heads, mounts and adapters.
