= Tilt (camera) =

Swiveling a camera vertically from a fixed position

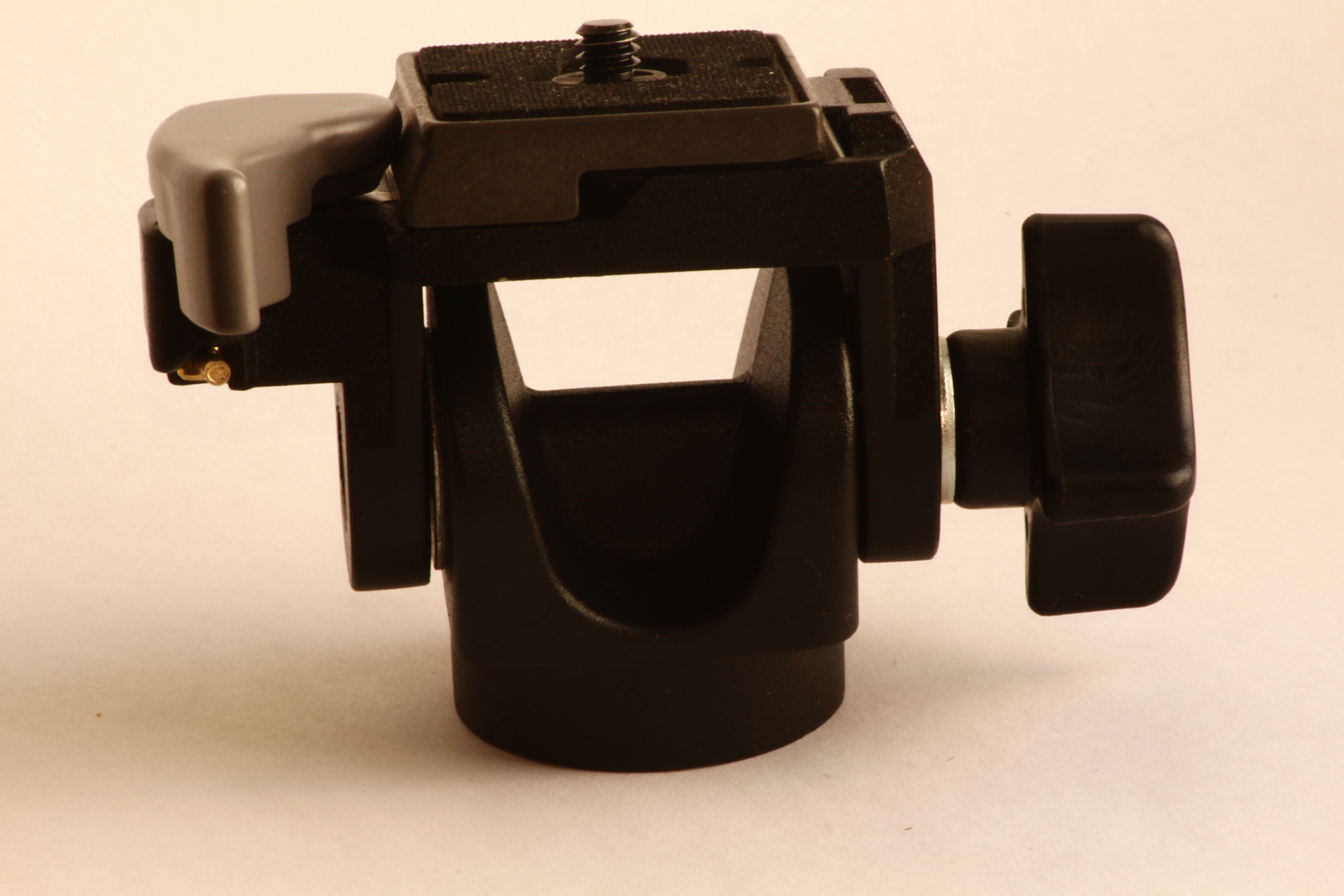
One-way tilt head style tripod head

Tilting is a cinematographic technique in which the camera stays in a fixed position but rotates up/down in a vertical plane. Tilting the camera results in a motion similar to someone raising or lowering their head to look up or down. It is distinguished from panning in which the camera is horizontally pivoted left or right. Pan and tilt can be used simultaneously. In some situations the lens itself may be tilted with respect to the fixed camera body in order to generate greater depth of focus.

The camera's tilt will change the position of the horizon, changing the amount of sky or ground that is seen. A tilt downward is usually required for a high-angle shot and bird's-eye view while a tilt upward is for a low-angle shot and worm's-eye view. The vertical offset between subjects can reflect differences in power, with superiority being above.

Tilting can be used as a reveal as in tilting up from seeing the murder victim, to the weapon, to the identity of the killer. It can also be an establishing shot, tilting down from a tall landmark to the characters or as in the Star Wars: A New Hope opening, tilting down from the stars, to the arc of the planet.

A tilting Point-of-view shot expresses either attention or head motion. Attention might convey a potential physical attraction by looking somebody up and down, or concern with sizing up an opponent. Head motion could show a nodding "yes". Combining tilt with camera position could show a face planting or tipping over backwards.

Minor tilting is used for reframing to maintain headroom.

Extreme tilting would follow the subject past the zenith or nadir to a full 180 degrees, starting or ending with an inverted view of the world.

The Dutch angle, also known as Dutch tilt, is a head tilt to one side and a type of camera shot where the camera is set at an angle on its roll axis so that the shot is composed with vertical lines at an angle to the side of the frame, or so that the horizon line of the shot is not parallel with the bottom of the camera frame.

== See also ==
- Pan tilt zoom camera (PTZ)
- Panning (camera)
- Tripod (photography)
- View camera
- Zoom lens
