= Panoramic tripod head =

Tripod head used to help produce a panorama

A panoramic tripod head keeps the point of view of the camera stationary by placing it in the axis of rotation. One must use the mount to adjust for the difference between the tripod mount and the focal point of the camera. This is accomplished by sliders on the mount.

A panoramic tripod head is a piece of photographic equipment, mounted to a tripod, which allows photographers to shoot a sequence of images around the entrance pupil of a lens that can be used to produce a panorama. The primary function of the panoramic head is to precisely set the point of rotation about the entrance pupil for a given lens and focal length, eliminating parallax error.

To take a panorama, the camera is rotated at fixed angular increments, taking an image at each point. These images can then be assembled (stitched) using stitching software, which allows the images to be aligned and combined into a single seamless panoramic image, either automatically (using image analysis) or manually (with user supplied control points). The final panoramic image can then be viewed or printed as a flat image or viewed interactively using specific playback software.

Professional models include precision bearings, scales to allow the user to take photos at specific angles, detents to stop at common angles and integrated levels to aid in adjusting the tripod.

Robotic panoramic heads are also available. The robotic head performs the rotation and image capture functions automatically under computer control. Robotic heads can also be used with time-lapse photography.
