= Tripod (photography) =

Provides for the stable formation of cameras

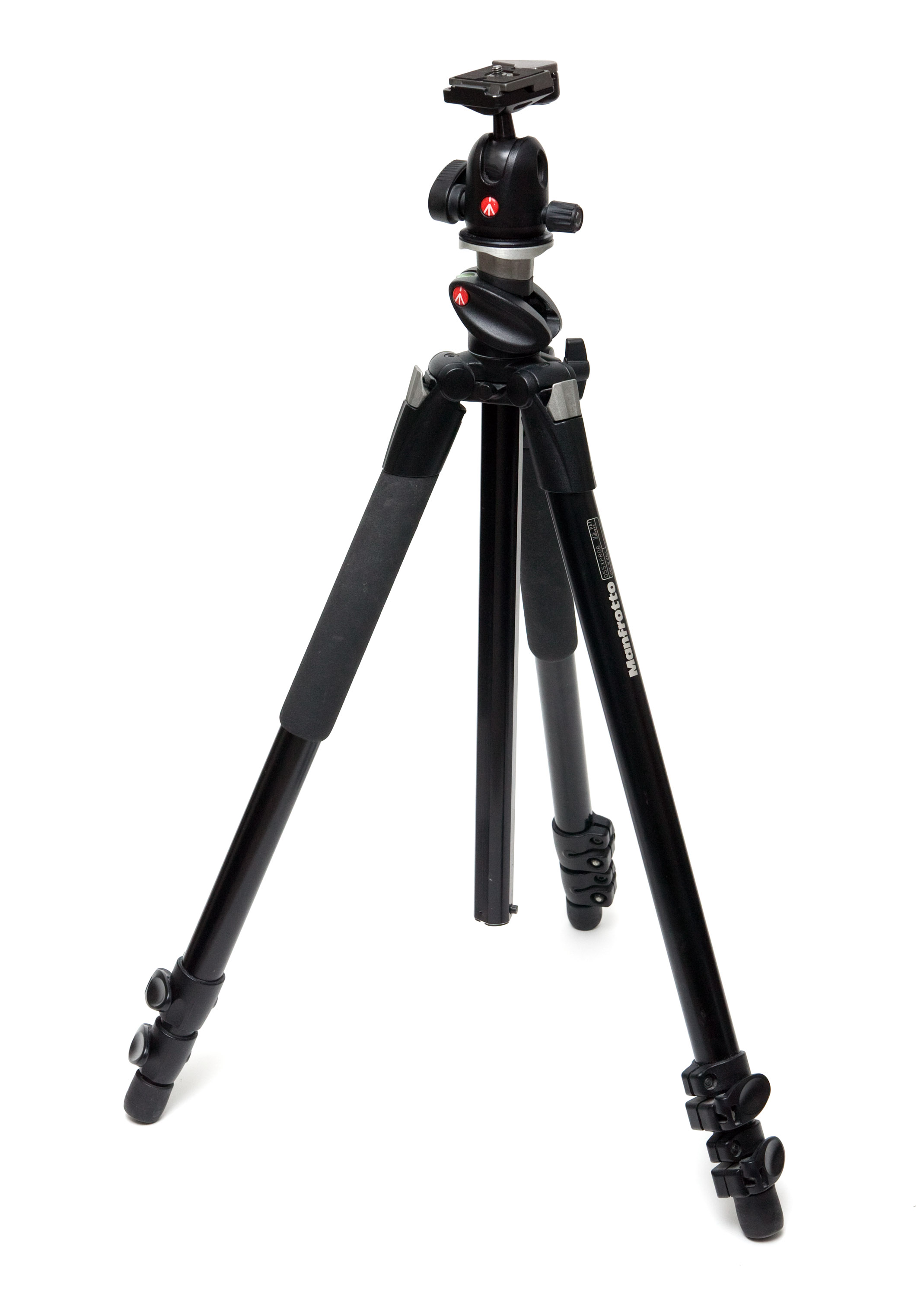
A photographic tripod

In photography, a tripod is a portable device used to support, stabilize and elevate a camera, a flash unit, or other videographic or observational/measuring equipment. Photographic tripods have three legs and a mounting head to couple with a camera. The mounting head usually includes a thumbscrew that mates to a female-threaded receptacle on the camera, as well as a mechanism to allow rotating and tilting the camera when it is mounted on the tripod. Tripod legs are usually made to telescope, in order to save space when not in use. Tripods are usually made from aluminum, carbon fiber, steel, wood or plastic.

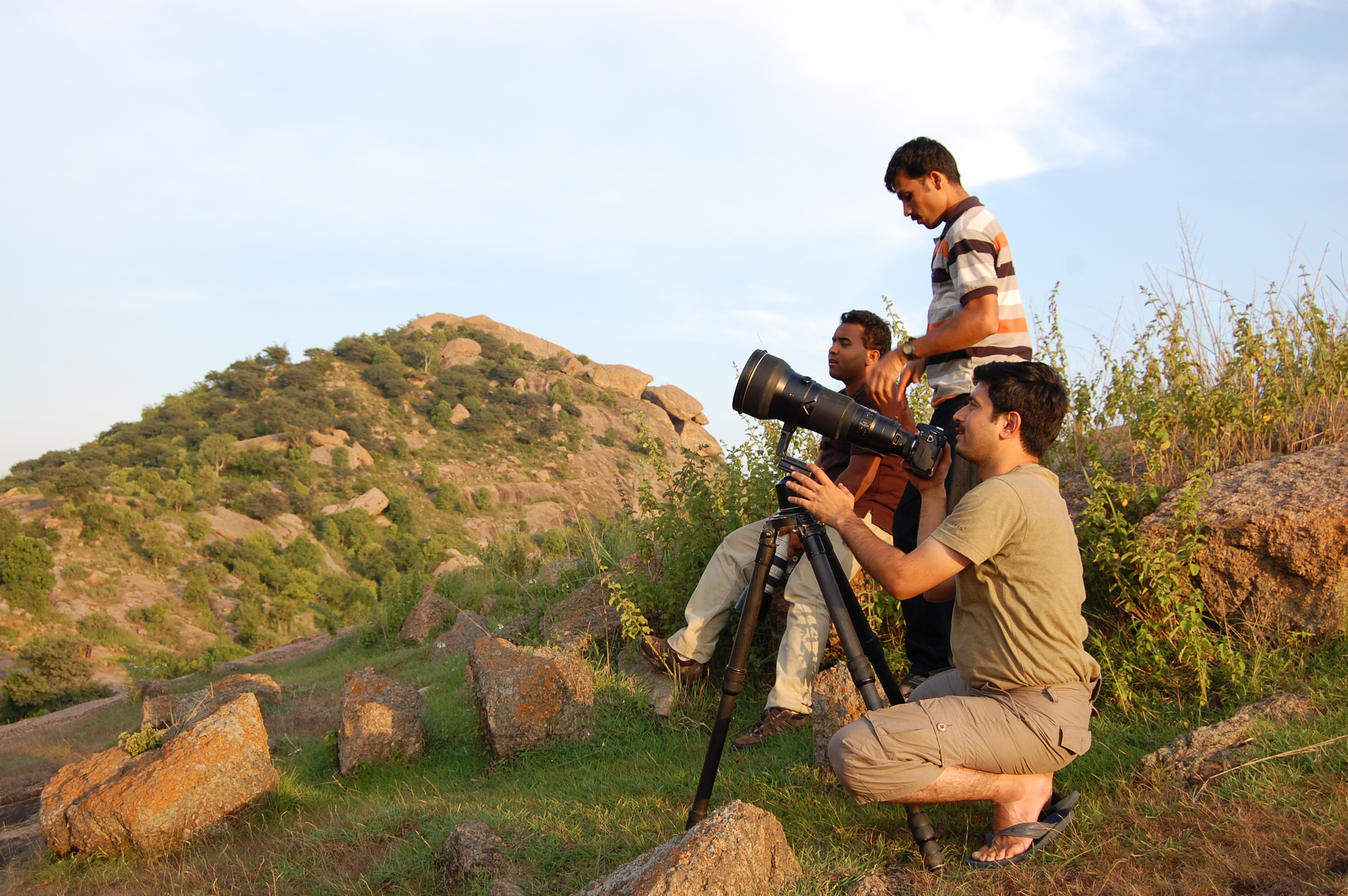
Photographers with heavy telephoto lens attachments use a tripod to stabilize their camera to get sharp images

Tripods are used for both still and motion photography to prevent camera movement. They are necessary when slow-speed exposures are being made, or when lenses of extreme focal length are used, as any camera movement while the shutter is open will produce a blurred image. They reduce camera shake, and thus are instrumental in achieving maximum sharpness. A tripod is also helpful in achieving precise framing of the image, or when more than one image is being made of the same scene, for example when bracketing the exposure. The use of a tripod may also allow for a more thoughtful approach to photography. For all of these reasons, a tripod of some sort is often necessary for professional photography. Tripods are also used as an alternative to C-Stands as photographic accessories.

== Construction ==
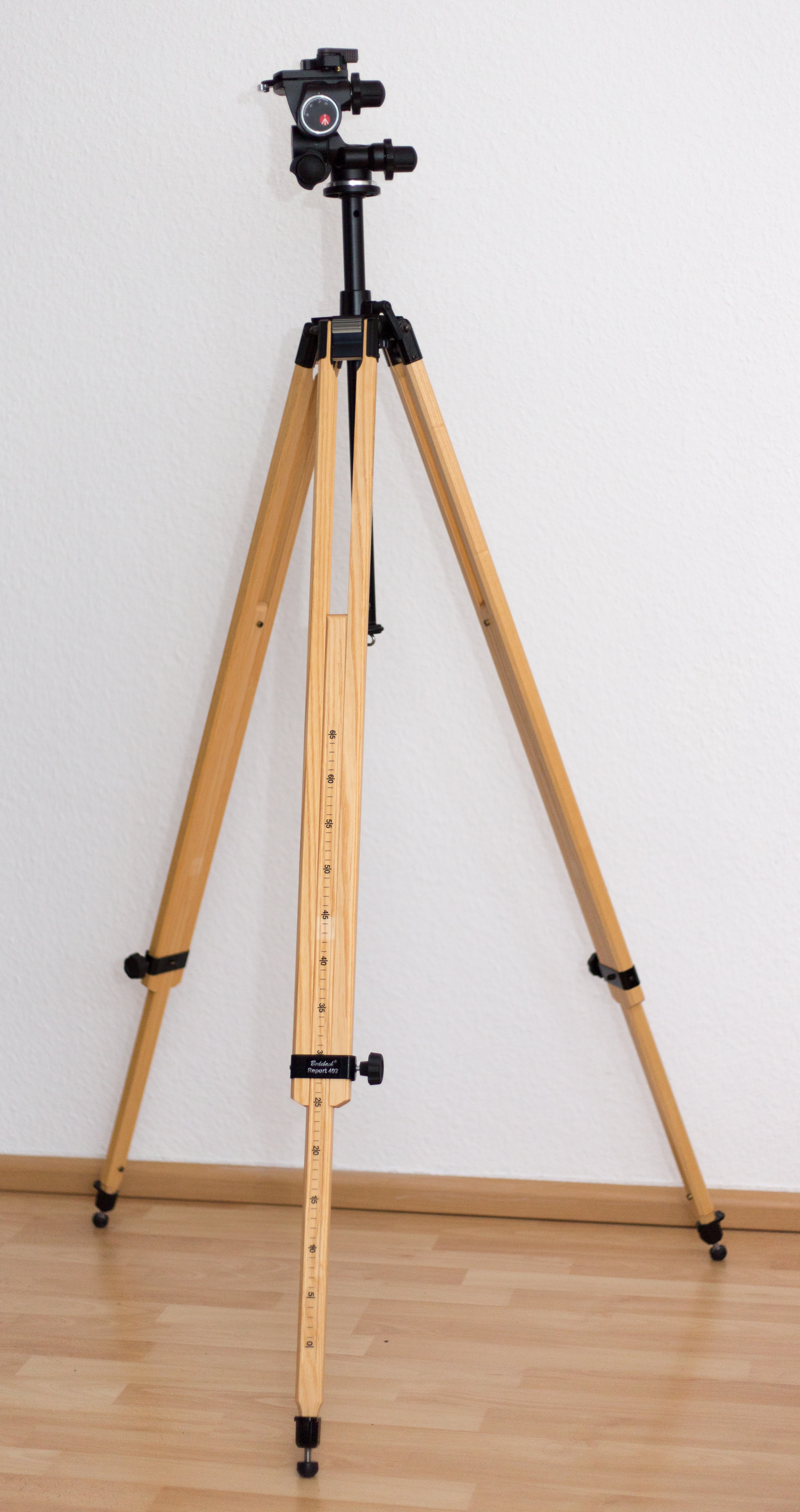
Berlebach Tripod Report 422 made from wood (ash)

For maximum strength and stability, most photographic tripods are braced around a center post, with collapsible telescoping legs and a telescoping section at the top that can be raised or lowered. At the top of the tripod is the head, which includes the camera mount (usually a detachable plate with a thumbscrew to hold on to the camera), several joints to allow the camera to pan, rotate and tilt, and usually a handle to allow the operator to do so without jostling the camera. Some tripods also feature integrated remote controls to control a camcorder or camera, though these are usually proprietary to the company that built the camera. Materials used in the construction of tripod or monopod legs include metal (typically bare or painted aluminum), wood and carbon fiber-reinforced plastics, among others.

=== Bolt threads ===
Per ISO 1222:2010, the current tripod bolt thread standard for attaching the camera calls for a 1/4-20 UNC or 3/8-16 UNC thread. Most consumer cameras are fitted with 1/4-20 UNC threads. Larger, professional cameras and lenses may be fitted with 3/8-16 UNC threads, plus a removable 1/4-20 UNC adapter, allowing them to be mounted on a tripod using either standard.

Historically, The Royal Photographic Society recommended the thread standard for attaching older cameras to tripods was 3/16-24 BSW (3/16 inch nominal diameter, 24 threads per inch), or 1/4-20 BSW for smaller cameras and 3/8-16 BSW for larger cameras and pan/tilt heads. In this application, the BSW and UNC thread profiles are similar enough that one can mount a modern camera on a legacy tripod and vice versa. The UNC threads are at a 60-degree angle and flattened, whereas the BSW are at a 55-degree angle and rounded crest. However, at least one English manufacturer uses No.1 B.A. (British Association screw threads) for tripod mounts.

== Variations ==
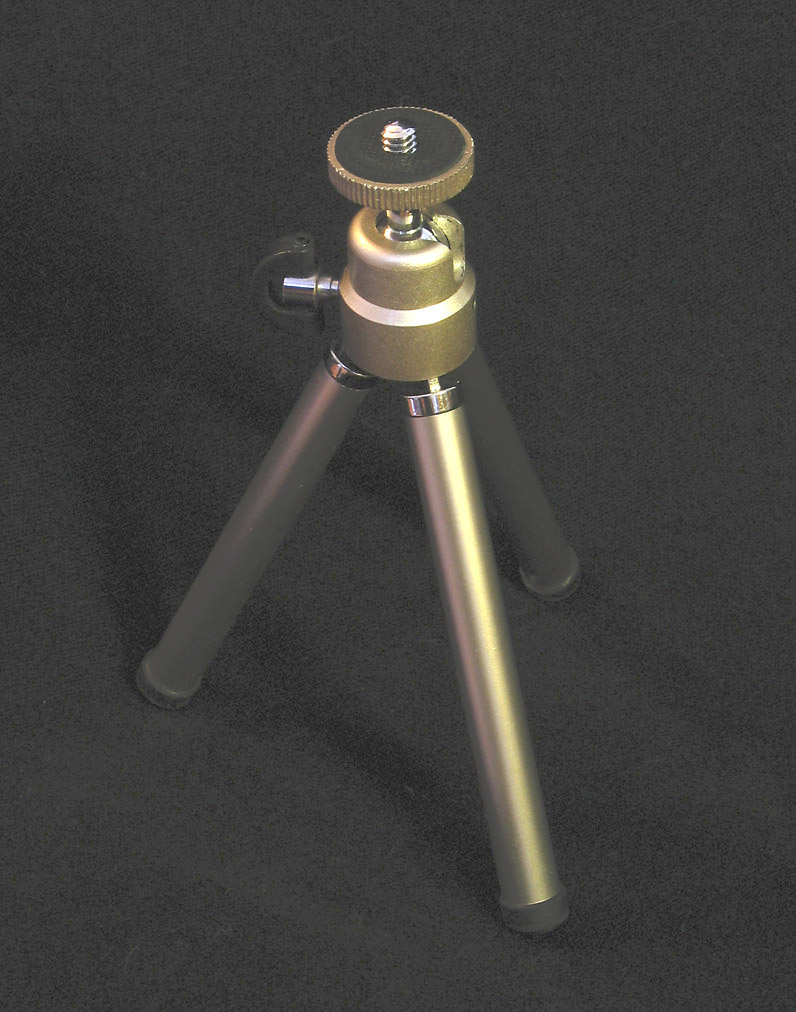
A tabletop tripod with a ball head.

There are several types of tripods. The least expensive, generally made of aluminum tubing and costing less than US$50, is used primarily for consumer still and video cameras; these generally come with an attached head and rubber feet. The head is very basic, and often not entirely suitable for smooth panning of a camcorder. A common feature, mostly designed for still cameras, allows the head to flip sideways 90 degrees to allow the camera to take pictures in portrait format rather than landscape. Often included is a small pin on the front of the mounting screw that is used to stabilize camcorders. This is not found on the more expensive photographic tripods.

More expensive professional tripods are sturdier, stronger, and usually come with no integrated head. The separate heads allow a tripod-head combination to be customized to the photographer's needs. There are expensive carbon fiber tripods, used for applications where the tripod needs to be lightweight. Many tripods, even some relatively inexpensive ones, also include leveling indicators for the legs of the tripod and the head.

Many of the more expensive tripods have additional features, such as a reversible center post so that the camera may be mounted between the legs, allowing for shots from low positions, and legs that can open to several different angles.

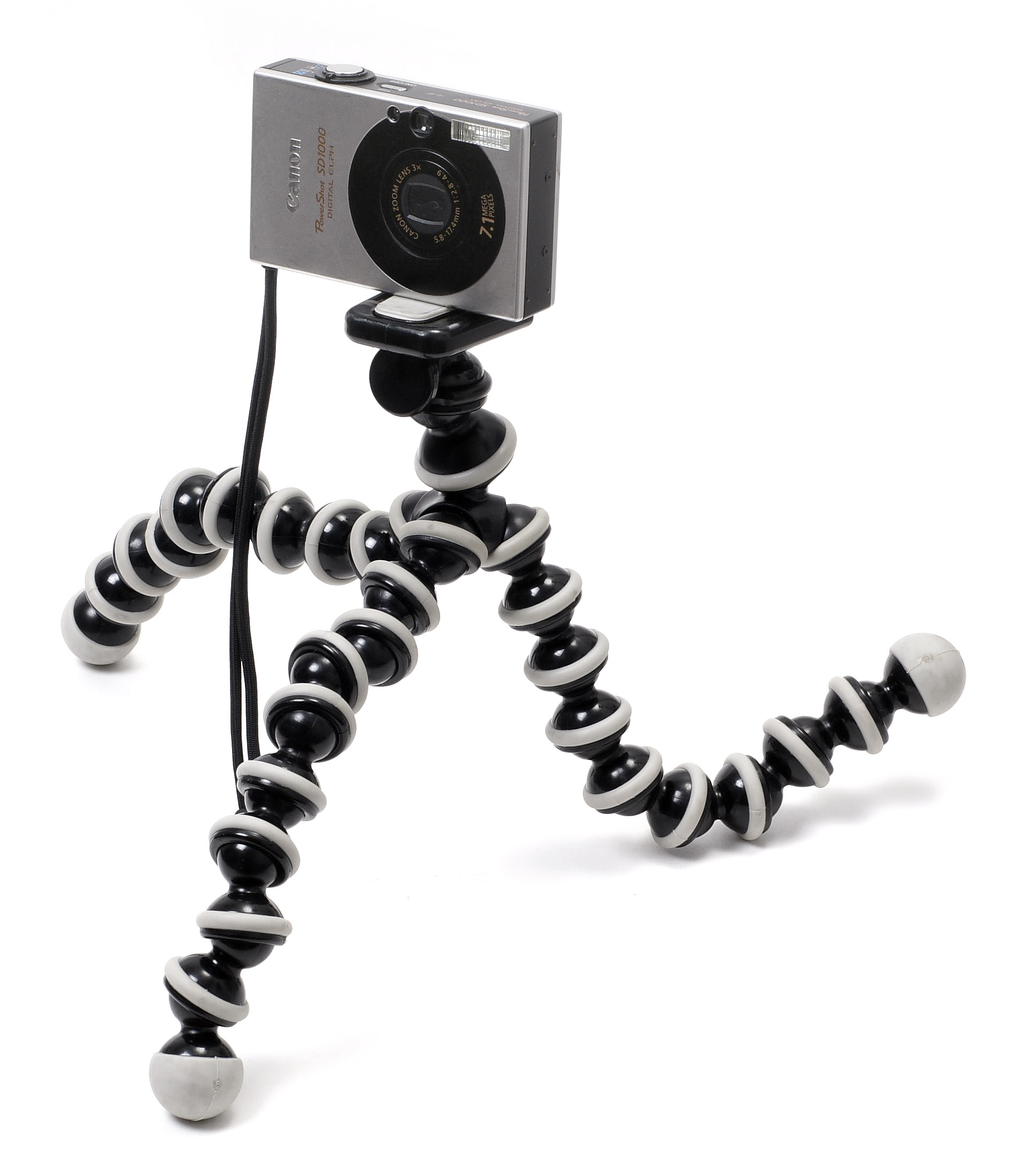
A tripod with flexible legs permitting it to grip to some objects.

Small tabletop tripods (sometimes called tablepods) are also available, ranging from relatively flimsy models costing less than US$20, to professional models that can cost up to US$800 and can support up to 68 kg (150 lb). They are used in situations where a full sized tripod would be too bulky to carry. An alternative is a clamp-pod, which is a ball head attached to a C-clamp.

Another technique involves forming a string triangle held taut around the two feet of the photographer and linked to the camera. This negative string "tripod" can stabilize the camera sufficiently to use a shutter speed three stops slower.

=== Heads ===
The head is the part of the tripod that attaches to the camera and allows it to be aimed. It may be integrated into the tripod, or a separate part. There are generally two different types of heads available.

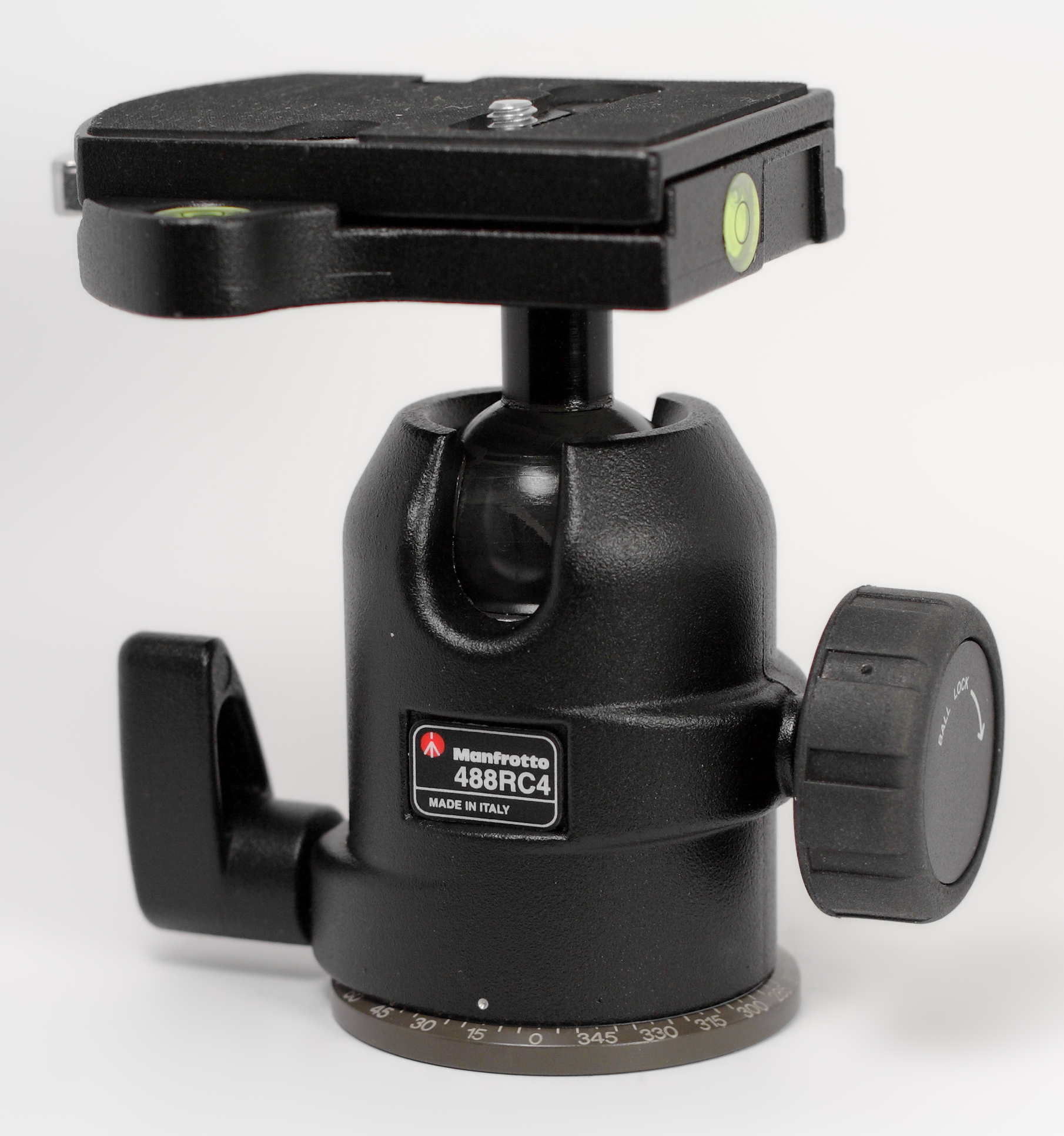
A ball head, showing panoramic rotation lock lever, and ball lock knob.

A ball head utilizes a ball joint to allow rotational movement about all axes from a single point. Some ball heads also have a separate panoramic rotation joint on the base of the head. The head has two main parts, the ball, which attaches to the camera, and the socket, which attaches to the tripod. The camera is attached to the ball by means of quick release plate or a simple UNC 1/4"-20 screw. The socket encloses the rotating ball and also contains the controls for locking the ball. The socket has a slot on the side to allow the camera to be rotated to the portrait orientation. Ball heads come in varying degrees of complexity. Some have only one control for both ball and pan lock, while others have individual controls for the ball lock, pan lock, and ball friction. Ball heads are used when a free-flowing movement of the camera is needed. They are also more stable and can hold heavier loads than pan-tilt heads. However, ball heads have the disadvantage that only one control is available to allow or prevent movement of all axes of rotation, so if the camera is tilted around one axis, there may be a risk of rotation about the other axes as well.

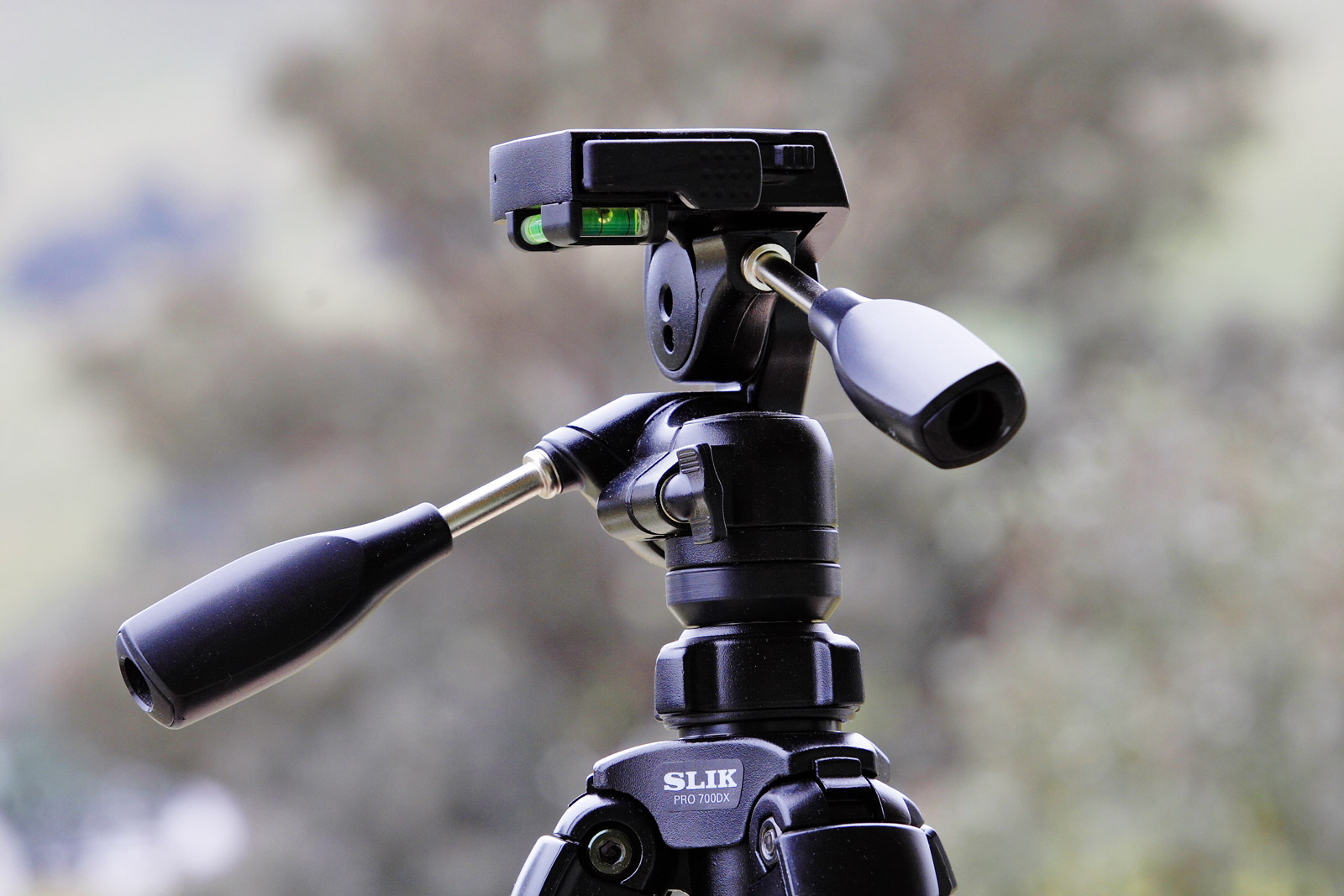
A 3-way pan-tilt head on a tripod, showing panoramic rotation, lateral tilt, and front tilt controls

When a movement around one or two axes or rotation is needed, a pan-tilt head is used. The pan-tilt head has separate joints and controls for tilting and panning, so that a certain axis can be controlled without affecting the other axes. These heads come in two types, called 2-way and 3-way. 2-way heads have 2 axes and controls, one for panoramic rotation and one for front tilt. 3-way heads have 3 axes and controls, one for panoramic rotation, front tilt, and lateral tilt. The controls on these heads are usually handles that can be turned to loosen or tighten the certain axis. This allows movement in one, several, or none of the axes. When the rotation around all axes is needed, a ball head is used. There are some pan-tilt heads that use gears for precision control of each axis. This is helpful for some types of photography, such as macro photography.

Other head types include the gimbal, fluid, gear, alt-azimuth, and equatorial heads. Fluid heads and gear heads move very smoothly, avoiding the jerkiness caused by the stick-slip effect found in other types of tripod heads. Gimbal heads are single-axis heads used in order to allow a balanced movement for camera and lenses. This proves useful in wildlife photography as well as in any other case where very long and heavy telephoto lenses are adopted: a gimbal head rotates a lens around its center of gravity, thus allowing for easy and smooth manipulation while tracking moving subjects.

=== Monopod ===
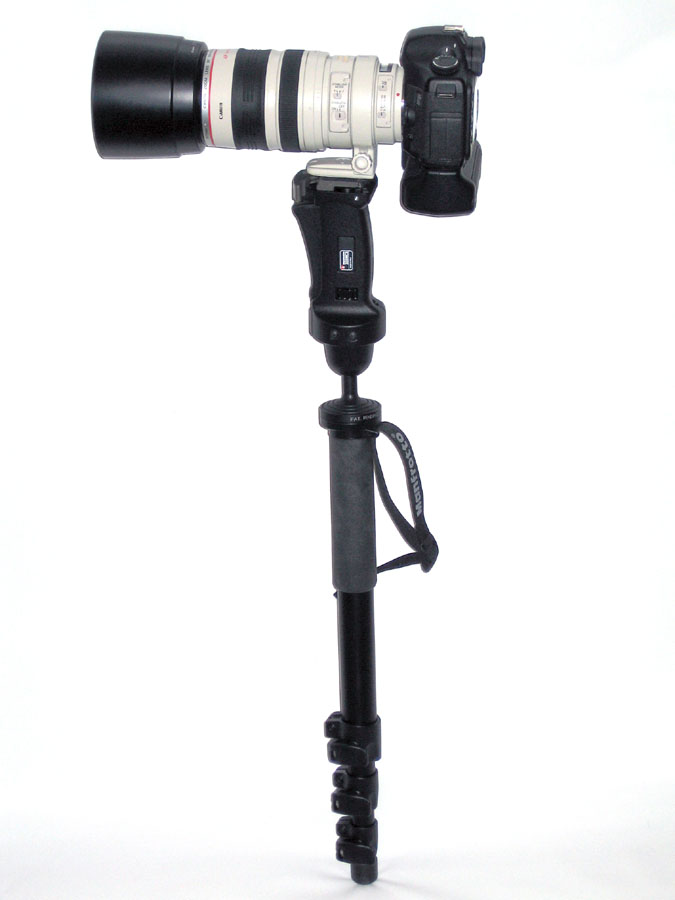
Camera and telephoto lens mounted on monopod

In place of or to supplement a tripod, some photographers use a one-legged telescoping stand called a monopod for convenience in setup and breakdown. A monopod requires the photographer to hold the camera in place, but because the monopod reduces the number of degrees of freedom of the camera, and also because the photographer no longer has to support the full weight of the camera, it can provide some of the same stabilization advantages as a tripod.

== Fixed tripods ==
For low-angle shots particularly in cinematography, short tripods with fixed length legs and no center column may be used. The lowest of these is called a low hat, with a slightly higher version referred to as a hi hat.

== Travel tripods ==
A travel tripod is one that has been designed to be small and light enough to be carried easily as hand baggage when traveling. It must also be stiff and strong enough to support a professional DSLR and fast telephoto lens. Typical specifications for a travel tripod legs would be: Weight (without head): 2 to 4 lbs (0.9 to 1.8 kg), Height (contracted): 12 to 20 inches (30 to 50 cm), Height (extended): - 60 to 70 inches (152 to 178 cm) and Max Load: 5 to 10 lbs (2.3 to 4.6 kg).

== See also ==
- Camera angle
- Close-up
- Long shot
- Low-angle shot
- Medium shot
- Point of view shot
