= Tripod =

Portable three-legged frame or stand

A tripod is a portable three-legged frame or stand, used as a platform for supporting the weight and maintaining the stability of some other object. The three-legged (triangular stance) design provides good stability against gravitational loads as well as horizontal shear forces, and better leverage for resisting tipping over due to lateral forces can be achieved by spreading the legs away from the vertical centre. Variations with one, two, and four legs are termed monopod, bipod, and quadripod (similar to a table).

== Etymology ==
First attested in English in the early 17th century, the word tripod comes via Latin tripodis (GEN of tripus), which is the romanization of Greek τρίπους (tripous), "three-footed" (GEN τρίποδος, tripodos), ultimately from τρι- (tri-), "three times" (from τρία, tria, "three") + πούς (pous), "foot". The earliest attested form of the word is the Mycenaean Greek 𐀴𐀪𐀠, ti-ri-po, written in Linear B syllabic script.

== Cultural use ==
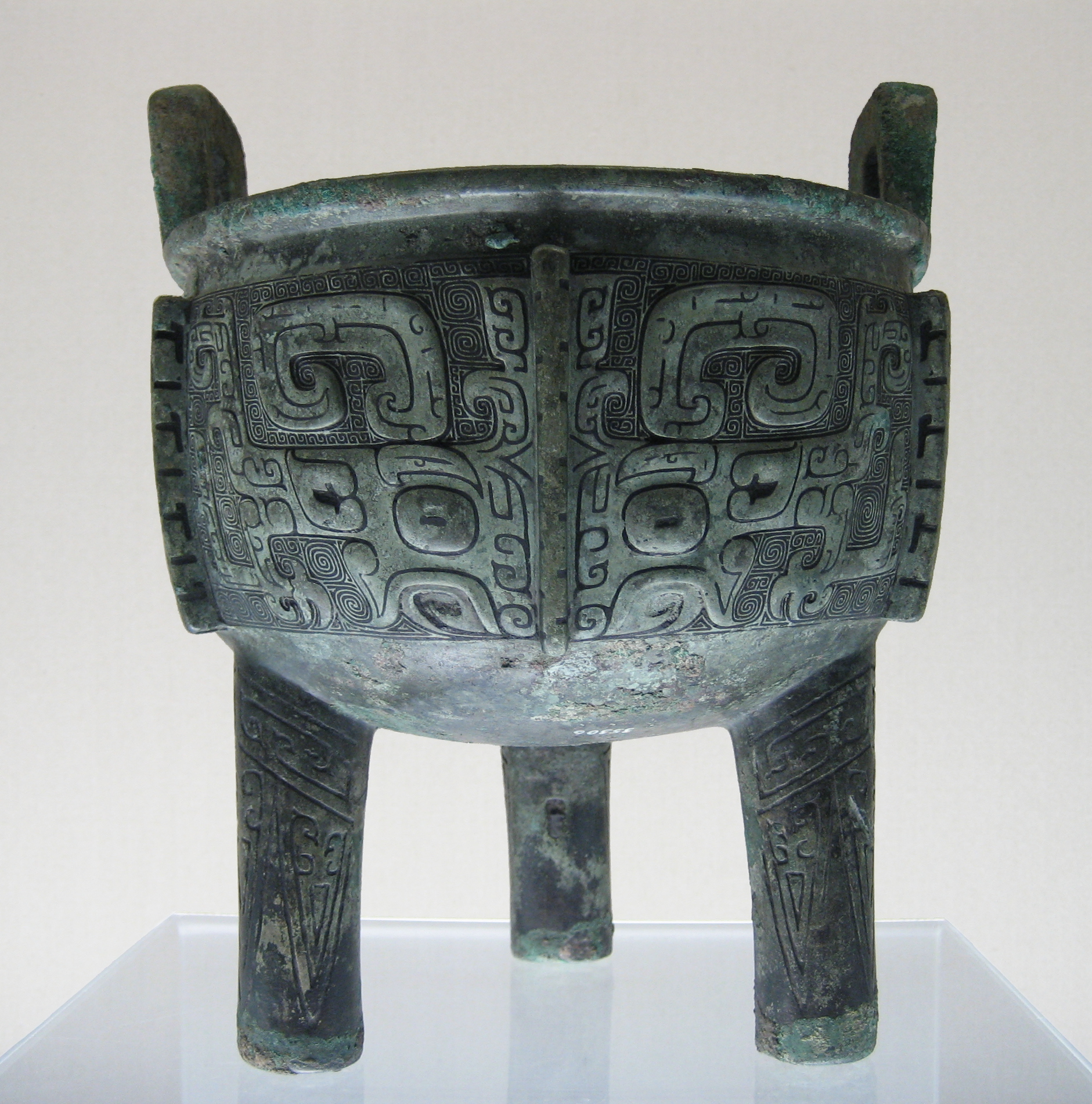
A ding (Chinese ceremonial cauldron) from the late Shang dynasty.

Many cultures, including the ancient peoples of China and Greece, used tripods as ornaments, trophies, sacrificial altars, cooking vessels or cauldrons, and decorative ceramic pottery. Tripod pottery have been part of the archaeological assemblage in China since the earliest Neolithic cultures of Cishan and Peiligang in the 7th and 8th millennia BC. Sacrificial tripods were found in use in ancient China usually cast in bronze but sometimes appearing in ceramic form. They are often referred to as "dings" and usually have three legs, but in some usages have four legs.

The Chinese use sacrificial tripods symbolically in modern times, such as in 2005, when a "National Unity Tripod" made of bronze was presented by the central Chinese government to the government of northwest China's Xinjiang Uygur Autonomous Region to mark its fiftieth birthday. It was described as a traditional Chinese sacrificial vessel symbolizing unity.

In ancient Greece, tripods were frequently used to support lebes, or cauldrons, sometimes for cooking and other uses such as supporting vases.

== Firearms ==
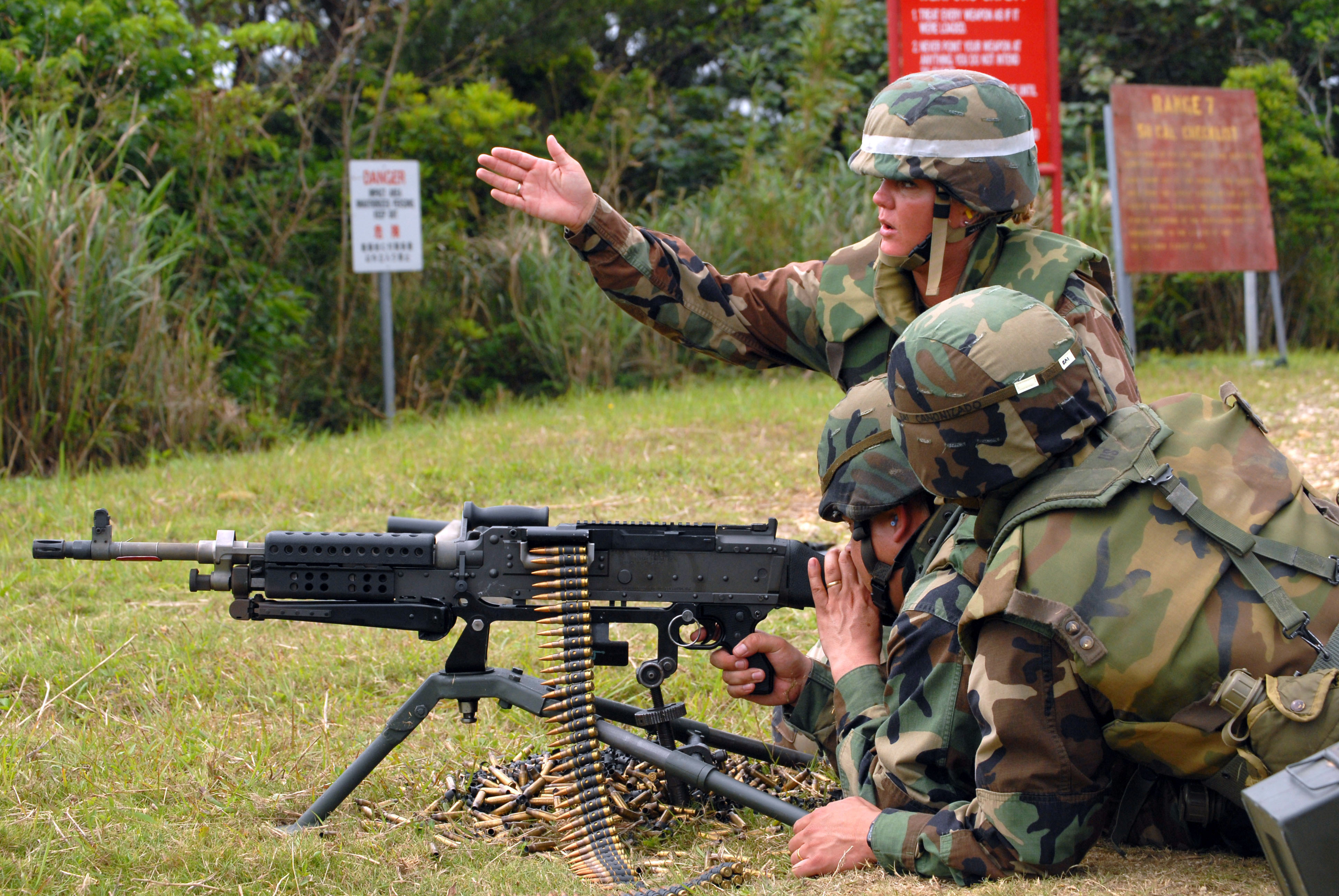
Seabees train with the M240B mounted on the M122 tripod.

Tripods are commonly used on machine guns to provide a stable mount for the weapon when firing.

Tripods are generally restricted to heavier weapons where the weight would be an encumbrance. For lighter weapons such as rifles, a bipod is more common. However, in recent times tripod saddles have become popular for precision rifle shooting sports, with the weapon placed in a vise-like rest which is mounted to a tripod head or with the weapon mounted directly to the tripod head.

== Photography ==
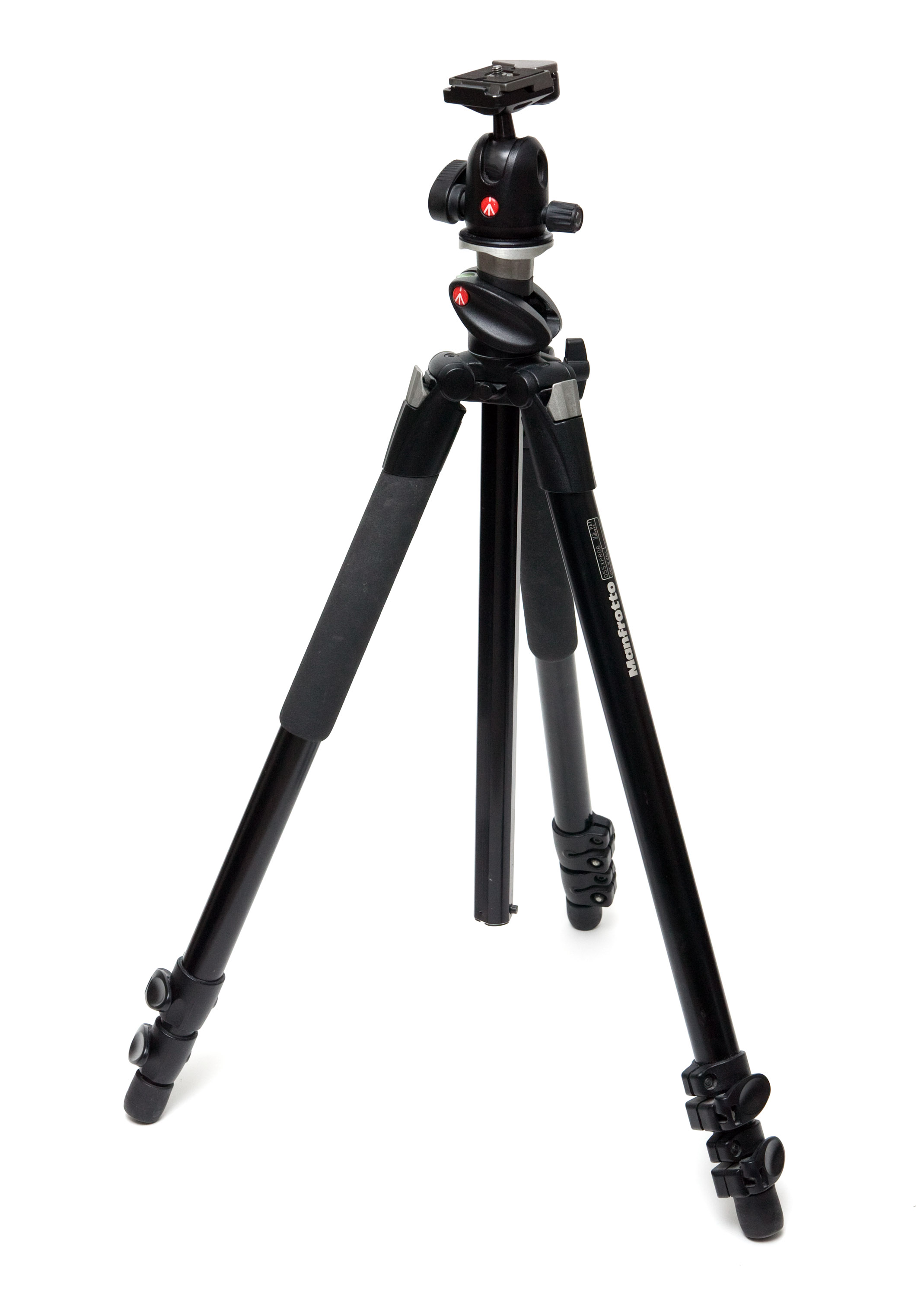
A photographic tripod

In photography, a tripod is a portable device used to support, stabilize and elevate a camera, a flash unit, or other videographic or observational/measuring equipment. Photographic tripods have three legs and a mounting head to couple with a camera. The mounting head usually includes a thumbscrew that mates to a female-threaded receptacle on the camera, as well as a mechanism to allow rotating and tilting the camera when it is mounted on the tripod. Tripod legs are usually made to telescope, in order to save space when not in use. Tripods are usually made from aluminum, carbon fiber, steel, wood or plastic.

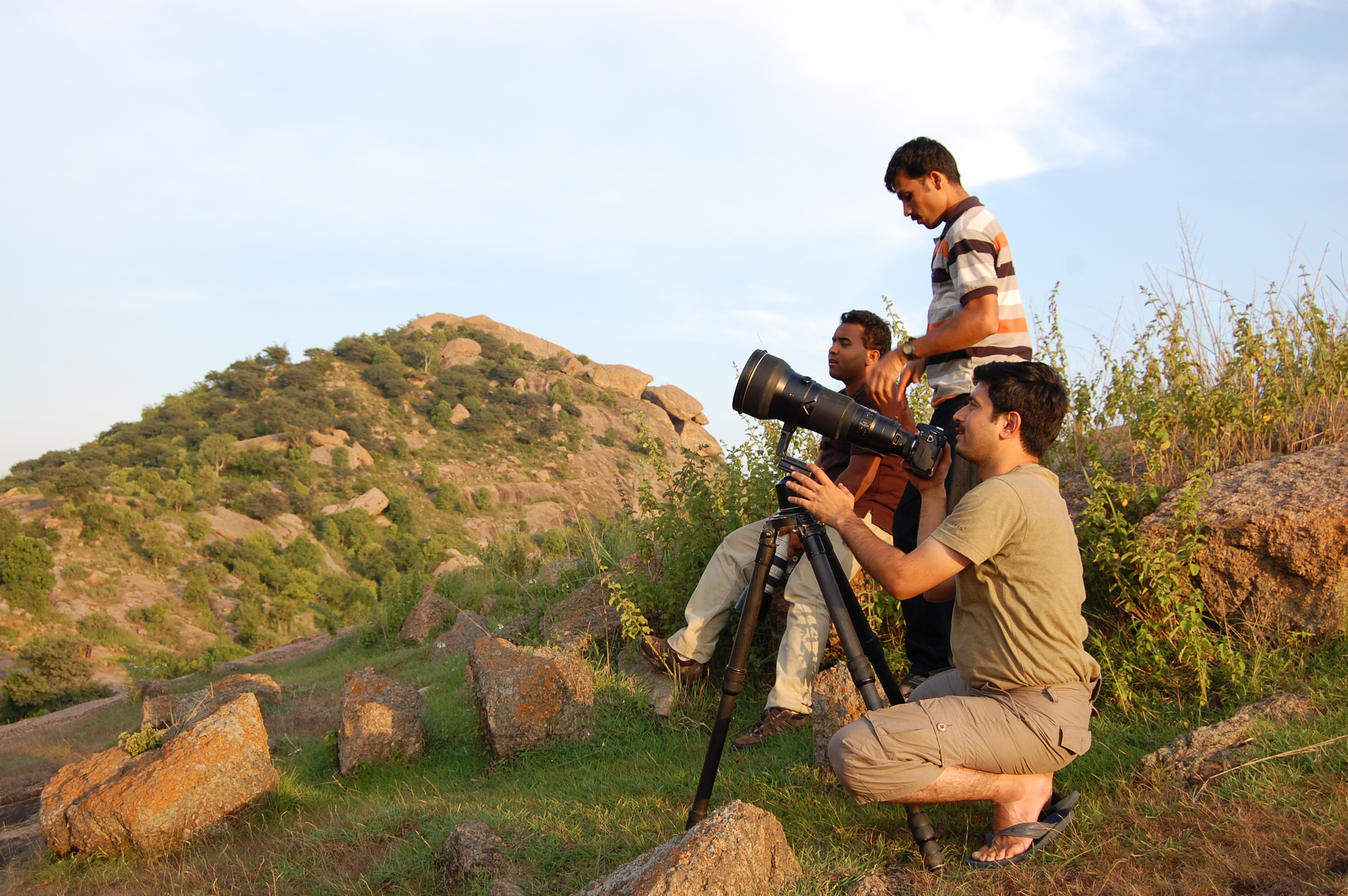
Photographers with heavy telephoto lens attachments use a tripod to stabilize their camera to get sharp images

Tripods are used for both still and motion photography to prevent camera movement. They are necessary when slow-speed exposures are being made, or when lenses of extreme focal length are used, as any camera movement while the shutter is open will produce a blurred image. They reduce camera shake, and thus are instrumental in achieving maximum sharpness. A tripod is also helpful in achieving precise framing of the image, or when more than one image is being made of the same scene, for example when bracketing the exposure. The use of a tripod may also allow for a more thoughtful approach to photography. For all of these reasons, a tripod of some sort is often necessary for professional photography. Tripods are also used as an alternative to C-Stands as photographic accessories.

== Surveying ==
A surveyor's tripod is a device used to support any one of a number of surveying instruments, such as theodolites, total stations, levels or transits.

== Astronomy ==
The astronomical tripod is a sturdy three-leg stand used to support telescopes or binoculars, though they may also be used to support attached cameras or ancillary equipment. The astronomical tripod is normally fitted with an altazimuth or equatorial mount to assist in tracking celestial bodies.

== Laboratory ==
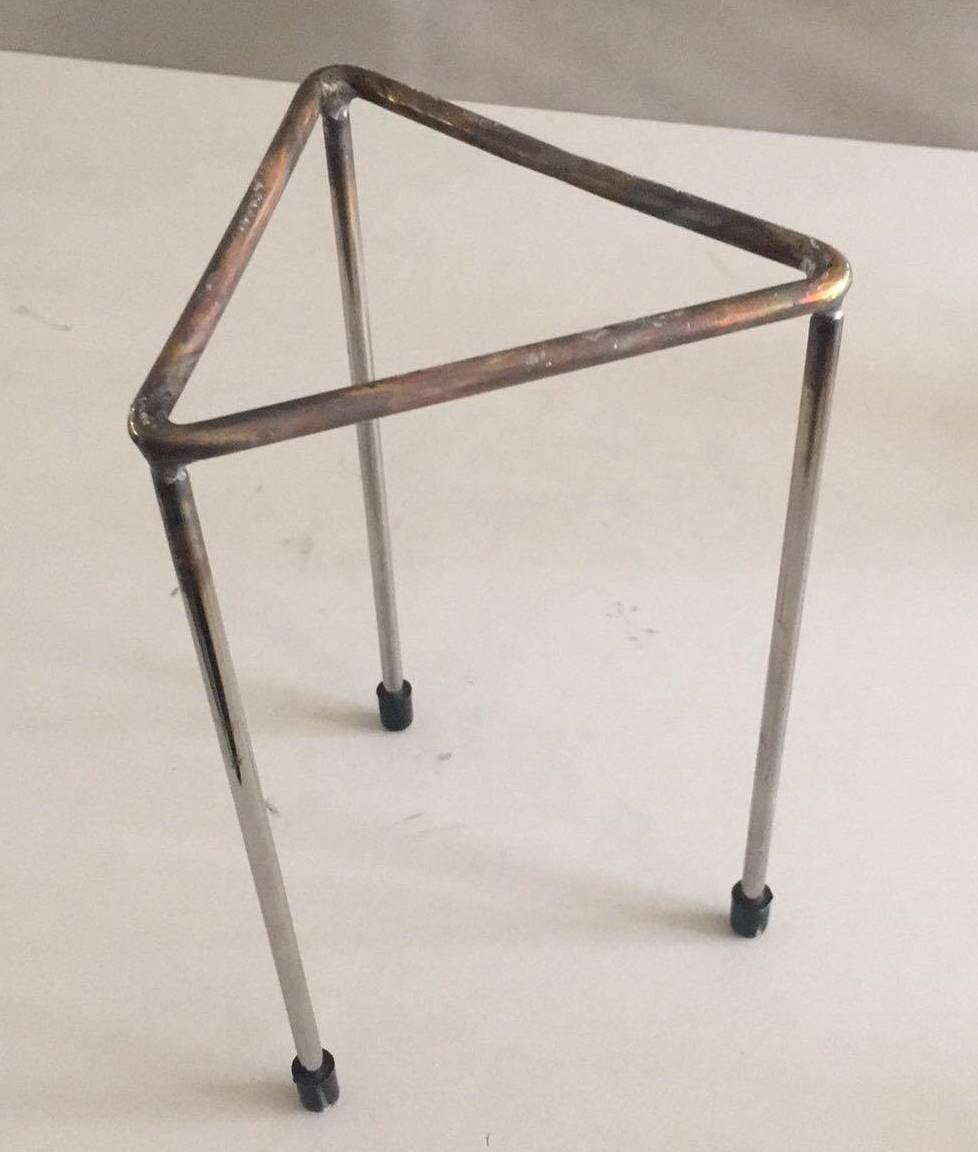
Laboratory tripod

A laboratory tripod is a three-legged platform used to support flasks and beakers. Tripods are usually made of stainless steel or aluminium and made light-weight for efficient portability within the lab. Often a wire gauze is placed on top of the tripod to provide a flat base for glassware. Tripods are generally tall enough for a bunsen burner to be placed underneath.

== See also ==
- ISO 1222 (tripod screw mount)
- Trivet
- Triskelion
