= Panning (camera) =

Swivelling a camera horizontally from a fixed position

Overview from above, looking down on the camera panning left and right of the subject

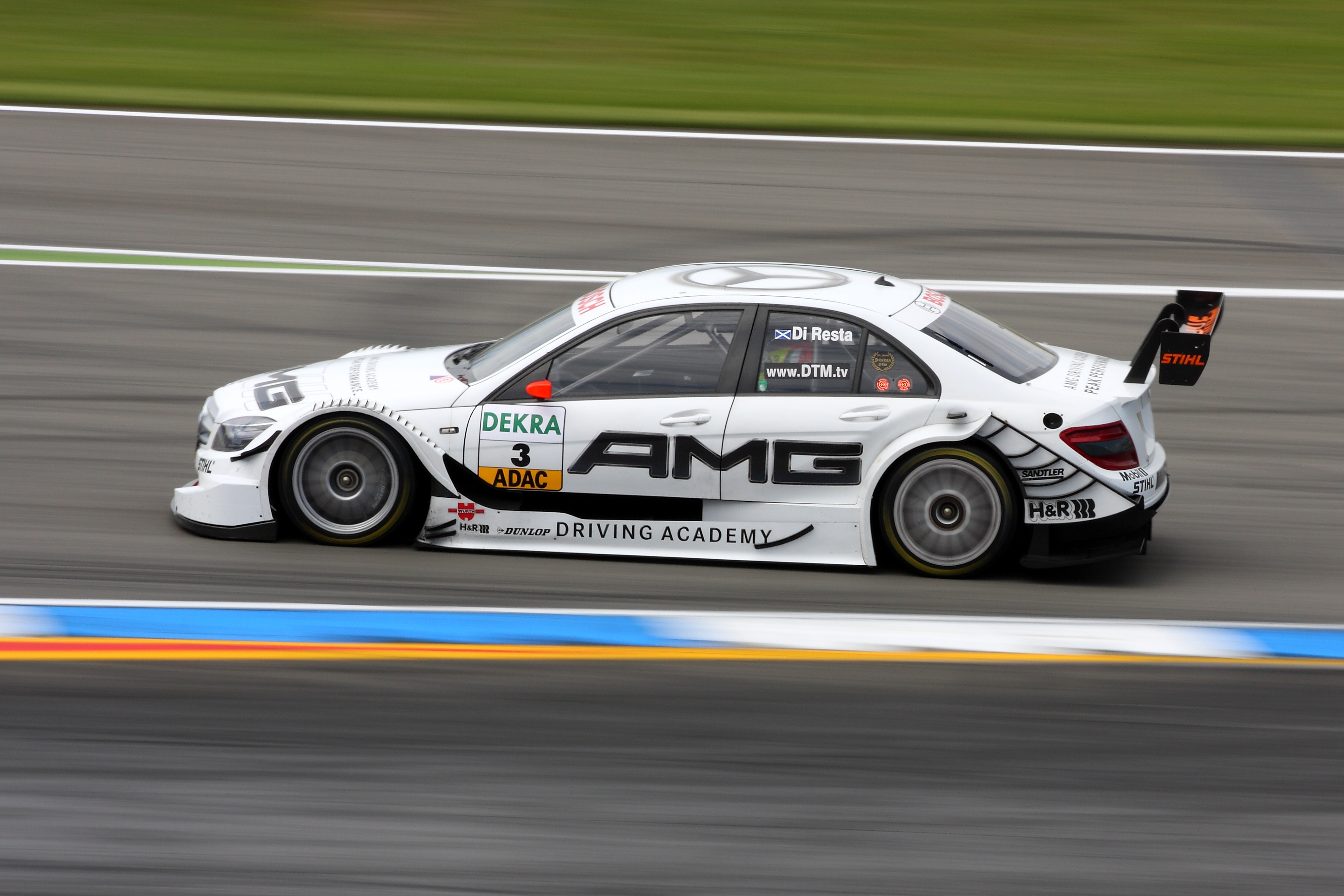
Example of a panning technique photo (shutter speed: 1/80)

In cinematography and photography, panning means swivelling a still or video camera horizontally from a fixed position. This motion is similar to the motion of a person when they turn their head on their neck from left to right. In the resulting image, the view seems to "pass by" the spectator as new material appears on one side of the screen and exits from the other, although perspective lines reveal that the entire image is seen from a fixed point of view.

The term panning is derived from panorama, suggesting an expansive view that exceeds the gaze, forcing the viewer to turn their head in order to take everything in. Panning, in other words, is a device for gradually revealing and incorporating off-screen space into the image.

== Using panning in still photography ==
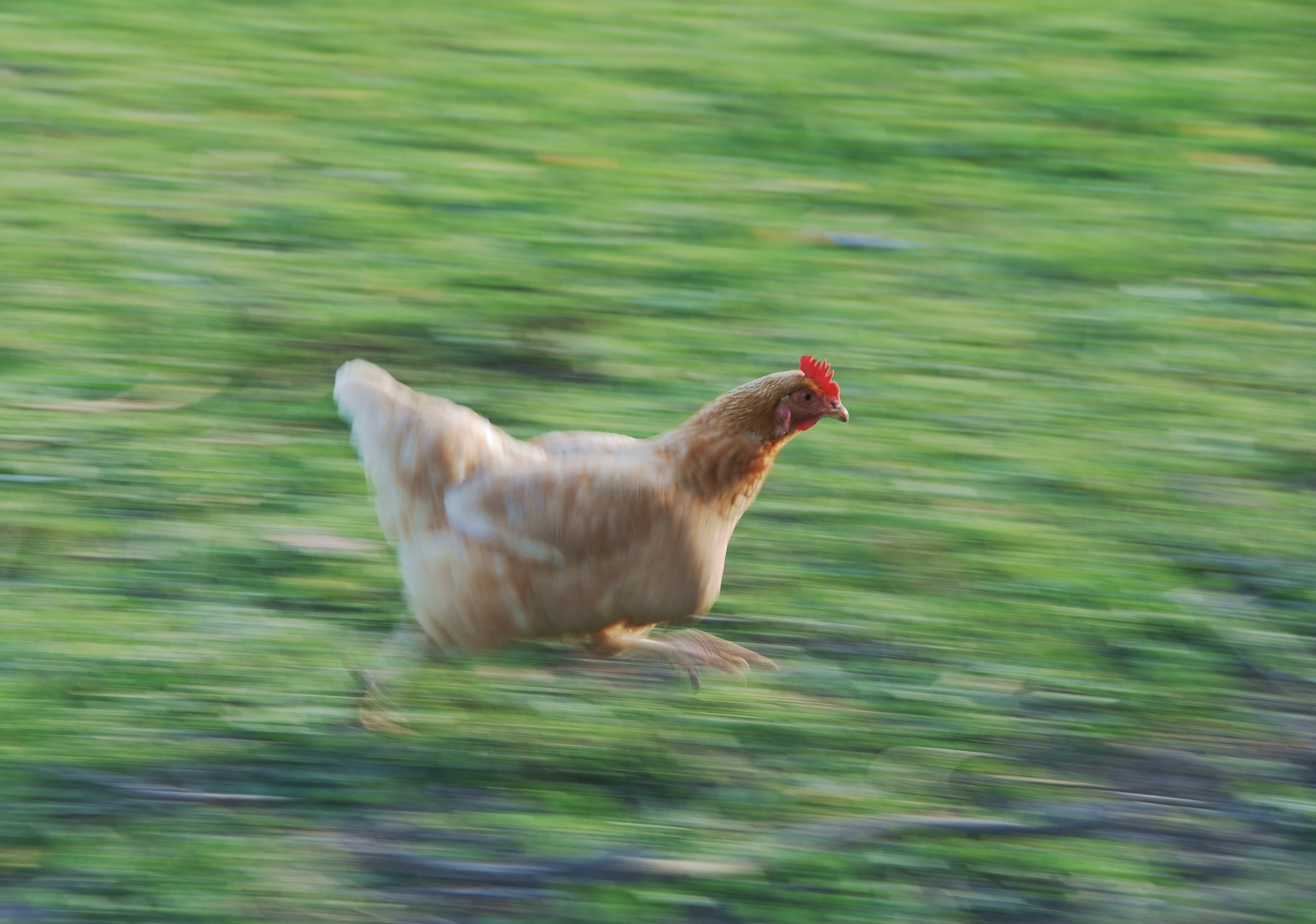
Panning shot of a chicken running, at a slow shutter speed of 1/40 second

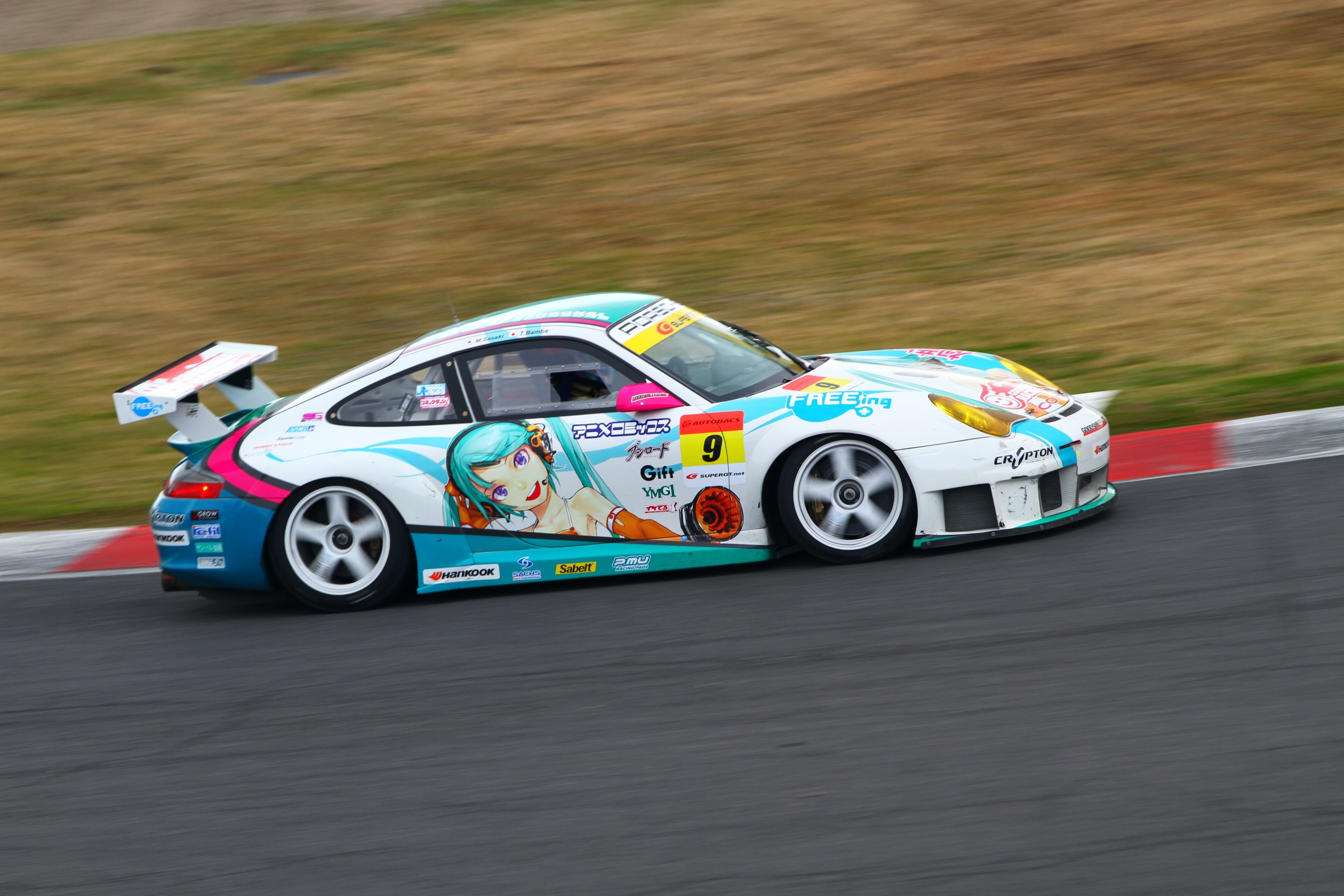
Panning of Porsche 996 GT3 RSR, shutter speed is 1/125 second

When photographing a moving subject, the panning technique is achieved by keeping the subject in the same position in the frame for the duration of the exposure. The exposure time must be long enough to allow the background to blur due to the camera movement as the photographer follows the subject in the viewfinder.

The exact length of exposure required will depend on the speed at which the subject is moving, the focal length of the lens and the distance from the subject and background. An F1 car speeding along a straight might allow the photographer to achieve a blurred background at 1/250 second, while the photographer might need to go as slow as 1/40 to achieve the same amount of blur for a picture of a running man.

The faster shutter speed allowed by fast moving subjects is easier to capture in a smoothly panned shot. With slower moving subjects, the risk is that the panning motion will be jerky, and it is also harder to keep the subject in the same position of the frame for the longer period of time.

To aid in capturing panned pictures, photographers use aids such as tripods and monopods, which make it easy to swing the camera along one plane, while keeping it steady in the others.

== See also ==
- Camera angle
- Equatorial mount which allows astronomers to take pictures of stars and galaxies by compensating for Earth's movement
- Pan and scan
- Pan–tilt–zoom camera (PTZ)
- Tilt (camera)
- Tripod (photography)
- View camera
- Zoom lens
- Yaw (rotation)
