= Monopod =

Photographic equipment

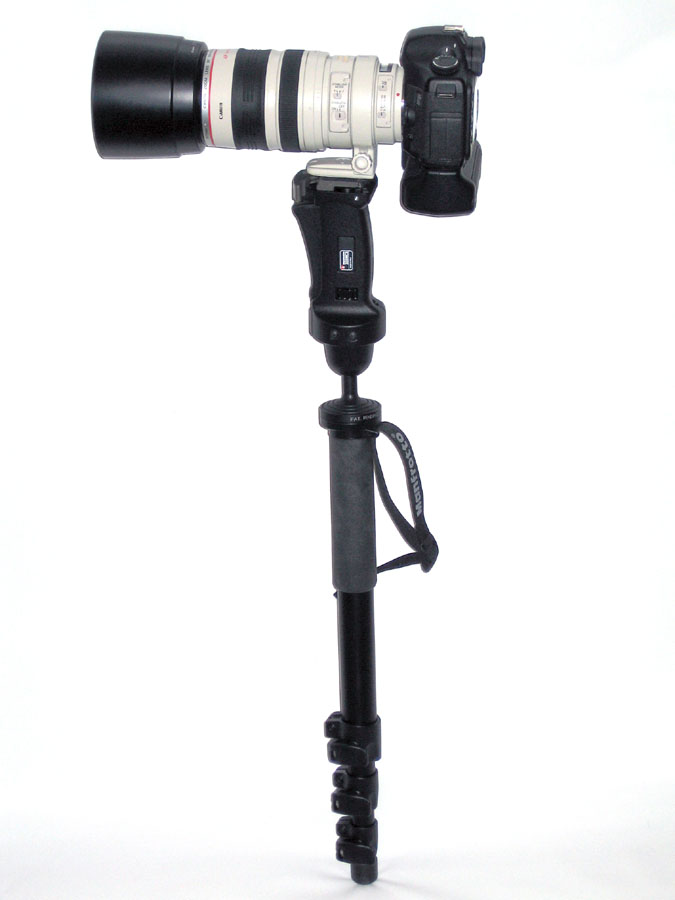
Camera and telephoto lens mounted on monopod

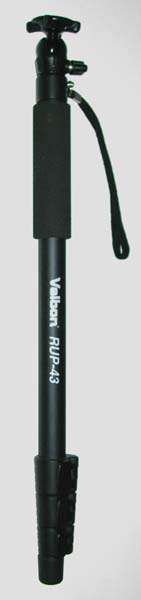
Monopod collapsed

A monopod, also called a unipod, is a single staff or pole used to help support cameras, binoculars, rifles or other precision instruments in the field.

== Camera and imaging use ==
The monopod allows a still camera to be held steadier, allowing the photographer to take sharp pictures at slower shutter speeds, and/or with longer focal length lenses. In the case of video, it reduces camera shake, and therefore most of the resulting small random movements. Monopods are easier to transport and quicker to set up than conventional tripods, making them preferable for on-the-go (OTG) photography. An OTG photographer is not able to carry a heavy, bulky tripod around, and when they see a potential shot, there is no time to bother with setting up a complicated tripod. A simple monopod is easy to carry, easy to set up, and enables the photographer to take advantage of the situation they are presented with, all while providing camera support to capture a clear, sharp image. Examples of situations in which a monopod is preferable include wildlife and sports photography where you can dramatically increase the stability of long lenses, travel photography, particularly around the golden hours, and outdoor macro photography, especially when trying to photograph insects, etc.

When used by itself, it eliminates camera shake in the vertical axis. When used in combination with leaning against a large object, a bipod is formed; this can also eliminate horizontal motion.

Unlike a tripod, monopods cannot support a camera independently. In the case of still cameras, this limits the shutter speed that can be used. They still allow longer exposures than hand holding, and are easier to carry and use than a tripod. Because it confers less stability than a tripod, monopods may present difficulties when trying to get a good image with very low light photography, i.e. night time, and shots where you need a 100% stable camera for example shooting light trails or landscapes with extreme depth of field.

Many monopods can also be used as a "beltpod," meaning that the foot of the monopod can rest on the belt or hip of the photographer. This is usually used in selfies for clearer shots by ensuring that the camera is not in motion relative to the body.

With a special adapter, monopods can be used as a "chestpod", meaning that the foot rests now on the chest of the photographer. The result is that the camera is held more steadily than by hand alone (though not as steadily as when the foot is planted on the ground), and the camera/monopod is completely mobile, travelling with the photographer's movements. This technique is widely used in videography in which the photographer has to move with the subject e.g. first-person scenes, and is also especially useful for disabled photographers.

Generally, in terms of mobility versus stability, if mobility increases, stability decreases as follows:

- Tripod or tablepod resting on a solid surface (most stable)
- Monopod on solid surface
- "Chestpod" / "Beltpod"
- Hand-held (least stable)

Monopods are often equipped with a ball swivel, allowing some freedom to pan and tilt the camera while the monopod remains relatively stationary.

Walking sticks or "trekking poles" exist that have a 1/4"-20 threaded stud on the top of the handle, usually covered by a cap when not in use, allowing them to double as a camera monopod. The user would usually need to carry a ball swivel adapter separately and mount it as needed.

Monopods used with a smartphone or camera to take selfie photographs beyond the normal reach of the arm are known as selfie sticks, and (depending on the model) may have Bluetooth connectivity.

== Ways of attaching a camera ==
There are two ways to attach your camera to a monopod. The first is to screw the monopod's screw thread directly into the camera body. This is fine if you're using a fairly small, light lens.

If you're shooting using a long, heavy telephoto lens, it's better to use a tripod mount ring. This fixes the monopod to the lens rather than the camera body, giving better balance and stopping the monopod from rotating in your hands as you try to position it.

There are various different types of monopod head available, and ball heads offer the most flexibility. They allow you to shoot in portrait or landscape orientation, and angle your camera to adjust for any sloping of the monopod.

== Binoculars ==
A finnstick is the name given by birdwatchers to a stick used to support binoculars. One end of the stick is attached or wedged between the two tubes of the binoculars while the other end rests against the user's midsection or held upright. The finnstick is especially useful when watching migration (e.g. seabirds, raptors) when the horizon may be scanned for hours to find migrant birds. As the name implies, the stick was invented in Finland, but is now also used in other countries, mainly in Europe. Alternative strategies for steadying the binoculars include supporting the arms against the body.

== Firearms ==
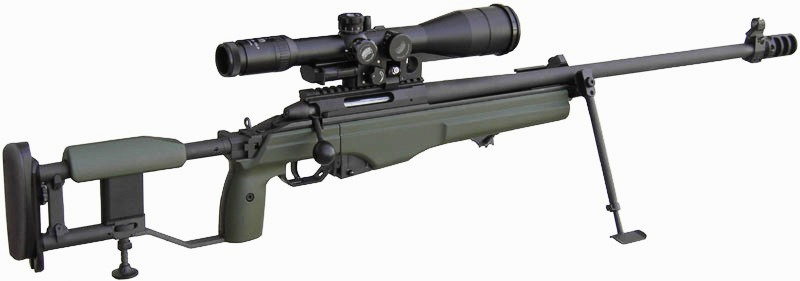
A Sako TRG sniper rifle on its standard factory monopod under the butt and its bipod.

A monopod can be used for firearms. They have the advantage of being light and compact, although when used in firing mode they can only be used with small firearms. They are also used as "butt spikes" as a rear support on precision rifles.

== Precision optical and measuring instruments ==
When used to support a compass or transit, the monopod is referred to as a jacob staff. Mounting the compass atop the jacob staff eliminates reading errors introduced by body movements, and permits the taking of more precise bearings to targets.

Monopods known as finnsticks are also used to steady high-power (typically, 10× or more) binoculars to permit a clear view without shake or wobble introduced by the user's hand and body movements. With the introduction of gyroscopically stabilized binoculars, the use of stabilizing supports for binoculars have declined in recent years.

== See also ==
- Bipod
- Tripod
