= Dailies =

Unedited film footage of a motion picture

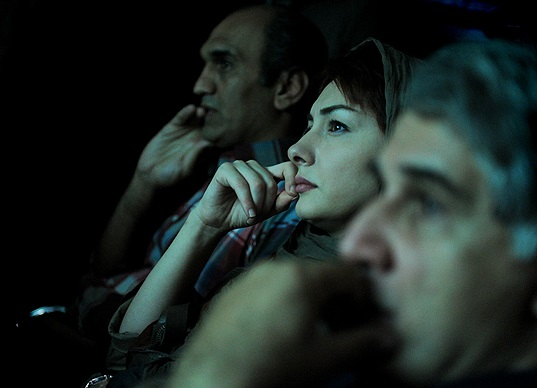
The director and an actor reviewing footage from Agha Yousef, 2011

In filmmaking, dailies or rushes are the raw, unedited footage shot during the making of a motion picture. The term "dailies" comes from when movies were all shot on film because usually at the end of each day, the footage was developed, synced to sound, and printed on film in a batch (later telecined onto videotape or disk) for viewing the next day by the director, selected actors, and film crew members. With the advent of digital filmmaking, "dailies" are now available instantly after the take and the review process is no longer tied to the overnight processing of film. Now some reviewing may be done at the shoot or even on location, and raw footage may be immediately sent electronically to anyone in the world who needs to review the takes. For example, a director may review takes from a second unit while the crew is still on location or producers can get timely updates while travelling. Dailies serve as an indication of how the filming and the actors' performances are progressing. The term was also used to describe film dailies as "the first positive prints made by the laboratory from the negative photographed on the previous day".

In some regions including the UK, India and Canada, dailies are usually referred to as rushes or daily rushes, referring to the speed at which the film prints were developed. In animation, dailies are also called rushes or sweat box sessions.

Watching film dailies may also refer to viewing dailies in a theater, usually by a group.

== Viewing ==
Dailies may be viewed by members of the film crew on a regular basis either early in the morning before filming starts, during the lunch break, or in the evening after filming ends. It is common for several members of the film crew including the director, cinematographer, editor, and others to view and discuss the dailies as a group, but some productions opt to distribute multiple copies of the dailies for individual viewing. They may be distributed via a network to individuals on set or remotely. Some filmmakers may choose to distribute dailies via a storage medium such as DVDs or USB sticks for security reasons. Individual copies may be uniquely coded or serialized to help discourage and prosecute unauthorized leaks of the material.

Viewing dailies allows the film crew to see exactly what images and audio were captured with the takes, to detect technical problems such as a dirty lens, focus issues, exposure, etc. It also presents an opportunity for the director to evaluate the actor's performances and to confirm having captured a scene from an adequate assortment of camera angles. Timely review of takes allows the director to order a reshoot if necessary while venues and talent are still available. The ability to implement timely reshoots also helps mitigate continuity issues such as weather changes in exterior shots.

Dailies are also often viewed independently of the production crew by producers, and studio executives, not engaged, day-by-day, in production but who must have assurances that the project is meeting their respective expectations as investors. Commonly, asynchronous daily sequences are repetitious, often including multiple takes of the same shot.

When production was done using film, directors and producers preferred to view dailies on film, rather than on DVD dailies. However, because of the costs involved and depending on the target quality of the film, some productions viewed dailies on DVD. With digital production, directors and others who need a high-quality viewing will simply use the highest quality viewing device available given the resolution. A high-quality viewing device makes it much easier to check for correct focus and smaller details. In the production of low-budget films with few crew and a short and uninterrupted shooting period, review of the takes may be very quick and a formal, regular group viewing of dailies may be forgone.

== Contents ==
Many films have one main film unit which does all primary filming and one or more smaller film units shooting additional "pickup" shots, stunts, or shots involving special effects. These shots are included with the main unit footage on the dailies reels. A typical pickup shot might be a simple shot of the exterior of a building that does not involve any actors and is filmed with a smaller crew to save time and money.

If a unit shoots with more than one camera usually all the shots from one "A" camera will be followed by all "B" camera shots because of the way the dailies are processed. To save time, ordinarily, only a small amount of the previous day's footage is viewed. If viewing dailies on video, often all the footage is transferred and the viewer can fast-forward as desired. Dailies on print film are more expensive to produce and cannot be easily fast-forwarded. In this case, during shooting the director will specify which takes they want converted to dailies. When a take is completed, the director yells "Cut!" and if the director wants the take converted to dailies, the director will also yell "Print". Once the director yells "Cut! Print!", the script supervisor, the camera assistant, and the sound person circle the take number on their log sheets so that only these circle takes will be printed that night by the film laboratory. The end of a daily reel may contain sound that was recorded without simultaneous picture recording called wild sound.

Visual effects shots are often assembled daily for viewing by a visual effects or animation supervisor. They will contain the previous day's work by animators and effects artists in various states of completion. Once a shot is at the point where additional feedback from the director is needed they will be assembled and screened for the director either as part of the normal dailies screening or as a separate weekly VFX dailies screening.

Dailies delivered to the editing department will usually have timecode and keycode numbers overlaid on the image. The numbers are used to later assemble the original high-quality film and audio to conform to the edit. Depending on how the dailies are produced, these numbers may only be on the editor's copy of the dailies or all copies of the dailies.

== Creation ==
During the typical filming of a motion picture, a movie camera captures the image on 35 mm film and a separate audio recorder (such as a Nagra tape recorder or digital hard disk recorder) records the sound on-set. The film negative is developed and printed or telecined so that the images can be viewed on a projector or video monitor.

The sound is synced to the film using a clapperboard as a reference. The clapperboard is labeled to identify the scene, shot, and take number for the camera. The numbers are also read aloud to label the audio recording. Once the camera and sound are rolling, a camera assistant will close the clapper creating a visual and auditory reference point. During the syncing process after the film has been developed, the technician will look at the numbers on the slate board and then match the numbers with the verbal slate. Then the technician looks for the frame where the clapper first closes and for the beep or clapping sound on the audiotape, adjusting one or the other until they happen simultaneously when played back. That needs to be done for every take. Systems exist which record synchronized timecode onto the film and audiotape at the time of shooting, allowing for automatic alignment of picture and audio. In practice, these systems are rarely used. Before computer-based editing tools became widely available in the late 1980s, all feature-film dailies were printed on film. The pieces of film are called the workprint. After viewing, the workprint is used by the film editor to edit the movie using a flatbed editor. Once the workprint is edited and approved, the negative is assembled so it is identical to the edited workprint.

Today, most editing is done on computer-based non-linear editing systems which use a video copy of the dailies. When the film is telecined, keycode numbers are logged which assign a number to each frame of film and are later used to assemble the original film to conform to the edit.

== Video or digital film ==
When using a video camera or digital motion picture camera, the image and sound are often recorded simultaneously to video tape or hard disk in a format that can be immediately viewed on a monitor, eliminating the need to undergo a conversion process to create dailies for viewing. The footage recorded each day will still usually go through a daily process to create a second copy for protection and create multiple copies on DVD or other media for viewing by producers or other people not on set.

== Other uses ==
Outside of their use in producing a motion picture, dailies are desirable by fans as a collector's item and to see more of the filmmaking process. They are also desirable to film students and teachers to illustrate how a film is shot and as a tool to practice editing. For a variety of reasons, major motion picture studios never release their dailies for outside use. A cited problem is that SAG-AFTRA has a clause in its contract to protect its actors' privacy which says that the producers of all union productions must give up their rights to the actor's performance for anything but the edited movie. In most other English-speaking countries, the actors' unions have similar contracts which limit the distribution of all film dailies. New Zealand does not have this limitation, which is why the dailies from Xena and Hercules are included on the DVDs for these shows.

Every year American Cinema Editors holds the ACE Film Editing Contest in which they make dailies available to 50 film students for an editing contest. ACE also sells a videotape with film dailies from the 1950s TV show Gunsmoke. The film dailies have been used by many film schools for the last 40 years. Rushes and dailies are used to create trailers, even if they may contain footage which is not in the final movie, or the trailer editor and the film editor may use different takes of a particular shot.

== See also ==
- Cintel
- Color grading
- Color suite
- Da Vinci Systems
- Digital film
- Direct-to-disk recording
- Film chain
- Film industry
- Film stock
- Pandora International
- Sound follower
- Spirit DataCine
- Telerecording
