= Motion picture film scanner =

Device that digitises film stock

A motion picture film scanner is a device used in digital filmmaking to scan original film for storage as high-resolution digital intermediate files.

A film scanner scans original film stock: negative or positive print or reversal/IP. Units may scan gauges from 8 mm to 70 mm (8 mm, Super 8, 9.5 mm, 16 mm, Super 16, 35 mm, Super 35, 65 mm and 70 mm) with very high resolution scanning at 2K, 4K, 8K, or 16K resolutions. (2K is approximately 2048×1080 pixels and 4K is approximately 4096×2160 pixels).

Some models of film scanner are intermittent pull-down film scanners which scan each frame individually, locked down in a pin-registered film gate, taking roughly a second per frame. Continuous-scan film scanners, where the film frames are scanned as the film is continuously moved past the imaging pick up device, are typically evolved from earlier telecine mechanisms, and can act as such at lower resolutions.

The scanner scans the film frames into a file sequence (using high-end computer data storage devices), whose single file contains a digital scan of each still frame; the preferred image file format used as output are usually Cineon, DPX, TIFF or OpenEXR (with ProRes 4444 becoming another emerging option), because they can store color information accurately and with high precision. These systems take a lot of storage area network (SAN) disk space. The files can be played back one after each other on high-end workstation non-linear editing system (NLE) or a virtual telecine systems. The playback is at the normal rate of 24 frames per second (or original projection frame rate of: 25, 30 or other speeds). Each year hard disks get larger and are able to hold more hours of movies on SAN systems. The challenge is to archive this massive amount of data on to data storage devices. The scanned footage is edited and composited on work stations then mastered back on film, see film-out and digital intermediate. Scanned film frames may also be used in digital film restoration. The film may also be projected directly on a digital projector in the theater. The data film files may be converted to SDTV (NTSC or PAL) video TV systems. Film recorders are the opposite of film scanners, copying content from a computer system onto film stock, for preservation or for display using film projectors. Telecines are similar to film scanners.

== Imaging device ==
Splitting a film image into three colours in a Spirit DataCine scanning machine, 2006

- The front end of a motion picture film scanner is similar to a telecine. The imaging system may be either a charge-coupled device (CCD), a complementary metal–oxide–semiconductor (CMOS) or photomultipliers imaging pick up.
- A lamp is used as the light source in a CCD imaging front end. The CCDs convert the light to the video signals.
- In a cathode-ray tube (CRT) imaging system the CRT (also called a Flying spot tube) is used as the light source and part of the scanning system. Photomultipliers or avalanche photodiodes are used to convert the light to electrical video signals.
- A prism and/or dichroic mirrors or color filters are used to separate the light into the three: red, green and blue, imaging pick up devices.

== Image processing ==
- The three color signals (RGB) are electronically processed and color graded. A 3D look up table (3D LUT) is usually applied to the RGB values before it is coded into the DPX output files.
- The DPX files are usually made output through a network port cable or an optical fiber port: HIPPI, Fibre Channel or newer systems like gigabit Ethernet. A computer then stores the files on to hard drives of a storage area network for later processing and use.
- Modern motion picture film scanners many have an option for an infrared CCD channel for dirt mapping, that can be used to automatically or in post manually remove dirt-dust spots on the film. The IR camera channel can be used with IR dirt and scratch removal system or made output on a four IR channel for downstream dirt and dirt and scratch removal systems. Popular downstream dirt and dirt and scratch removal systems are PF Clean and Digital ICE.
- HDR or high dynamic range is a new system, using a compositing and tone-mapping of images to extend the dynamic range beyond the native capability of the capturing device. This may be done by using a triple exposure for the film and then compositing the three back together. Compositing can be done in a workstation in none real time or in the scanner in real time.

== Models ==
Bold indicates a currently produced model

- Single frame intermittent pull-down:
  - ARRI - Arriscan
  - Cintel - diTTo
  - Filmlight - Northlight 1 (up to 6K, 16mm to VistaVision), Northlight 2 (up to 8K, 16mm to VistaVision)
  - Imagica scanner, single frame intermittent scanner.
  - Kodak - Cineon, the first system designed for DI work, included a scanner, tapes drives, workstations and a film recorder.
  - **Lasergraphics Director** 13.5K, 8mm to 70mm, IMAX & VistaVision)
- Continuous motion scanning:
  - Arri - **ARRISCAN XT** (up to 6K, S35 down to 16mm)
  - Cintel's C-Reality/DSX and ITK - Millennium/dataMill. Under ownership of Blackmagic Design, the **Cintel Scanner** was released, with the current 3rd generation capable of up to 4K scans at 30 fps.
  - DFT - Spirit Classic (up to 2K), Spirit 4k/2k/HD (up to 4K), **POLAR HQ** (up to 8K, 8mm to S35), **OXScan 14K** (up to 14K, 16mm to 70mm), **Scanity HDR** (up to 4K, 16mm to S35)
  - Filmfabriek - HDS+ (up to 4k), Pictor Pro (up to 2.7K), Pictor (up to 1080p). Filmfabriek scanners can only scan 17.5mm or smaller film formats.
  - GE4 - Golden Eye Four - Filmscanner, 38 Mega Pixel camera. LED light source and continuous film transport using Capstan. From Digital Vision.
  - **Lasergraphics ScanStation** (6.5K, 8mm to 70mm, IMAX & VistaVision)
  - **Lasergraphics Archivist** (up to 5K)
  - MWA Nova Vario series with patented laser-based, sprocket and claw free transport for 16/35mm for realtime (24/25fps) scanning with sensors for either 2K+ 2236 x 1752, or 2.5K+ HDR High Dynamic Range at 2560 x 2160, direct optical and magnetic sound on and 16 and 35mm.
  - MWA Nova Choice 2K+ patented laser-based, sprocket and claw free transport for 8/Super8, 9.5mm, 16mm realtime (24/25fps) scanning w at 2K+, 2236 x 1752 with direct optical and magnetic sound on 16mm, magnetic from main and balance stripes on 8, Super8. Faster than real time scanning at lower resolution.
  - P+S Technik - SteadyFrame Universal Format Film Scanner
  - Walde - FilmStar 4K UHD 2K @ 25fps, 4K UHD @ 6fps. 35mm/16mm/8mm archive quality, continuous motion capstan driven.

== See also ==
- Color suite
- Film scanner
- Image scanner
- Film-out
- Film recorder
- Post-production
- Television
- Hard disk recorder

== Photo gallery ==
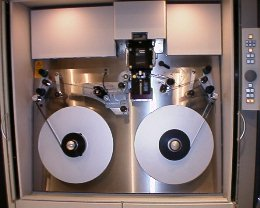
SDC-2000 Spirit DataCine Film Deck

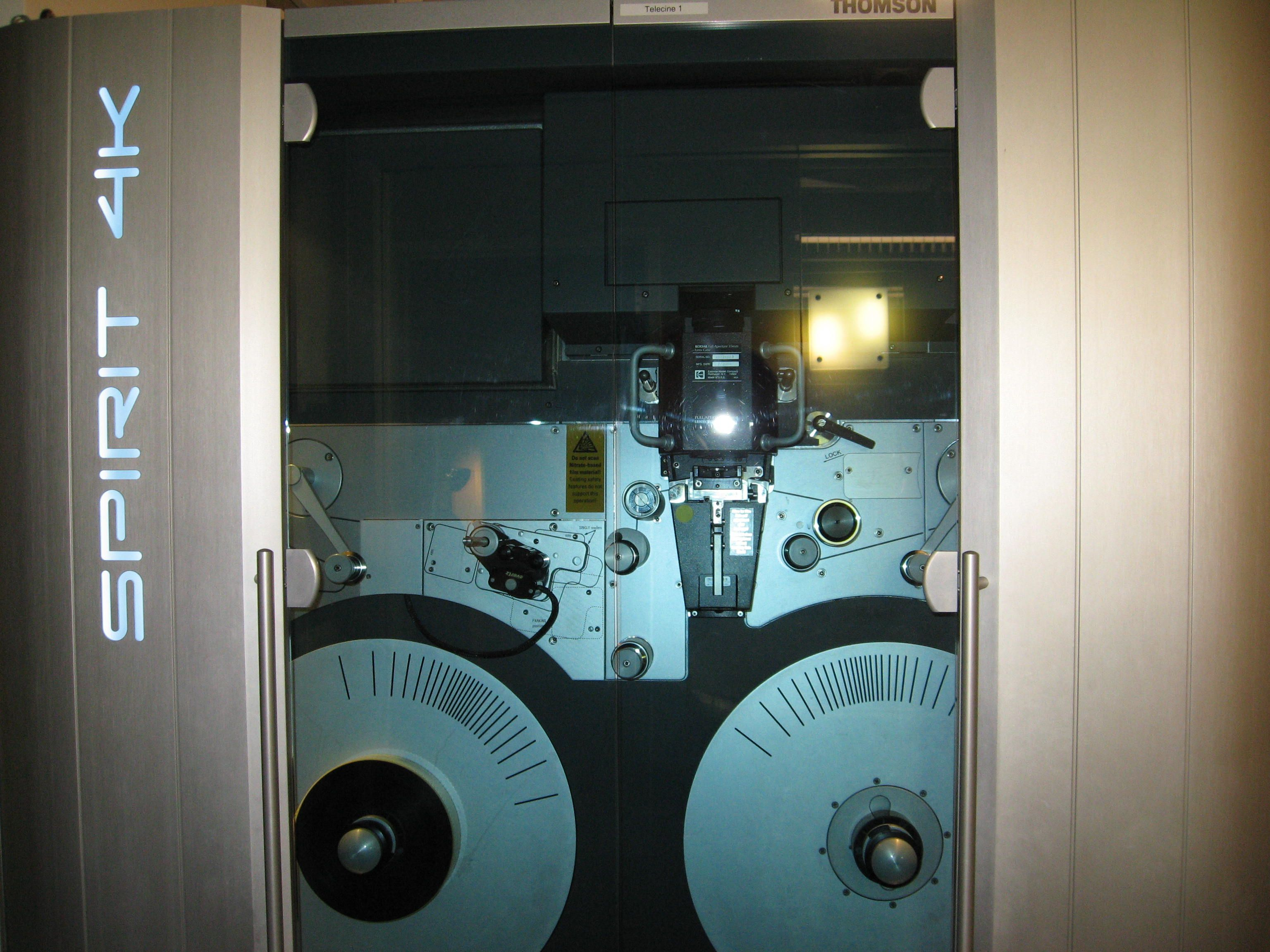
Spirit Datacine 4k with the doors closed

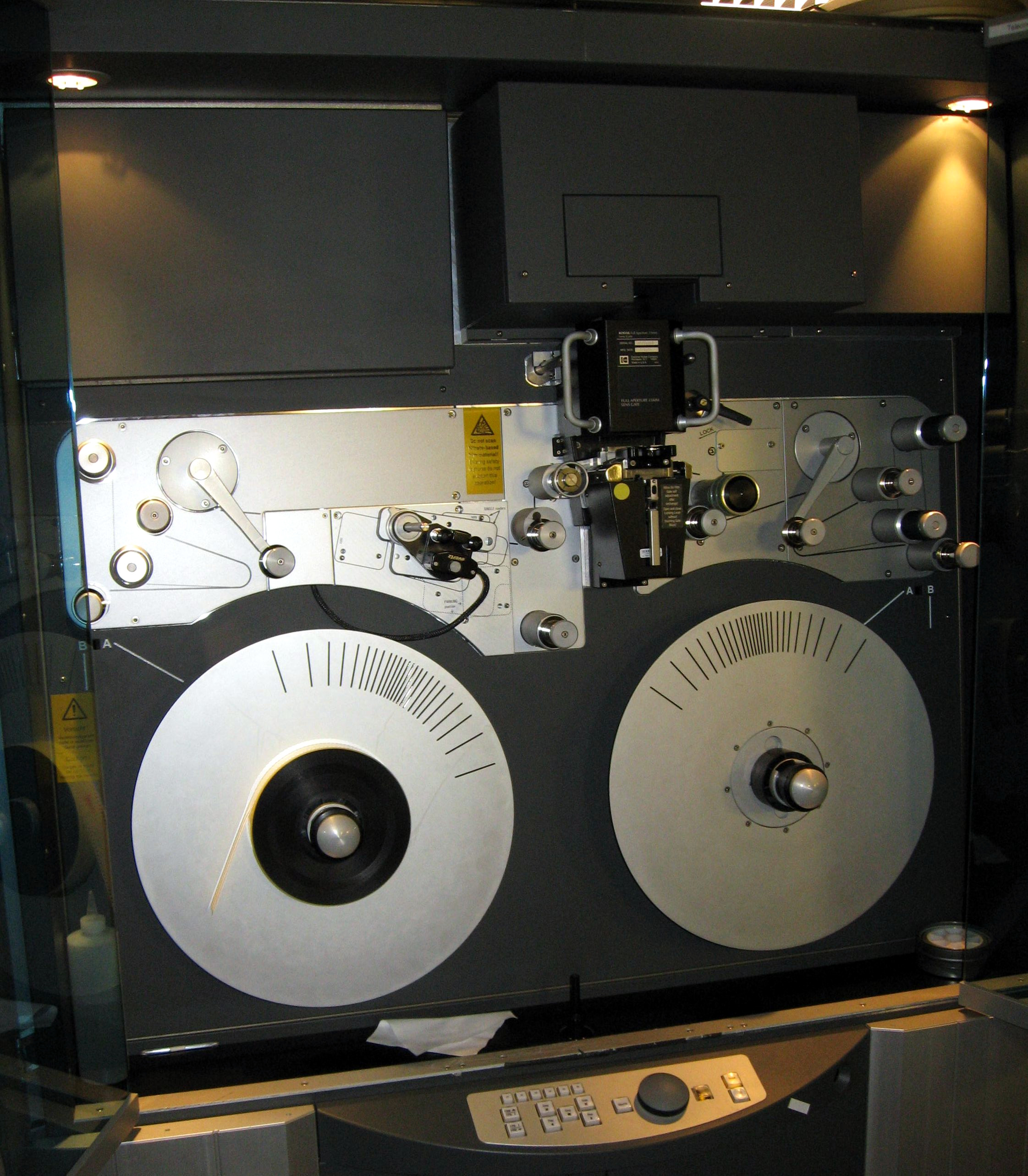
Spirit Datacine 4k with the doors open

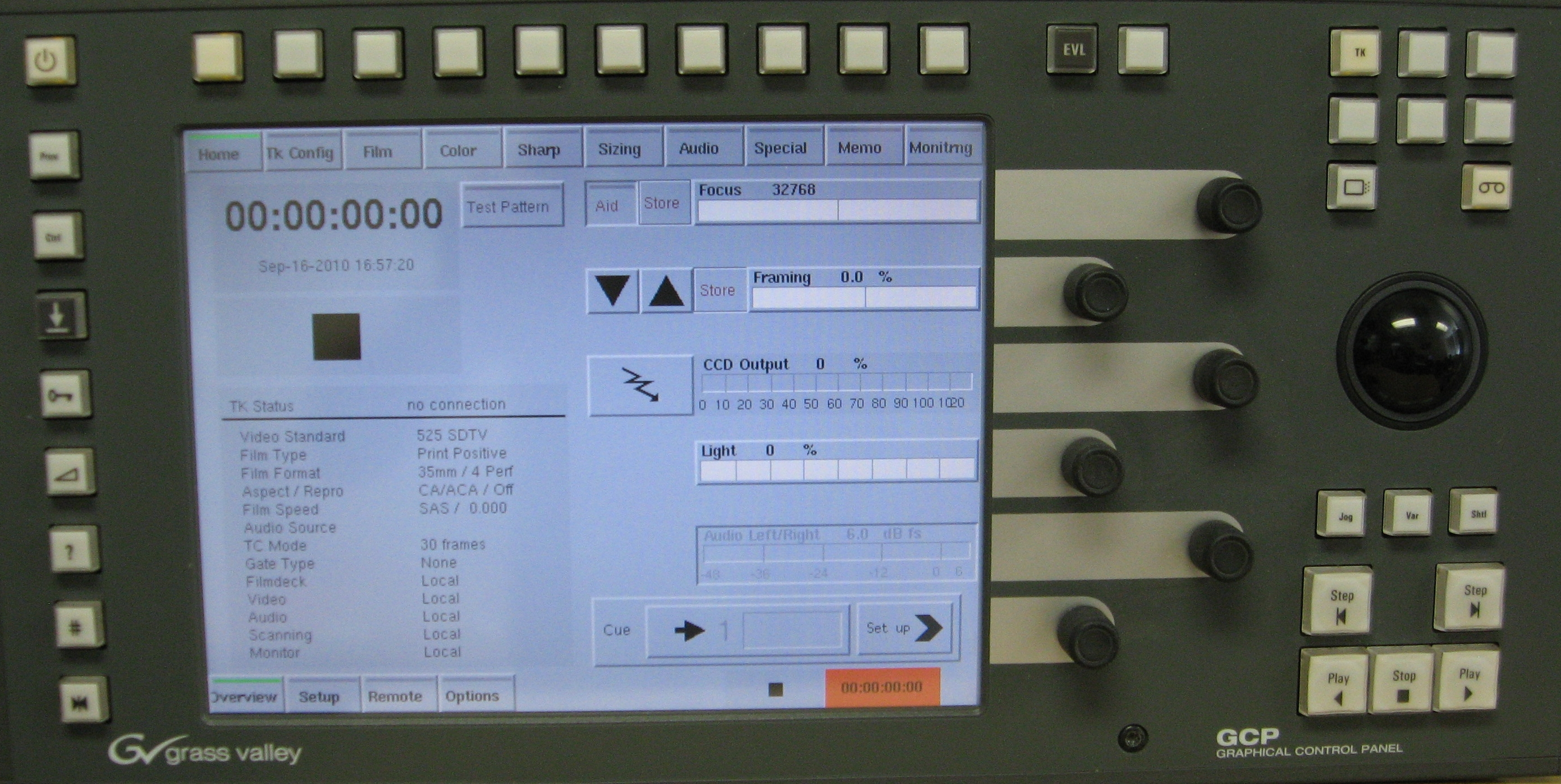
GCP for a Spirit Datacine

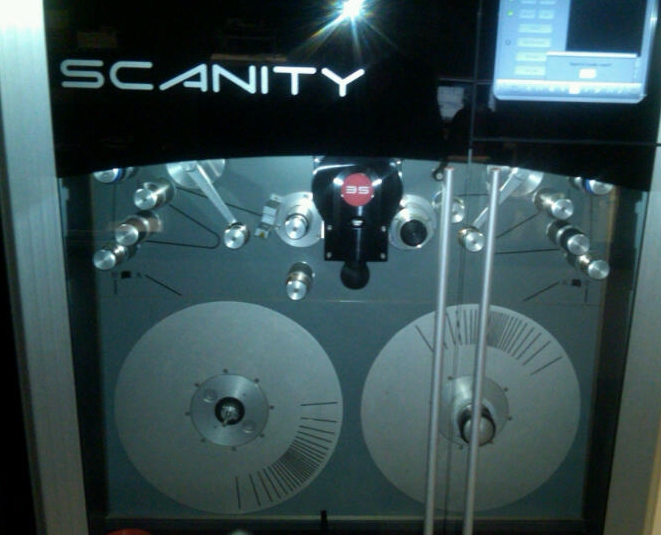
Scanity Film Deck

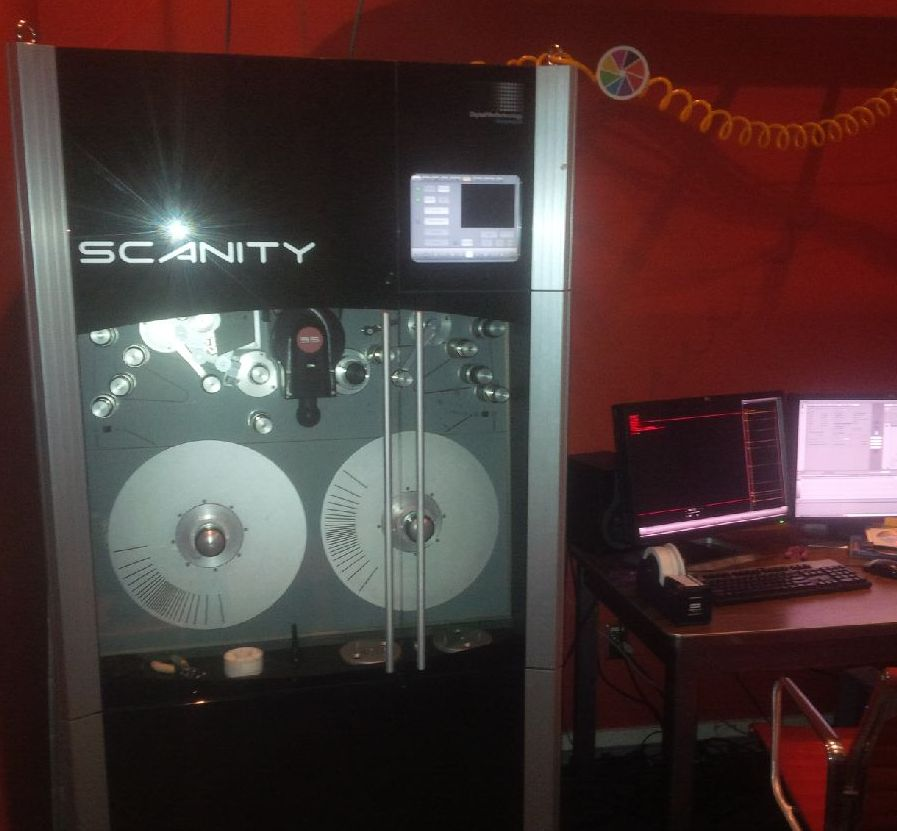
Scanity 4k and work station

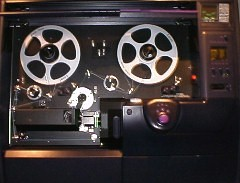
Cintel C-Reality Film Deck

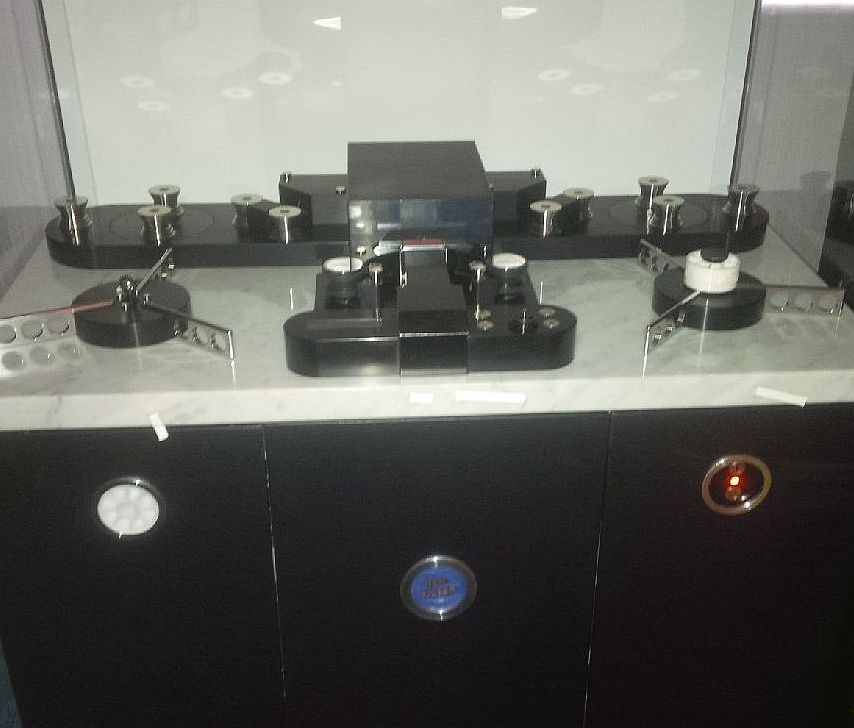
Filmlight's Northlight single frame film scanning unit

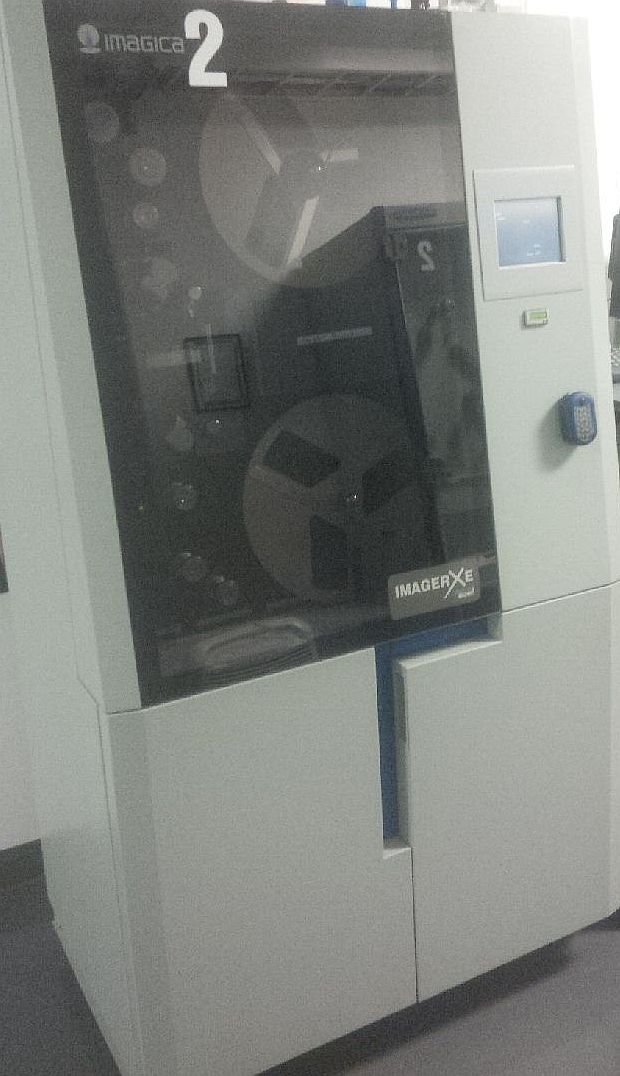
Imagica single frame film scanning unit

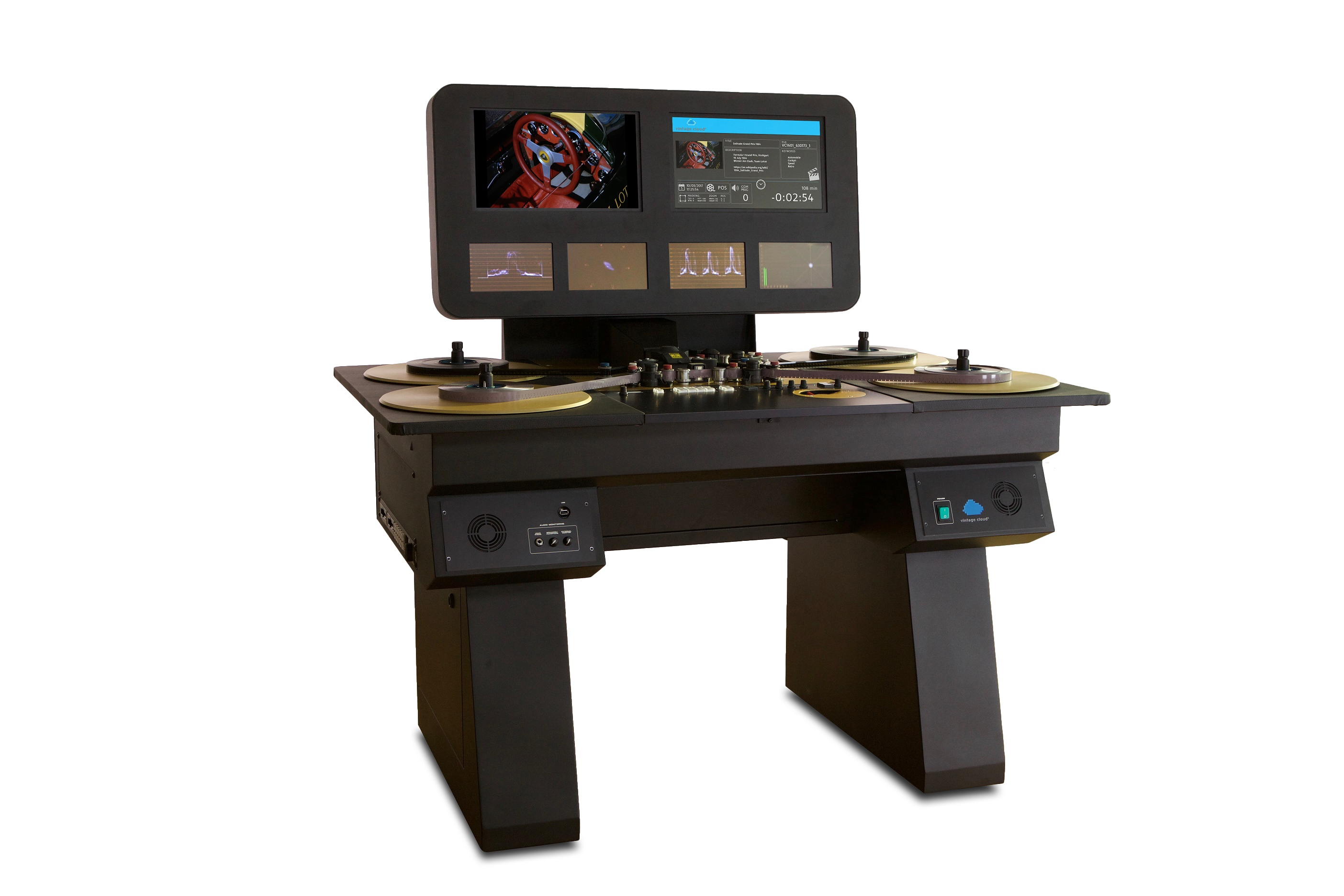
Vintage Cloud Steenbeck is the only system capable of digitizing separate image and audio at the same time at up to 4K resolution and up to 60 fps.
