= Virtual telecine =

Piece of video equipment

A virtual telecine is a piece of video equipment that can play back data files in real time. The colorist-video operator controls the virtual telecine like a normal telecine, although without controls like focus and framing. The data files can be from a Spirit DataCine, motion picture film scanner (like a Cineon), CGI animation computer, or an Acquisition professional video camera. The normal input data file standard is DPX. The output of data files are often used in digital intermediate post-production using a film recorder for film-out. The control room for the virtual telecine is called the color suite.

- The 2000 movie O Brother, Where Art Thou? was scanned with Spirit DataCine, color corrected with a VDC-2000 and a Pandora Int. Pogle Color Corrector with MegaDEF. A Kodak Lightning II film recorder was used to output the data back on to film.
- Virtual telecines are also used in film restoration.
- Another advantage of a virtual telecine is once the film is on the storage array the frames may be played over and over again without damage or dirt to the film. This would be the case for outputting to different TV standards (NTSC or PAL) or formats (pan and scan, letterboxed, or other aspect ratio). Restoration, special effect, color grading, and other changes can be applied to the data file frames before playout.

Virtual telecine is like a "tape to tape" color correction process, but with the difference of: higher resolution (2k or 4k) and the use of film restoration tools with standards-aspect ratio tools.

Virtual telecine products include the da Vinci 2k, as well as Pandora's Pogle with a MegaDef Colour Correction system.

== Real-time virtual telecines ==
- HDTV 4:2:2 and better 4:4:4 RGB can be used as a Virtual Telecine. In this case, standard HDTV video products can be used in a post-production work flow.
- As faster computers and SAN-Storage area network came on the market, more Real time 2k Virtual Telecine came on to the market. SDTV is easier to output in real time than HDTV or 2k or 4k display resolution files.
- Limitation to speed are: color correction, resizing aspect ratio, dirt removal, special effects, motion picture credits, and other restoration. Also bandwidth speed of the hardware limits real time playout: CPU, interface, SAN, memory, software and hardware.

== Non-real-time virtual telecines ==
A number of products are on the market that can output frames in less than real time. These can be used to output DPX data file, but are too slow for HDTV. For some digital intermediate work 4k data is needed. These large 4k display resolution files cannot be transferred in real time.

== See also ==
- Digital cinematography
- Direct to Disk Recording
- Fernseh
- Hard disk recorder
- Lustre (file system)
