= Sondor =

Swiss audio video equipment manufacturer

- Industry: Audio, video equipment
- Founded: 1952
- Headquarters: Zollikon, Switzerland

Sondor Telecine

Sondor is a manufacturer of Audio Video equipment located in Zollikon, Switzerland until 2017. Sondor was founded in 1952 by Willy Hungerbuehler. Sondor started as a manufacturer of 16 mm film and 35mm film magnetic film equipment. They are noted as inventing the standard for bi-phase interlocking pulse signals to sync sound to film. Sondor added a film transport telecine to it line of film sound equipment. Sondor products are found in many in post-production studios for record and playback and in movie theater for sound playback. playback.

Sondor film transport telecines uses a spinning prism telecine, like the model NOVA and ALTRA.

Some Sound Film followers player-recorder are the: OMA E and BASIC. SOUNDHOUSE is a product to add sound pick up to other telecines, like the Spirit DataCine.

The other major maker of sound followers is Magna Tech. Direct to disk recording has replaced much of the work done on separate film sound followers.

On December 9, 2016 Digital Film Technology (dft), completed the acquisition of Sondor. DFT is the maker of the Scanity film scanner.

Current Sondor products:

- Versa, telecine-scanner, optical sound scan: and Magnetic sound scan
- Resonances, optical soundtrack

== See also ==
- Film chain
- Digital film
- Digital cinema
- Hard disk recorder
- Factors causing HDTV Blur
- Color grading and editing systems
- Cintel telecine equipment
- Color suite
- Dolby
- For means of putting video on film, see telerecording (UK) and kinescope (US).
