= Spirit DataCine =

Motion picture film scanner

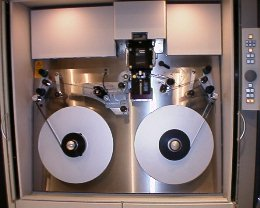
SDC 2000 Spirit DataCine Film Deck, Lens Gate and Local Control Panel

Spirit DataCine is a telecine and a motion picture film scanner. This device is able to transfer 16mm and 35mm motion picture film to NTSC or PAL television standards or one of many High-definition television standards. With the data transfer option a Spirit DataCine can output DPX data files. The Spirit DataCine is made by DFT Digital Film Technology GmbH in Darmstadt, Germany.

The operator of the unit is called a Colorist or Colorist Assistant. The Spirit DataCine has become the standard for high-end real-time film transfer and scanning. Over 370 units are used in post-production facilities around the world. Most current film productions are transferred on Spirit DataCines for television, digital television, cable television, satellite television, direct-to-video, DVD, Blu-ray Disc, pay-per-view, in-flight entertainment, stock footage, dailies, film preservation, digital intermediates, and digital cinema.

The Spirit DataCine opened the door to the technology of digital intermediates, wherein telecine tools were not just used for video outputs, but could now be used for high-resolution data that would later be recorded back out to film. The DFT Digital Film Technology, formerly Grass Valley Spirit 4K/2K/HD (2004) replaced the Spirit 2000 Datacine and uses both 2K and 4k line array CCDs. The SDC 2000 did not use color prisms and/or dichroic mirrors, color separation was done in the CCD. DFT revealed its newest scanner at the 2009 NAB Show, Scanity.

A Spirit DataCine outputting DPX files was used in the 2000 film O Brother, Where Art Thou?. The DPX files were color corrected with a VDC-2000 and a Pandora Int. Pogle Color Corrector with MegaDEF. A Kodak Lightning II film recorder was used to put the data output to back to film. To output the movie the Spirit Datacine's Phantom Transfer Engine software running on an SGI computer is used to record the DPX files from the Spirit DataCine. These files are stored in the virtual telecine or on a SAN hard disk storage array. The Phantom Transfer Engine has been replaced with Bones software running on a Linux-based PC. First generation of DPX interface for data files was the optical fiber HIPPI cables (up to 6 frame/s at 2K), the next generation interface is GSN-Gigabit Ethernet fiber Optic (up to 30 frame/s at 2K). GSN is also called HIPPI-6400 and was later renamed GSN (for Gigabyte System Network). The SAN hard disks are interfaces to by dual FC-Fibre Channel, cables. The newest DPX output interface is infiniband.

Most Spirit DataCines are controlled by a Da Vinci Systems color corrector, 2K or 2K Plus. Some are controlled by Pandora International Pogle, some with a their MegaDEF or a Pixi color grading system. A Spirit DataCine comes with a full function control panel that can be used for control and color grade.

The DVD release of Ken Burns' series The Civil War included a short documentary on how a Spirit DataCine was used to transfer and remaster the film.

== Function ==
The parts of a CCD scanner, like a FDL, Quadra, Shadow and SDC 2k-4k: (A) light source; (B) film plane; (C) & (D) prisms and/or dichroic mirrors; (E),(F) & (G) red-, green- and blue-sensitive CCDs.

Spirit DataCines use a charge-coupled device Line Array – CCD for imaging. In print mode a “white” light is shone through the exposed film image into a lens and then to prism, color glass separates out the image into the three primary colors, red, green and blue. Each beam of colored light is then projected at a different CCD, one for each color. The CCD converts the light into an electrical signal that produces a modulated video signal which is color corrected and sized so it can then be recorded onto video tape or a storage area network (SAN) hard disk array. Spirit DataCines can output to different TV standards: (NTSC or PAL) or HDTV. The Spatial Processor can change the size of the image: pan and scan, letterbox or make other aspect ratio and rotation changes, also product interlaced video if needed. The Spatial Processor also produces the 2:3 pulldown, if needed for the format. An optional Scream grain reducer can reduce film grain in all three color channels.

The image pick up device is a solid state charge-coupled device. This eliminated the need for glass vacuum tube CRTs used on older telecines. The units can transfer negative film, primetime, intermediate film and print film, stock. One option is a Super 8 gate for the transfer of Super 8 mm film. With a sound pick up option, optical 16mm and 35mm sound can be reproduced, also 16mm magnetic strip sound. The unit can operate stand alone or be controlled by a scene by scene color corrector.

All Spirit DataCines use continuous transport motion, using a capstan and constant film tension. An optional optical audio pick up system can be mounted in the capstan. All Spirit DataCines use a xenon lamp for illumination into a diffusion chamber to minimize dust and scratch visibility. With the standard 35mm lens gate: super 35 mm and academy 35 mm are supported. Also 2, 3, 4, perf are supported. VistaVision 8-perf and 6 perf are an option. The unit comes with select-a-speed, this gives the section of a film speeds from 2.00 frames per second to 57.00 fps in SDTV and 2.00 to 31.00 fps in HDTV interlace format. With the optional 16mm lens gate standard 16mm and Super 16 mm are supported. With the 16mm lens gate an optional Super 8 mm film gate can be added. 16mm audio system also support 16mm mag or magnetic strip sound track on the motion picture would be picked up by a head and could be fed to an audio sound mixing console or to the VTR.

== Background and history ==
=== FDL 60 ===
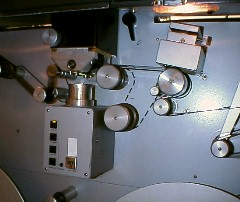
Bosch FDL 60 Telecine Film Deck and Lens Gate

The Robert Bosch GmbH, Fernseh Div., which later became BTS inc. – Philips Digital Video Systems, Thomson's Grass Valley and now is DFT Digital Film Technology introduced the world's first CCD telecine in 1979, the FDL-60. The FDL-60 was designed and made in Darmstadt West Germany, this was the first all solid state Telecine. FDL is short for Film Digital Line. The FDL-60 uses a three CCD single-line array system, whereby three lines, Red Green Blue (RGB) each with 1,024 pixels per line to record a single line of the film image. FDL60A uses three Fairchild Semiconductor CCD 133 CCDs for the image pickup. FDL60A released in 1979 used a 115 Volt lamp to light the film. The FDL60B released in 1982 added improved video quality features to the FDL60. The FDL60C released in 1987 used a Fairchild CCD 134 and a 24 volt light source. In 1983 an optional Grain Reduce was introduced by Bosch for the FDL-60, model FDGR 60. This was the first all digital noise reducer. The FDL 60 could operate stand alone or with a color grade system. Bosch made a scene by scene color corrector, model FRP 60, as an option for the FDL-60. Da Vinci Systems also made the Wiz color corrector for the FD60. About 568 FDL-60 telecines were manufactured from 1979 to 1989. FDL 60 were ordered in PAL or NTSC or Secam, a few were multi standard by changing a few electronic circuit cards.

=== FDL 90 and Quadra ===
Philips-BTS eventually evolved the FDL 60 into the FDL 90 in 1989 and then updated to the Quadra in 1993. These units were able to support super 35mm, super 16mm and super 8. The units were able to zoom and position the picture. The units outputted 4:4:4 digital video to feed a color corrector like the Da Vinci Systems 888. The units also had an optional analog output. The film path was similar to the Spirit Datacine, but this was the only similarity. FDL 90 and Quadra used three Fairchild CCD 181 CCDs. Both had an optional Pal/NTSC switchable option. Both were 3/4 perf switchable. Many FDL-90 were updated to have the Quadra electronic circuit cards improvements. A true Quadra had a new capstan position closer to the film gate and with a blue color deck.

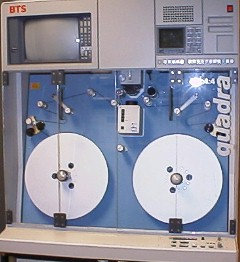
BTS Quadra Telecine Film Deck, Lens Gate and Local Control Panel

A line of stand alone SDTV Noise/Grain Reducers were made for use on the FDL 90, later telecines and tape to tape use, models: DNR7, MNR9, MNR10, MNR11 and the VS4.

=== FLH 1000 ===
In 1994 the FLH-1000 was demonstrated by BTS inc. This unit was never released for sale. This was the first HDTV telecine. The FLH-1000 was improved – redesigned and released as the SDC 2000 – Spirit DataCine. The Scanning system and CCDs were made by Kodak in New York. FLH-1000 and Spirit DataCine were a joint effort between Philips and Eastman Kodak. Beta sites for the FLH-1000 were: Producers Color in Detroit and Channel 4 in London.

=== SDC 2000 Spirit DataCine ===
In 1996 Philips, working with Kodak, introduced the Spirit DataCine (SDC 2000), which was capable of scanning the film image at HDTV resolutions and approaching 2K (1920 Luminance and 960 Chrominace RGB) x 1556 RGB. The SDC 2000 Spirit DataCine uses two physical CCD, one for Chrominace and one for Detail/Luminance. The unit used two CCDs for improved Signal to Noise ratio. The chroma CCD gave the unit high signal to noise ratio and the Luminance CCD gave the unit its high bandwidth. Inside the Luminance CCD are 4 electrical CCDs. In side the Chrominace are 3 electrical CCDs: red, green and blue. With the data option the Spirit DataCine can be used as a motion picture film scanner outputting 2K DPX data files as 2048 x 1556 RGB. The normal input data file standard is DPX. The data files are often used in DI – digital intermediate post-production using a film recorder for film-out. The control room for the telecine is called the color suite or sometimes a color bay. In a two years time span the Spirit DataCine took over the number one spot of telecines from Rank Cintel.

- The 1998 movie Pleasantville was the first digital intermediate film scanned on a Spirit DataCine. This process produced the mix of B&W and color pictures. A movie released in 2000, O Brother, Where Art Thou? was scanned with Spirit Datacine, color corrected with a VDC-2000 using a Pandora Int. Pogle Color Corrector with MegaDEF. A Kodak Lightning II film recorder was used to put the data output back to film. This process changed the greens to a green-yellow color for the complete film.

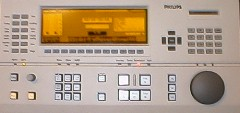
SDC 2000 Spirit DataCine functional control panel

=== Specter – VDC – Virtual DataCine ===
In 1999 Philips introduces the VDC-2000-Specter the first virtual telecine. It is able to color correct, re-size and grain reduce 2K DPX files in real time. Used in DI work and to make multiple video formats off one film transfer scan (HDTV, PAL, NTSC, Pan scan, letter box...). This was accomplished by playing the DPX files back through the Spirit Datacine's process electronics and a Pandora International's MegaDef Colour Correction system. This allowed the film to be scanned only once for all needed formats or be used on DI workflow.

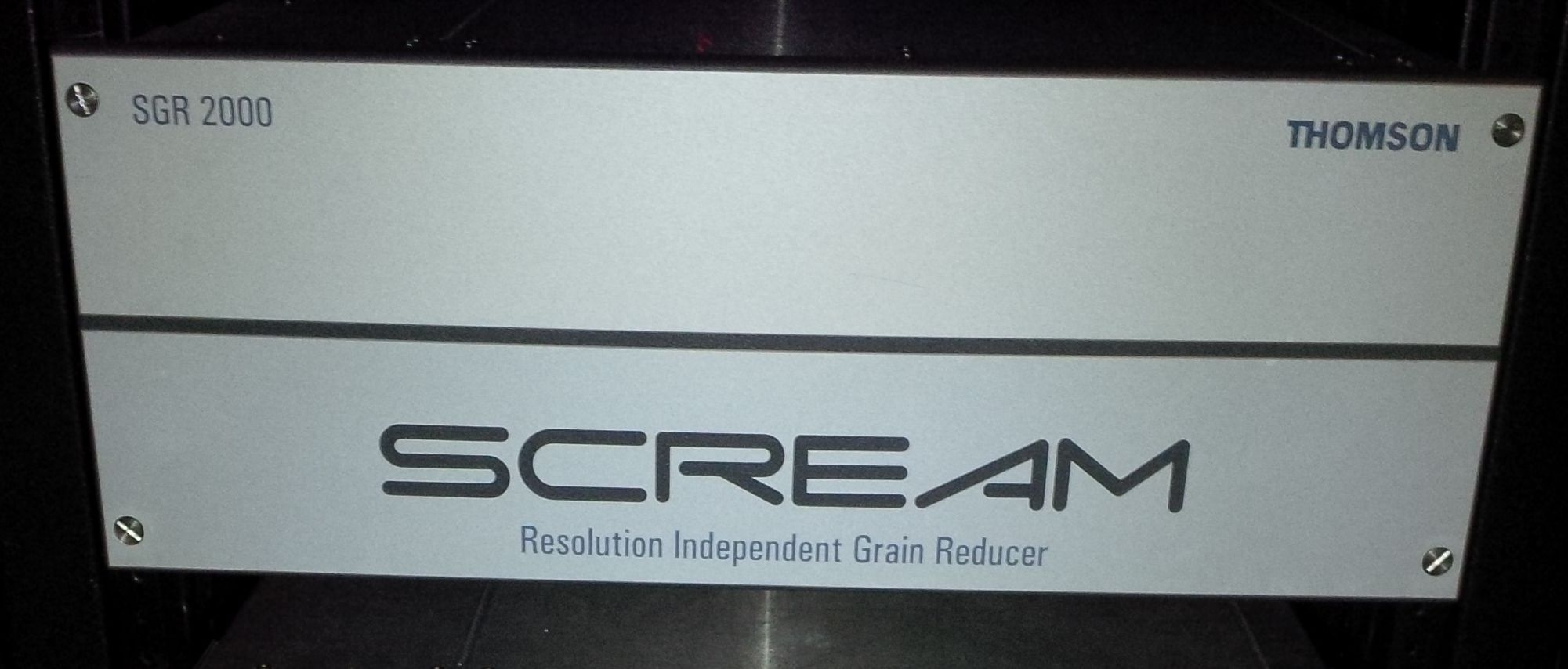
Scream film grain reducer a resolution independent three channel RGB grain reducer

=== SDC 2001 Spirit DataCine ===
In 1999 the SDC 2001 replaced the SDC 2000, the SDC 2001 had the addition of an optional 6 vector resolution independent color corrector. An optional RGB resolution independent film grain reducer also became available for both the SDC 2000 and SDCs 2001 called the Scream film grain reducer. Scream film grain reducer is a resolution independent three channel RGB grain reducer. Scream can be used on the Spirit DataCine and the VDC. Also in 2000 the first D6 HDTV VTR is shown.

=== Shadow ===
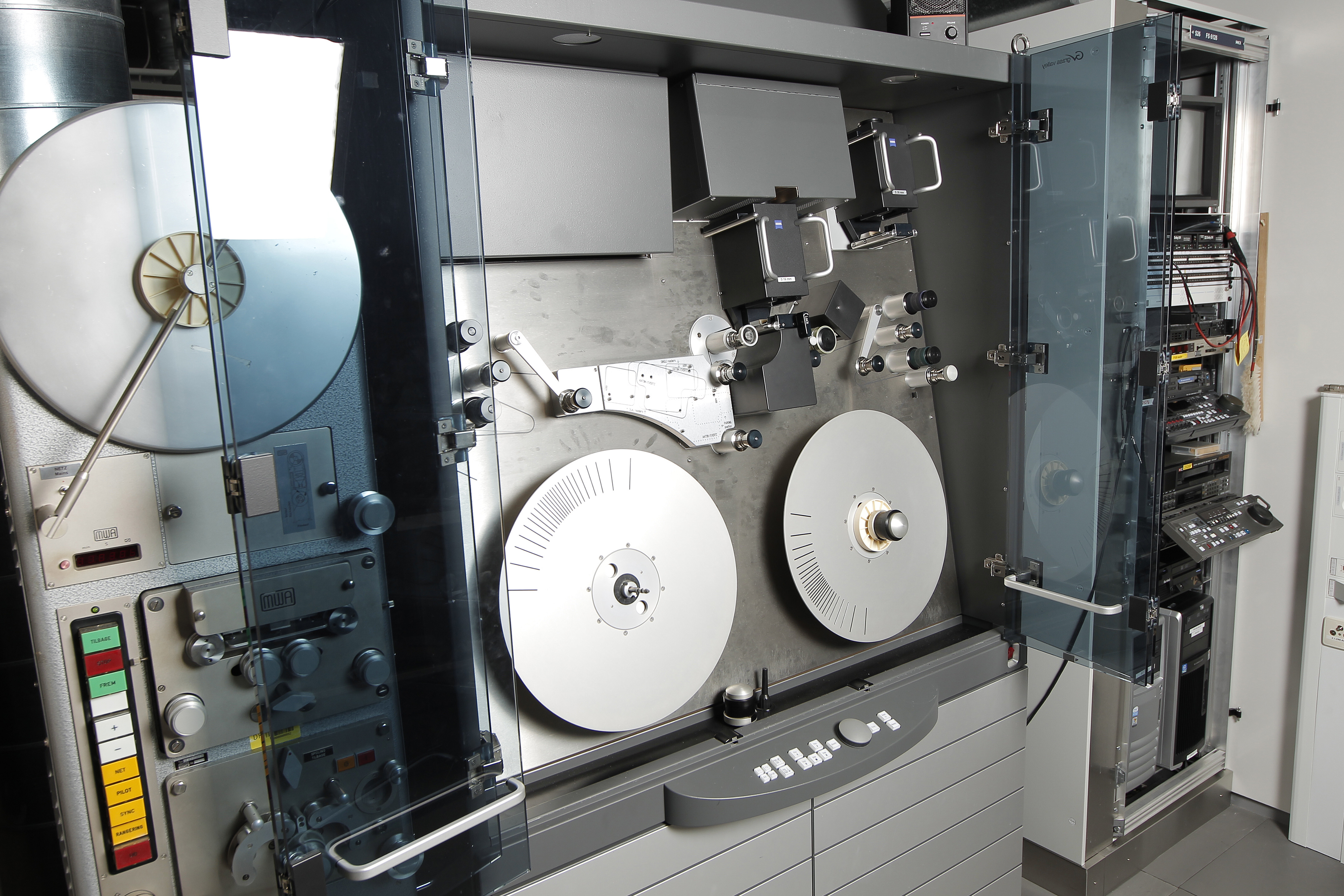
Shadow telecine

In 2000 the Shadow telecine was demonstrated by Philips. The Shadow (STE) is a Spirit DataCine without a Kodak front end (lens, optics and CCDs). This made for lower cost telecine transfers, good for SDTV and HDTV.

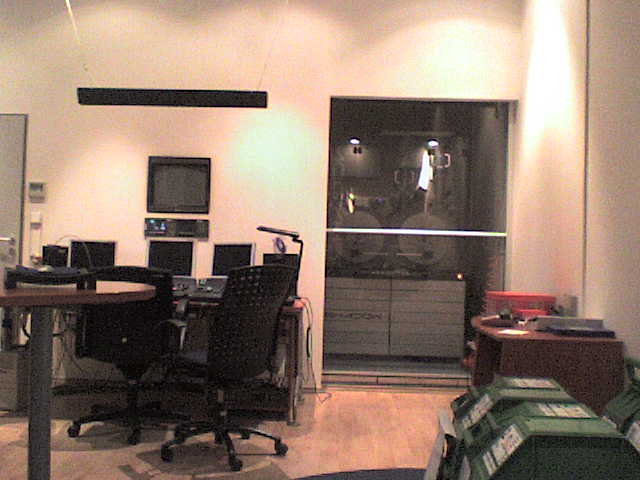
A Shadow Telecine in a color correction suite

=== SDC 2002 Spirit DataCine ===
In 2003 the SDC 2002 replaced the SDC 2001, the SDC 2002 had the addition of being GSN data output ready. Data interface, GSN-Gigabit Ethernet fiber Optic has speeds up to 30 frame/s at 2K. Also a Color Graphical Control (GCP) panel now came standard and replaced the monochrome functional control panel (FCP).

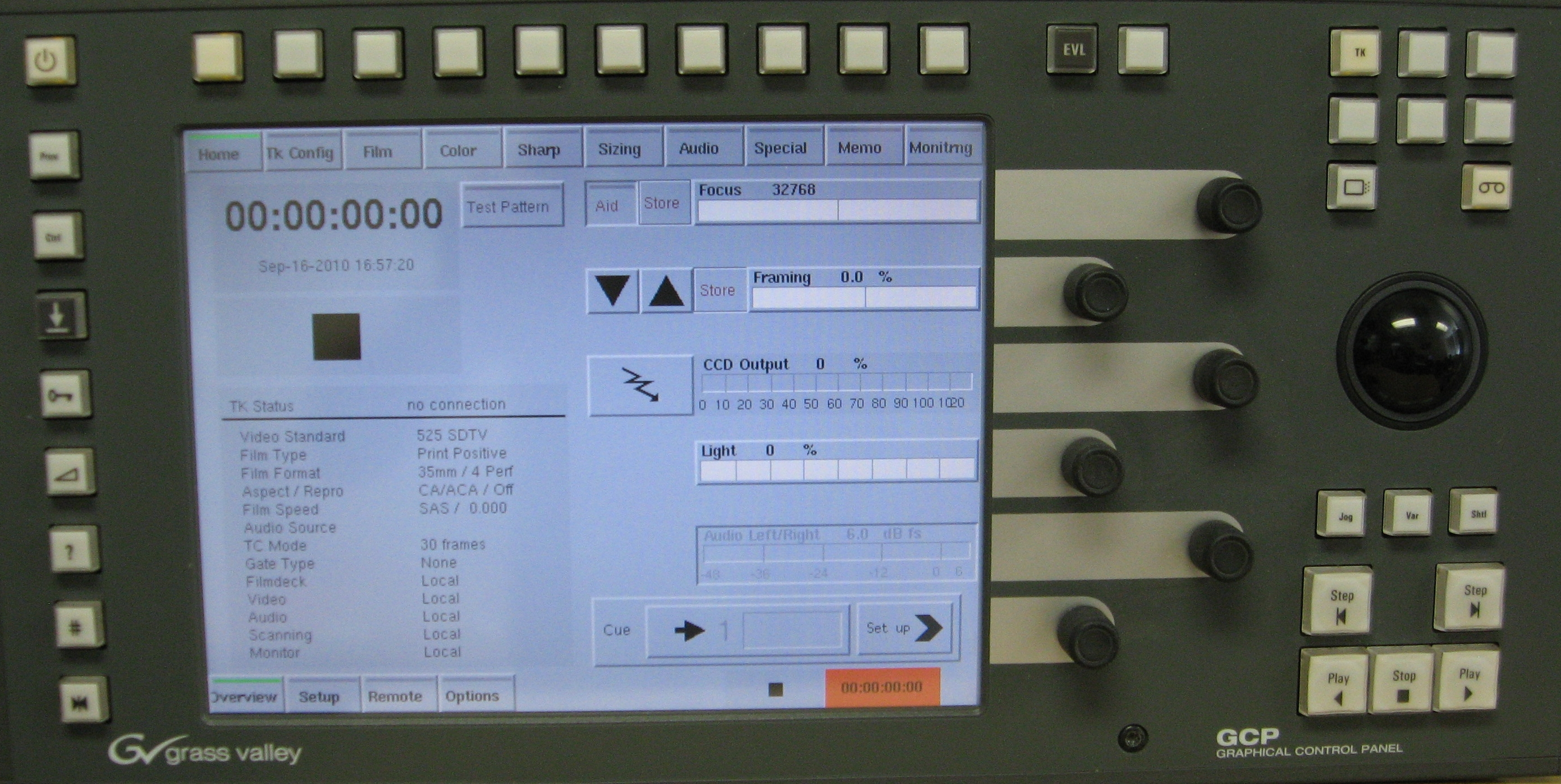
Spirit Datacine GCP, Control Panel

=== SDC 2K Spirit DataCine ===
In 2005 SDC 2K Spirit DataCine was demonstrated by Thomson's Grass Valley, The Scanning optic system are made by Kodak in NY. The CCD are made by Dalsa. SDC 2K has a full 2K (2048) RGB resolution. Like the SDC 200x the unit is made in Germany. SDC 2K Spirit DataCine uses three physical CCDs: red, green and blue. The optional RGB resolution independent Scream film grain reducer is now internal to the Datacine. The SDC 2K Spirit DataCine could be configured as just a data scanner output on a GSN fiber Optic with speeds up to 30 frame/s at 2K or just a video telecine (with a spatial processor) or both. The DPX data files are outputted to a Bones Linux workstation that is connected to a SAN.

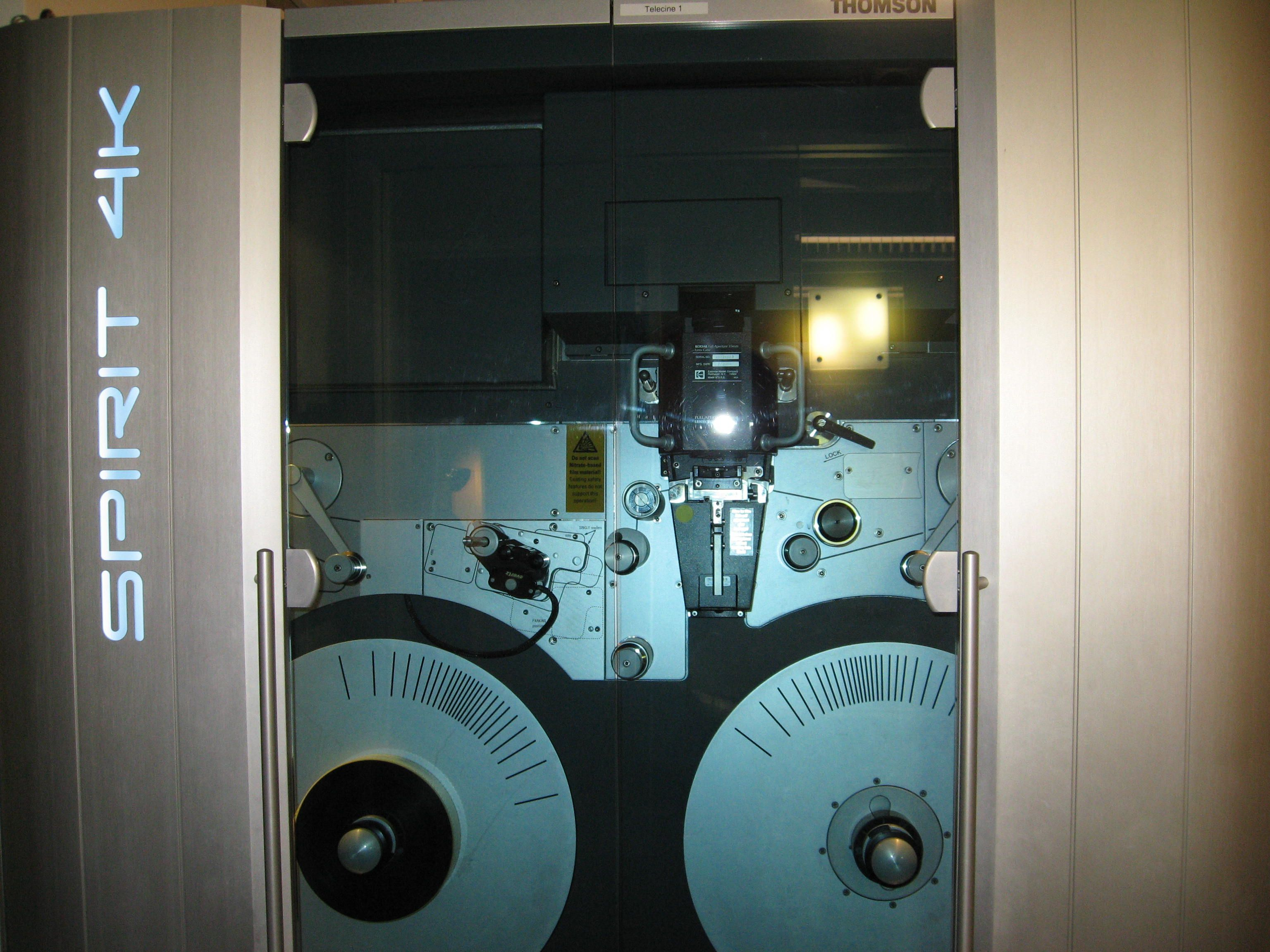
Spirit Datacine 4k with the doors closed

=== SDC 4K Spirit DataCine ===
Same as the SDC 2K Spirit DataCine but with the optional 4k (4096) data scanning license, It can output 4k DPX files at 8 frames per second, SAN speed permitting. With the optional scaler the 4k CCD output could be used as an oversampled 2K output. The unit can also output 16 bit data.

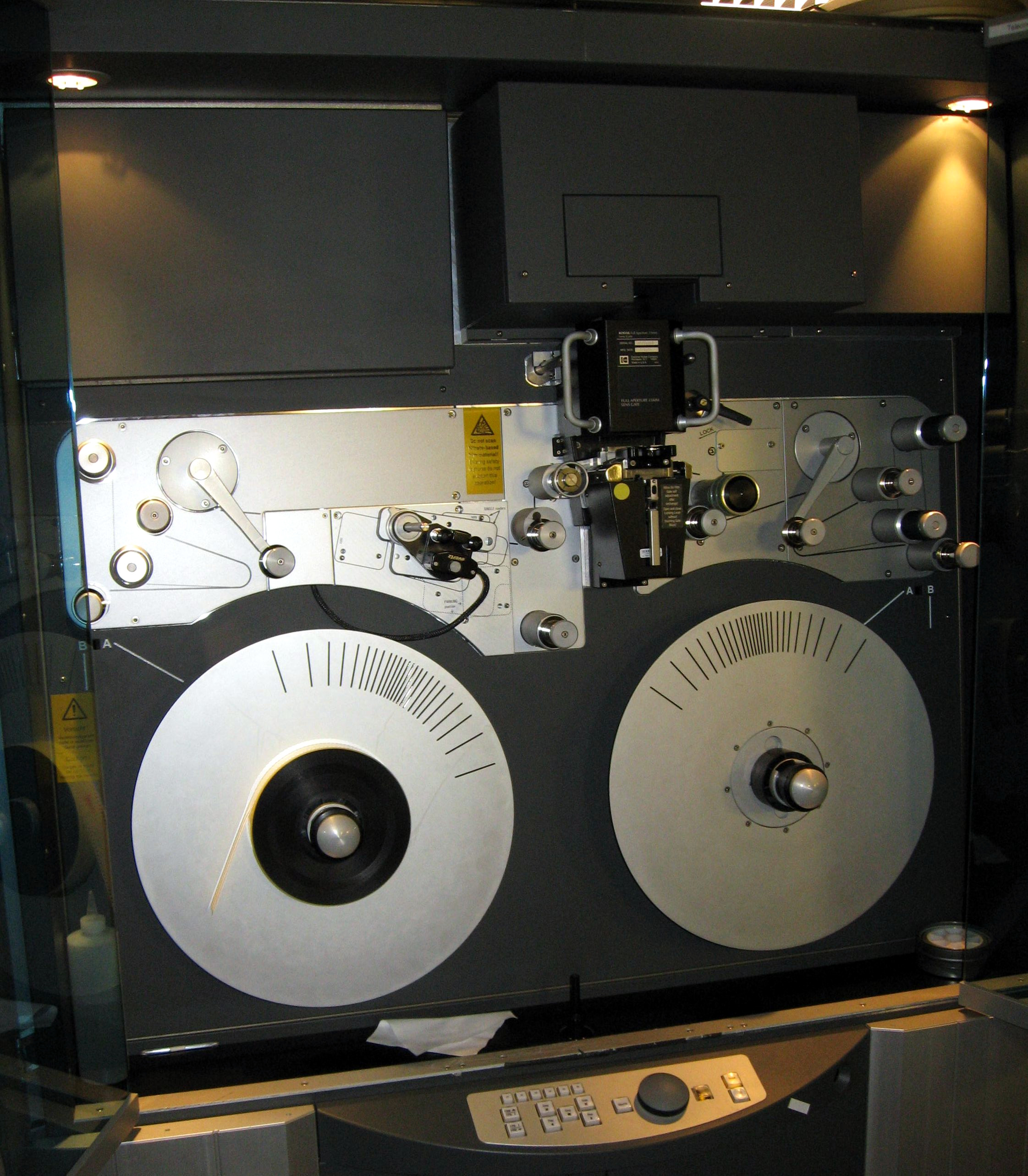
Spirit Datacine 2K – 4K – HD with the doors open

=== SDC HD Spirit DataCine ===
In 2007 the SDC HD Spirit DataCine, that is similar to the SDC 2K Spirit DataCine and SDC 4K Spirit DataCine was introduced. The SDC HD can output HD and SDTV video from rack 2. As the spatial processor is now part of rack 2, eliminating the need for the many electronic cards in rack 3. The option Data interface output is now using infiniband fiber Optic, rather than GSN, 2nd generation SDC 2K-SDC 4K.

=== Bones Dailies ===
In 2007 Bones Dailies was introduced, a Linux non-linear post-production software system. Bones Dailies can control all dailies production process: ingest to a SAN, up to 30 frame/s – faster than real-time and make color-graded Dailies masters. It has an audio ingest, audio syncing, ASC CDL based primary, and secondary color-correction. It will work in multiple formats: SD, HD, or 2K-4K material and can ingest content from the Spirit DataCine or other devices like video tape or digital acquisition cameras. Bones can also be used in a virtual telecine mode.

- Bones ingest was introduced in 2004 and was the replacement to PTE – Phantom Transfer Engine software that ran on a SGI – IRIX platform. Ingest (Bones or PTE) software is used to transfer the DPX data files from the DataCine to a SAN.
- At NAB 2014 a new Phantom 2 transfer product was released, that runs on a Linux system, replacing Bones ingest. The product was ended in 2025.

=== Flexxity ===
On September 5, 2011, DFT announced a new product Flexxity. Flexxity is a suite of software for a host of post-production applications. Flexxity can process DPX, R3D, ARRIRAW, QuickTime clips, stereoscopic 3D support with stereo color matching and parallax adjustments, left and right eye synchronization and more. Flexxity has a unique fast image and audio synchronization feature. The product ended in 2019.

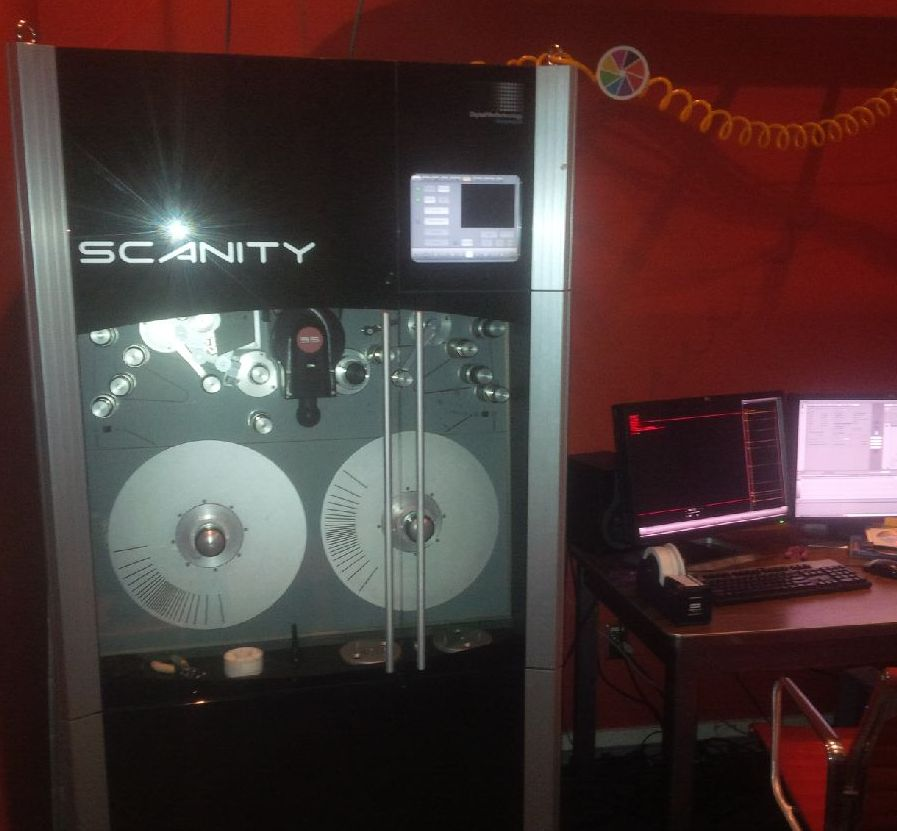
Scanity 4k.jpg

=== Scanity ===
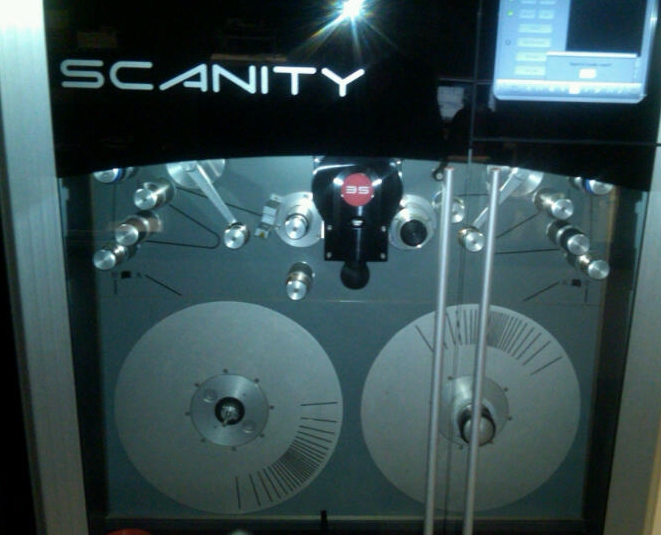
DFT Scanity Film Deck

DFT – Digital Film Technology revealed its new film scanner at the 2009 NAB Show, Scanity. Scanity uses Time Delay Integration (TDI) line sensors and FPGA image processing. The TDI CCDs have 4300 horizontal active pixels, and up to 96 TDI lines, with a 6μ pixel size. Scanity uses a continuous film transport servo system, using a capstan and a LED light source. Transfer speeds are up to: 15 frame/s @ 4K, 25 frame/s @ 2K, 44 frame/s @ 1K, 69 frame/s @ 0.5K, 96 frame/s @ 0.25K. Scanity LED light sources is variable and programmable. Like all the telecines above it uses a continuous motion capstan film transport. New for scanity is the use of an infrared CCD channel for dirt mapping. Also new is large drum gate that give better performance with older film and the use of CCD camera to take pictures of the perf hole. The perf hole camera image is used for real time picture stabilization, thus no pins are used in the perf sprocket holes.

The Scanity can be set to use just on edge of the perf sprocket hole. Scanity has a new optical audio scanning option for 16mm and 35mm, also 16 mag strip audio. Dot Hill Systems as partnered with Digital Film Technology to capture 4k DPX files at 15 frames per second. Scanity has an optional Infrared-IR camera option. The IR camera channel can be used with the Scanity's optional IR dirt and scratch removal system or be outputted on a four IR channel for downstream dirt and dirt and scratch removal systems. Popular downstream dirt and scratch removal systems are PF Clean and Digital ICE.

=== Scanity 2 ===
Scanity 2 is DFT’s next-generation film scanner introduced in September 2025. Scanity 2 has the ability to scan real-time 4K. The other upgrade is increased dynamic sensitivity, with triple-exposure Max HDR Mode dynamic-range scanning. Scanity 2 overscan area scans up to 5,300 pixels in 35mm and 4,700 pixels in 16mm, with improved film stabilization. Options are: Super 8, film sound (Sondor Soundhouse or Digital Optical Sound Extraction), full-immersion wet gate, infrared channel for dirt-matte generation,

=== Scanity HDR ===
At NAB in April 2014 DFT introduced the Scanity HDR. A Scanity with High-dynamic-range imaging option. The Scanity can scan very dark black-and-white film with more dynamic range and lower noise, using special digital processing. With the use of triple exposure all at once, HDR scanning can be done without reducing the speed of the scan transfer, so 4k can still be scanned at 15pfs and 2K at real time, 24 fps. Scanity HDR bring out more details in black and white film.

=== Scanity wet-gate ===
DFT has demonstrated and delivered a full immersion wet-transfer film gate for Scanity 16mm and 35mm film in 2015. The film is run through a tank of fluid. This both hides surface scratches in the film and helps clean the film. Full immersion also eliminates the risk of bubbles appearing in the film optic path. The gate uses rollers, so the film is not at risk of scratches. At the gate exit, the film is dried.

=== Scanity 16 Plus – S8mm ===
DFT introduced a new 16 Plus gate in 2017. The new gate supports the many small film format gauges, like Super 8 film, 8 mm film and 9.5 mm film.

=== DFT POLAR HQ ===
DFT POLAR HQ is a native 8K archive film scanner released in 2023. DFT POLAR HQ is designed for new film and archive remastering film, able to output both 4K and 8K resolution. DFT POLAR HQ has: Touchless film handling, Optical Pin Registration, Visible shuttle, Dual & Triple HDR modes, Keykode, full edge-to-edge scans, Diffuse light source, optional (IR) Infrared and optional Audio pick system.

=== Phantom 2 ===
At NAB in April 2014 DFT introduced Phantom 2. This software is for outputting the Spirit Datacine's DPX files. Phantom 2 Transfer Engine software runs on a Linux computer and is used to record the DPX files from a Spirit DataCine with a data option. These files are then stored on a storage area network. A Phantom 2 can replace a Phantom one or Bones ingest system. Data interface output uses infiniband fiber optic. Product was ended in 2025.

=== OXScan 14K ===
OXScan 14K is 65mm film and 70 mm film scanner at up to a depth of 16 bits, released in 2022. Able to output TIFF and DPX files. File sizes for mastering has a max size of up to 14.3K horizontal and 10.7K vertical resolution. A 35mm gate is also available. File output can be DPX or TIFF 10 or 16 bit output. 65/70mm film is supported in both 5 perf and 15 perf. In 2024 the OXScan 14K was moved to the Prasad Studios line, no longer a DFT product.

=== Sondor ===
On December 9, 2016 Digital Film Technology (dft), completed the acquisition of Sondor. Sondor products were manufactured in Zollikon, Switzerland. Sondor was founded in 1952 by Willy Hungerbuehler. Sondor is noted as inventing the standard for bi-phase interlocking pulse signals to sync sound to film. Current products:

- Versa, telecine-scanner, optical sound scan: and Magnetic sound scan
- Resonances, optical soundtrack
- Sound system for the Scanity.

== See also ==
- Cintel
- Digital film
- Direct to disk recording
- Film chain
- Film industry
- Film stock
- Hard disk recorder
- HDTV blur
- Kinescope
- Sound follower
- Telerecording
