= Wet-transfer film gate =

Film restoration device

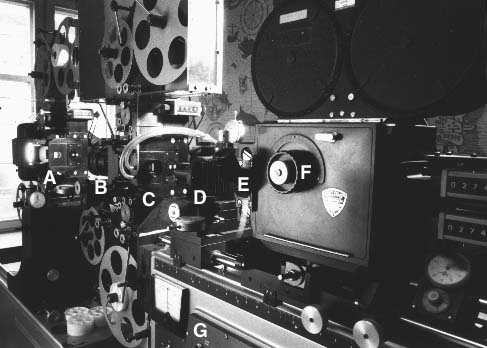
A 35 mm optical printer with two projector heads, used in producing movie special effects and film restoration. Starting from the left, light is shining from the lamp house, then at A is the first projector's film gate, at B a lens that projects the film in A onto the second projector's wet gate C (note the white hoses for the liquid). At D is the lens of the camera, the camera's finder is at E and the adjustable shutter control at F. The heavy base G contains all the electronics needed for controlling the printer.

A wet-transfer film gate, or wet gate for short, is a film gate that is submerged in liquid, used for film restoration and archival scanning. Submerging the film in the gate in a liquid with a suitably matched refractive index reduces the effects of scratches on the film, by reducing the refractive effects which divert light that passes through the scratched part of the film. The liquid also acts to lift other forms of defects from the film. Perchloroethylene, a hazardous substance with multiple health and safety risks, is commonly used as the liquid medium in wet gate systems, requiring substantial precautions to be taken to ensure the safety of operators and to prevent pollution.

Wet gate transfer is often preceded by other forms of film cleaning, such as the use of ultrasonic film cleaners.

== See also ==
- Registration pin
- Optical printing § Restoration printing
- Full immersion wet-transfer film gate
