= Film chain =

Diagram of a top view of a typical film chain

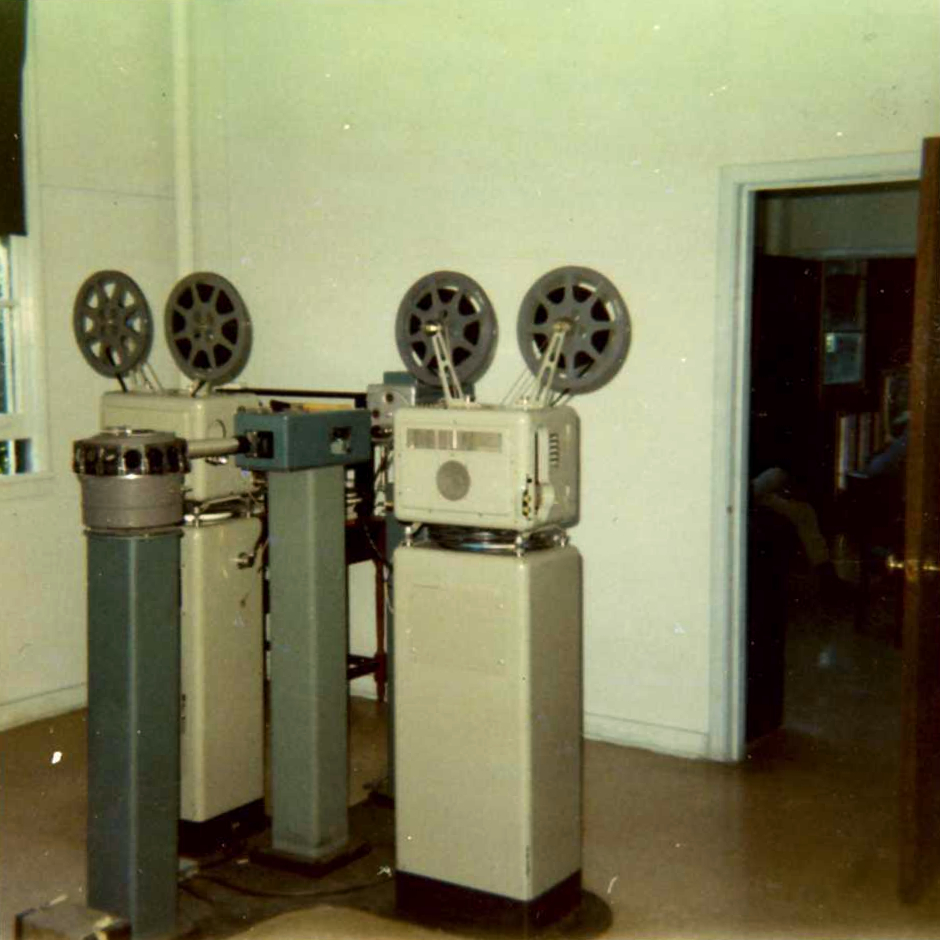
Film chain setup c. 1969 at the ARFN/AFRTS station in Base Support Unit Kodiak in Kodiak, Alaska

A film chain or film island is a professional video camera with one or more projectors aligned into the photographic lens of the camera. With two or more projectors a system of front-surface mirrors that can pop-up are used in a multiplexer. These mirrors switch different projectors into the camera lens. The camera could be fed live to air for broadcasting through a vision mixer or recorded to a VTR for post-production or later broadcast. In most TV use this has been replaced by a telecine.

== Projectors ==
The projectors often are: 16 mm film movie projector, a 35 mm slide projector and a 35 mm film movie projector. In low-end use the motion picture 35 mm projector would be replaced by a second 16 mm projector or 8 mm film, or Super 8 mm film or Single-8 projector. The multiplexer with the camera and projectors surrounding it would often be called a film island. The optical or magnetic soundtrack on the motion picture would be picked up by the projector and would be fed to an audio sound mixing console or to the VTR. (See: Sound-on-film, Film sound, and 35 mm sound.)

The slide projector at a TV station would be used for the TV station's logo, the familiar "Please Stand By" slide, Emergency Broadcast System test or alert slides and some test patterns. Some used a dual-rotating drum slide projector that would have its own mirrors to switch between the drums.

The film projectors used in a film chain are not standard. A special five-blade shutter is used to convert the film's 24 frames per second into NTSC's 30 frame per second video. If this was not used, the video would have major flicker problems. This process is called a "3:2" pull down. Modern telecines use the same process, but it is done electronically, not with a five-blade shutter. "3:2" pull down means that a film frame is shown for three TV fields. The next film frame is shown for two TV fields. The add field in the "3" is used to convert the 24 frames per second to 30 frames per second. A normal projector has a two-bladed shutter that shows the same frame twice. Before modern continuous motion telecines, film chains were sometime referred to as telecines.

All film projectors use sprocket rollers to move the film and a pull-down claws to move and stop the film in the gate. The film is moved in the gate while the shutter blocks the light.

In PAL, SECAM, and other 25 frames per second systems, the film projector speed is increased one frame per second to 25 frame/s. This gives a one-to-one film to video frame transfer ratio. Thus a standard two-bladed shutter can be used.

See frame rate differences for more information.

== The camera ==
A film chain usually used a video camera tube as this reduced flicker. Vidicon image pick up tubes were the preferred pick up for film chains as these gave the least amount of flicker. When charge-coupled device (CCD) cameras were introduced these were also used in a film chain. CCD cameras often gave a sharper picture, but with more flicker.

Early film chains had black and white (B&W) cameras and many were later replaced with color. The camera could be a standard professional video camera, but most often was a camera designed for the purpose of film transfer.

Originally only print positive film was used. Later cameras that could invert and color correct color negative film were used.

Professional video cameras made for film chains were used for broadcast use.

A scene-by-scene color correction option was later added to film chains. This was first done by notching the edge of the film where a color change was wanted. Later, machines that counted the sprocket holes were used. At the mark (the notch or the electronic sprocket-count number) the next stored color correction would occur. See color grading for more information.

== Products ==
=== RCA ===
RCA was by far the largest maker of film chains for broadcast with the monochrome TK-21 and the color TK-26, TK-27, TK-28, and TK-29 film pickup cameras.

Its broadcast division also designed and built 16 mm projectors for television use, including the TP-6, that was often used with a TP-15 Multiplexer. Early 16 mm installations tended to be RCA TP-16 or Eastman 250.

A different RCA division developed 35 mm projectors for television use, culminating in the 35 mm FR-35 and a not so well regarded 16 mm FR-16 projectors. Early 35 mm installations tended to be RCA TP-35.

RCA's TP-66, which debuted in the early 1960s, was widely used in stations and networks for 16 mm silent, optical, and magnetic sound film playback, both live on air and to videotape for editing or delayed broadcast. It is still used by a number of home movie transfer outfits due to its generally low cost of acquisition, and that it was designed to run 24/7 playing back without problems the film content that made up much television programming in television's first 30 years.

RCA's final film pickup camera, the TK-29, came in three models, A, B and C. The "A" was a basic model, "B" added more control and options. The TK-29C was RCA's "teleproduction" version, and could be equipped with "ChromaComp", an early form of color correction hardware.

For transfer of high-end television commercials to videotape, TK-29Cs were equipped by some post-production houses with various forms of triggering the color correction settings in sync with film movement. Punched paper tape was one of the methods used to record the settings, much like film color timing systems of that era.

As television program suppliers moved to videotape and then satellite distribution, prints of theatrical films and programs were transferred to videotape, often from separate 35 mm picture and sound elements. Sacramento independent television station KRBK (31) kept its film islands and 1" recorders busy transferring Hollywood-created material for syndication. One of the two islands had a TK-29C, FR-35, and an electronic pitch shifter to restore the natural pitch of the sound when films and shows were speeded up to gain more commercial time. Episodes of Little House on the Prairie were transferred at KRBK, and are still being fed to stations for airing.

=== Other manufacturers ===
- General Electric also made film chains, both in B&W and color; among its color film cameras were the PE-24 and PE-240, both of which used four vidicon tubes (designated as "4-V"). GE film chains were also prevalent in many television stations; one of its largest clients was ABC. CBS also used GE film pickup cameras.
- Eastman Kodak made several well regarded 16 mm projectors for television use.
- TeleMation Inc. made B&W and color film chains like the TMM-203 Multiplexer and TMU-100 Uniplexers. TeleMation cameras and later film chain camera racks were used for the pick up. These often used Bell & Howell projectors, like the B&H 379. Bell & Howell later purchased Telemation. Fotomat used a fleet of TeleMation units for 16 mm, 8 mm, and S8 mm transfers to VHS.
- Bosch Fernseh made a number of color and B&W film chains for many years, such as the OMY Color Film Chain; color film chain with a KCU-40 camera, B&W film chain in 1968.
- A number of manufacturers made small home film transfer systems.

The introduction of the Rank Cintel Mark III flying spot scanner and Bosch Fernseh FDL 60, called a telecine, paved the way to shift from projector-based transfer to a gentler system, continuous transport motion, that allowed the easy transfer of negative film and print film and thus the decline of film chains. Film slides were replaced by 2D computer graphics devices.

== See also ==
- Flying-spot scanner for scanning slides
- Color suite
- Kinescope
- Sound follower
- Spirit DataCine
