= Sound follower =

Device for the recording and playback of film sound

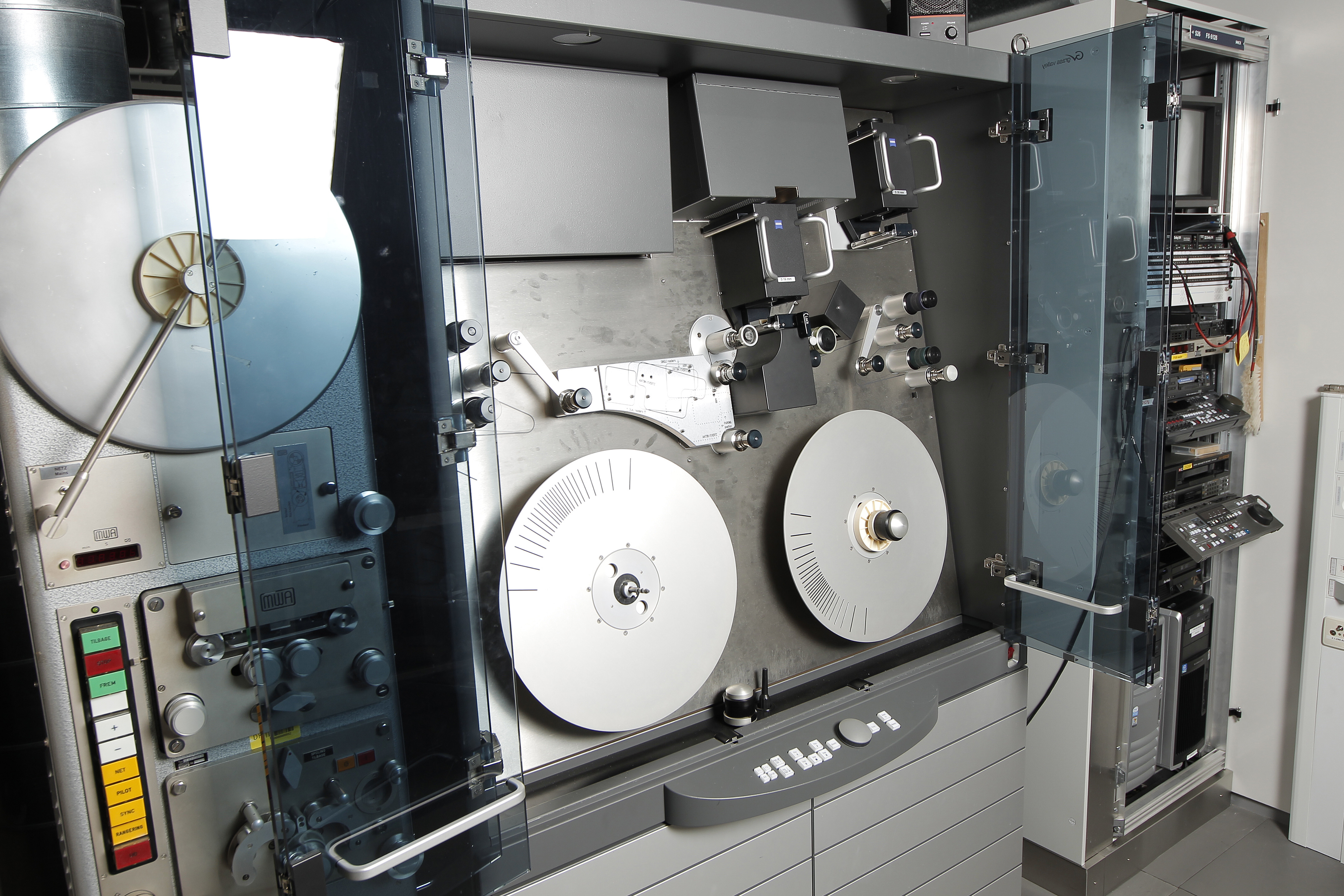
A sound follower to the left of a shadow telecine in the center of the image

A sound follower, also referred to as separate magnetic, sepmag, magnetic film recorder, or mag dubber, is a device for the recording and playback of film sound that is recorded on magnetic film. This device is locked or synchronized with the motion picture film containing the picture. It operates like an analog reel-to-reel audio tape recording, but using film, not magnetic tape. The unit can be switched from manual control to sync control, where it will follow the film with picture.

== Operation ==
Magna Tech electronic film recorders and reproducer, sepmag

Many motion picture cameras do not record audio sound on the film, so in professional film production, there is a need to have the sound recorded and played back on a device that has a double-system recording to tapes, or by any means, for example DAT or Nagra, SD or other audio recording media and then transferred to 16 mm or 35 mm sprocketed magnetic film. The sound recording would then be synchronized with a movie projector or a telecine. Either 35 mm or 16 mm film that is fully coated with a magnetic material can be locked, sprocket hole by sprocket hole, to the film with the picture image. On the set, a clapperboard is used to mark the spot where the sound and picture will later be aligned in editing.

Typical sound followers lock to the power line using a sync motor and toothed timing belts, or by using 240 Hz bi-phase interlocking pulse signals to sync sound to film. The 240 Hz bi-phase is ten times the 24-frame rate. Sound followers are found in many post-production studios for record and playback and in movie theater for sound playback. In telecine use, the 24 frames per second is slowed to 23.976 frames/s to lock to SDTV and some HDTV standards, thus the digital bi-phase pulse is 239.76 Hz.

The average feature film requires a large amount of 35 mm film. One second of 35 mm film uses 1.5 feet of film, moving at 18 inches per second (46 cm/s). One minute of film uses 90 feet (27.4 m), and one hour uses 5,400 feet (1.6 km). So, a two-hour movie with previews uses 11,250 feet or 2.13 miles (3.43 km) of film. For 16 mm film, these numbers are all divided by 2.5 (36 ft/min.). Because a two-hour movie is so long, the whole is divided onto five or six reels. While a film projector uses an intermittent mechanism to play the film, a sound follower and most telecines use continuous motion.

By having the sound and picture sync this way this clearly saves the expense and time of making an optical print or magnetic sound track strip on the edge of the film. The Sepmag would follow a projector or a telecine or a hand-cranked or motorized film viewer on a workbench. The sepmag sound follower would stay in sync with the film. In post-production work, a dubbed sound track of sound effects, or a second language, could be added to other channels of the sepmag.

Sepmag had different record head configurations. A device could have a single mono track, dual two track or 4 track. The tracks are very large and the magnetic film moving at the normal speed of 24 frames per second, gave very good sound reproduction. As such, a mixing studio would have many units, to mix all the sound and effect down to 4, 2 and one track as needed.

Magnetic film used is 3 to 5 mils thick, the same as the picture film, so the picture and sound have equal diameters on the film reels. The magnetic film has magnetic oxide coating on the complete width of the film. and the standard monaural track in 16 mm and 35 mm is 200 mils wide. 35 mm mag films may not be fully coated, but "striped" to permit editing marks to show through both sides. The first films used were acetate base till 1970, then replaced by polyester base. Acetate base is unstable, can have degradation, the ferric oxide coating and the Acetate base can cause vinegar degradation.

In 1914, the first SEPMAG patent was filed. In 1929, the first sound follower was on the market and by 1941, AC biasing models were sold, giving better sound quality. The Stille SEPMAG transport was one of the first SEPMAG systems. Some of the older sound followers' interlock speeds were too slow to keep up with the high speed shuttle speeds of modern telecines; therefore, some 240 Hz bi-phase buffers were made to help solve this problem.

== Models ==
The major makers of sound followers are M.T.E.'s Magna Tech, RCA, and Sondor. Models can come in playback-only model or record-and-playback. Models can have the option of changing the number of tracks. Some are equipped with dual sets of sprockets that can use more than one size of magnetic film, 16 mm or 35 mm.

- Magna Tech – M.T.E.
  - SERIES 600, Electronic Film Recorders and Reproducers
  - Magna-Tech 835-B-6 600 Stepper motor transport.
- Sondor
  - OMA E
  - BASIC
  - SOUNDHOUSE
  - Libra M03A
  - ALTRA
- MTM – Multi-Track Magnetics Inc.
  - MTM D106/DCS-6 Stepper motor transport.
  - Ranger Tone
- Rank Cintel
  - FeRRIT Modern microprocessor transport control.
- MWA Nova GmbH – MWA Albrecht GmbH
  - MB41
  - MB51, Multi Format Magnetic Film Recorder/Player
- RCA
  - RCA PM85 6 Channel 35 mm Magnetic Film Recorder Stepper motor transport
- TEAC
  - TEAC 35 mm dubber
  - TEAC 16 mm dubber
- Steenbeck
  - ST3514
- Kinevox – Portable vacuum tube model, Burbank, California, CA
  - Kinevox Synchronous Magnetic Film Recorder (pre-1951)

== Alternate uses ==
Sound followers were also used in the 1960s strictly for audio recording & record album mastering, for the magnetic film format at the time had several advantages over standard magnetic recording tape. Magnetic film's extra thickness over tape made it less susceptible to "print-through", and its sprocket-driven nature made it less likely to suffer from tape flutter and other speed variations. Command Records in the 1960s released several albums that were recorded and mastered on 35 mm magnetic film for several artists on the label, such as Enoch Light, Tony Mottola, and others.

It is generally accepted that Everest Records subsidiary of the Belock Instrument Corporation based in College Point New York pioneered the use of three channel 35 mm magnetic film from around 1959. When the company transferred to Hollywood under new ownership in 1961 the Everest Bayside Recording Studio was sold and the 35 mm equipment to Mercury Records and later Command Classics. Improvements in standard tape technology and the high cost of the 35 mm process led to its discontinuance.

== Fate ==
Sound followers are not used for most new film productions (the major exception being IMAX). Sound followers are still in use, as there are many separate magnetic films in film vaults. Reel-to-reel tape, then later hard disk drive and solid-state drive recording system replaced sound followers.

== See also ==
- Flatbed editor
- Film editing
- Film splicer
- History of multitrack recording
- List of film formats
- Movietone
- Phonofilm
- Photokinema
- RCA Photophone
- Recording studio
- Sound film
- Sound-on-disc
- Vitaphone
