= Film gate =

Opening inside a camera for light to enter

The film gate is the rectangular opening in the front of a motion picture camera where the film is exposed to light, or the rectangular opening in the front of a film projector allowing a beam of light through when projecting the film.

In a motion picture camera, the film gate holds the film still while it is exposed to light through the aperture formed by the shutter. During this exposure, the film is held in the gate by a pressure plate behind the film, thereby holding it on a uniform plane and at a calibrated distance from the shutter. This is essential if the resulting image is to be in focus over the whole of the frame of film.

The film gate can be seen by removing the lens and rotating the shutter out of the way.

== "Hair in the gate" ==
Occasionally, as the film passes through the gate, friction can cause small slivers of celluloid to break off and stick in the side of the opening, or a speck of dust can lodge there. These pieces of debris are called hairs, even though they are not literally "hair". A "hair in the gate" will remain in front of the film and create a dark line that sticks into the edge of the film frame as the camera is filming a shot. A hair can ruin the shot and is almost impossible to fix in post production without using modern digital removal techniques.

Because of the intractability of this problem the focus puller (or 1st Assistant Camera) will open the camera and examine the gate for hairs at the end of each shot. Normally the assistant director will call out "check the gate" when the director is ready to move on to the next shot. The crew will wait until the focus puller calls out "gate is clean." If the gate is not clean, it will be cleaned with orangewood sticks and canned air and the crew will take the shot again. A good camera crew usually checks all cameras and magazines during equipment checkout with "scratch tests" using fogged film rolls — this will catch out any possible scratch or hair problems caused by faulty equipment. However, a variety of other factors including environment, humidity, type of film stock, camera position, film ridging, and lacing can each be responsible for a "hair in the gate". Generally, skilled crew and regularly inspected tested equipment make this a rare occurrence, and it is not unheard of for assistants to go for months without seeing one, even on large-scale shoots. The cinematographer Oliver Stapleton praised his assisting team on Casanova for not having a single hair or scratch for the whole shoot, even though large portions were shot on dusty exteriors.

Video cameras do not have this problem, as any malfunction of the sensor will render the entire system useless. The Arri D-20 and D-21 system, however, does have removable lenses and a rotating optical shutter, which means that the CMOS sensor can be exposed in much the same way as a film gate and thus needs to be kept assiduously clean.

== Methods of checking the gate ==
There are three different commonly accepted ways to check a film gate for hairs.

=== Pulling the lens ===
In this method, the lens is taken off of the camera and the shutter is moved either with an automatic button (usually labeled "phase" or "dust check") or by manually inching it to an exposed position. The focus puller examines the gate with a flashlight, sometimes attached to a magnifying glass.

=== Through the lens ===
This method tends to be most useful on long lenses and zoom lenses, especially when larger lenses may be difficult to take on and off again quickly. The aperture is fully opened, with the shutter opened, focus set to infinity, and if a zoom, zoomed in as tight as possible. The lens itself acts as a large magnifying glass for the focus puller, who only needs to position the flashlight and their line of sight properly to scan the gate.

=== Pulling the gate ===
Many cameras, though not all, allow for the gate itself to be removed from the camera and examined under a light by the focus puller.

== See also ==
- List of film formats
- Pin registration
- Wet-transfer film gate
