= Color suite =

A color suite (also called a color bay, telecine suite, or color correction bay) is the control room for color grading video in a post-production environment.

== Technology and specifications ==
The video source could be from: a telecine, a video tape recorder (VTR), a motion picture film scanner, virtual telecine or a direct-to-disk recording (DDR) or the older system called a film chain. A high end broadcast color suite may use a Da Vinci Systems or Pandora International color corrector. If a VTR is the source for the video the room is often called a tape to tape suite. Many suites are designed to operate as a telecine suite or a tape to tape suite by changing the configuration of the suite. The operator of the suite is usually called a Colorist. If a telecine is the source this is called a Film to Tape operation. A color suite may use one video standard or be able to change configuration to a number of standards like: high-definition video, NTSC, or PAL or a DI workflow. Color suites are sometime placed in digital cinema movie theaters with a video projector for color correction to that display format.

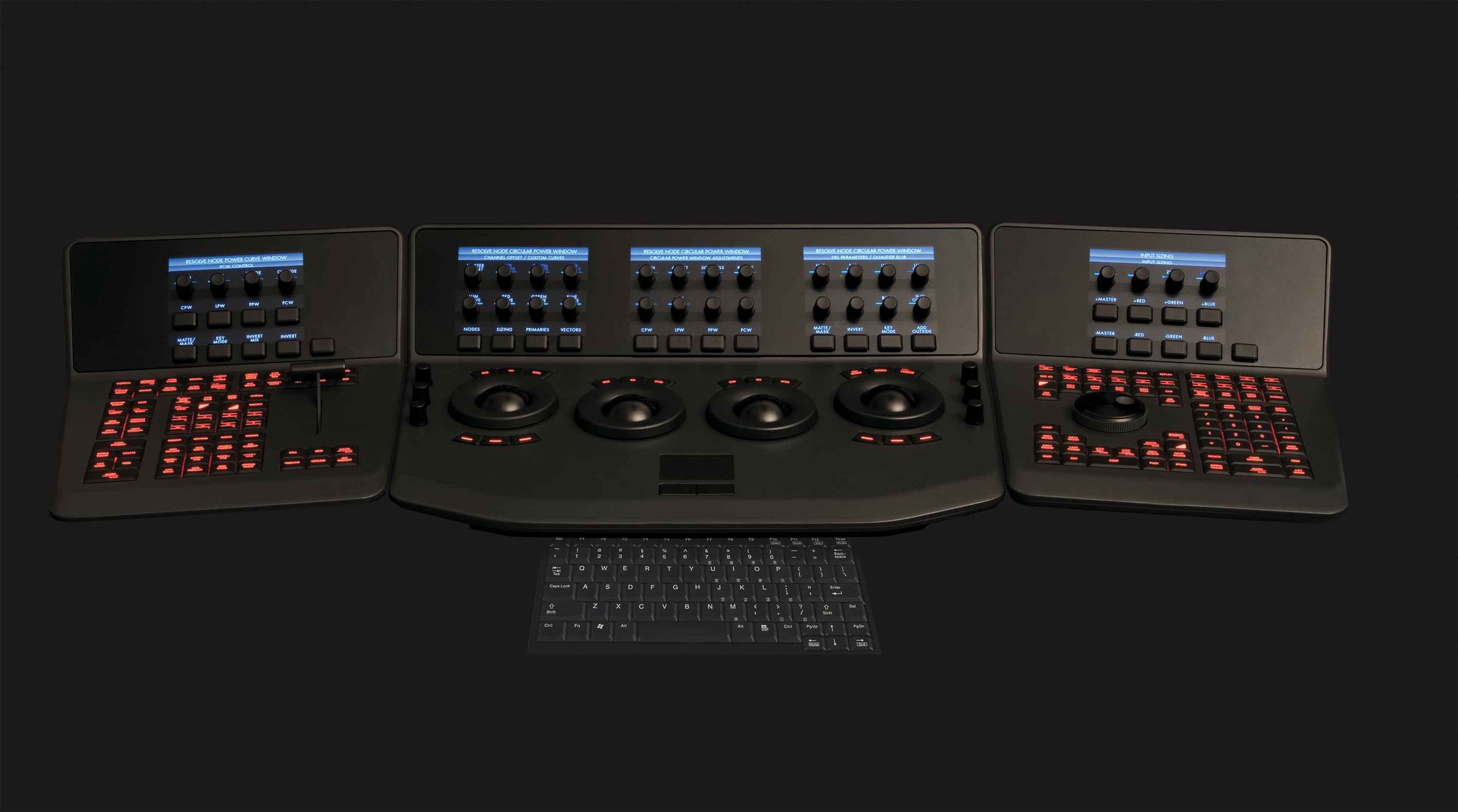
Blackmagic Design DaVinci Resolve Advanced Panel

The suite room will also have equipment in the production control room for monitoring the video signal such a video monitor, waveform monitor and vectorscope.

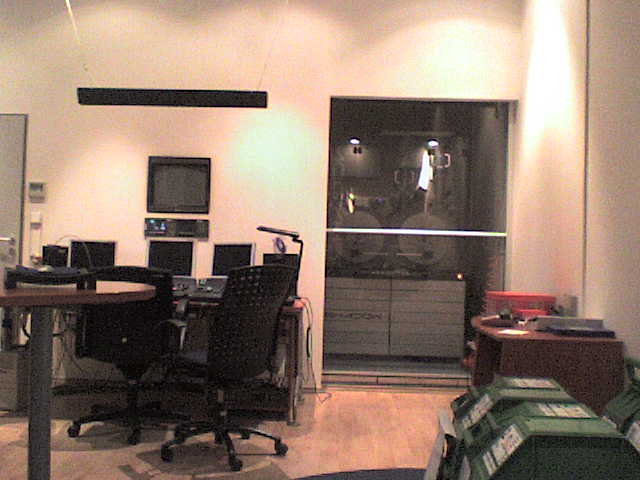
A Shadow Telecine in a color correction suite.

The suite may have an either a non-linear editing system (NLE) or linear editing system to control the source and record device. This may be internal to the color grading device, as in a Pandora's Pogle or Da Vinci's 2k or external, as in Da Vinci's TLC (telecine controller).

A vision mixer may also be in the suite for monitoring different video sources or for simple or special effects in the video. A character generator is sometime used also for titling and subtitle.

The suite may have equipment to read, log and insert into the video Kodak's Keykode. Keykode is bar coding that is placed at regular intervals on negative films to aid in identifying and counting of film frames. Evertz, Aaton and ARRI are three types of readers for telecine use.

The suite may or may not have audio post production equipment. This would be to monitor and if needed sync up the program audio to the video source if the sound was not on the film. An audio mixing console and other audio equipment such as effects devices may also be in the suite. The audio may be from the film soundtrack. The term MOS is used, on a slate, when a scene is filmed without sync sound or any sound. A clapperboard slate is used at the start and sometime at the end of scene to mark particular takes recorded during a production.

Other equipment that may be used in the suite are: digital still store\Frame grabber to store references frames, noise reducer to reduce film grain/dirt and video noise; video router and audio router.

The telecine, VTRs and some of the larger equipment are often placed in a central apparatus room or machine room and are interconnected through Cable trays or raised floor to the color suite by patch panels, coaxial cables, computer network and multicore cables.

Some color suites are at video post production facilities that rent them by the hour for the transfer of TV commercials, documentaries and movies. These color suites would have a client area behind the colorist. With the client present this would be called a supervised session.

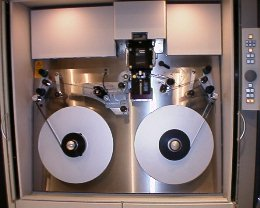
SDC-2000 Spirit DataCine Film Deck, Lens Gate and Local Control Panel

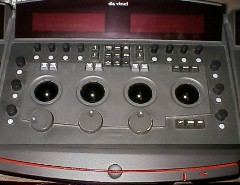
Da Vinci Systems, Joy ball control panel

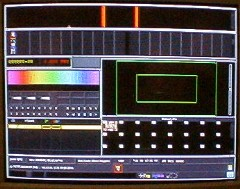
Da Vinci Systems, 2k GUI Display

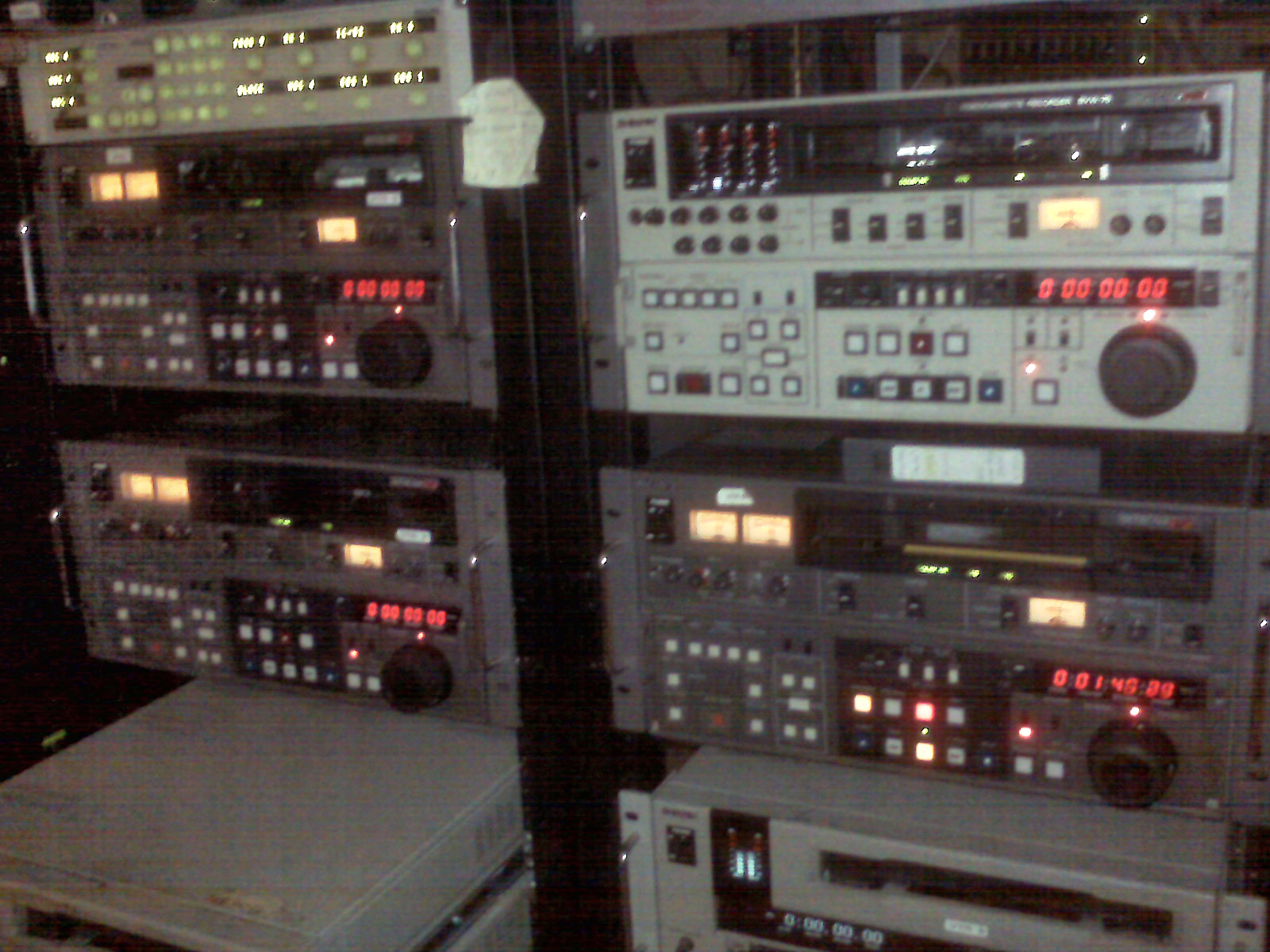
BVW-75, PVW-2800, and UVW-1800 BetacamSP VTRs in a 19-inch racks.

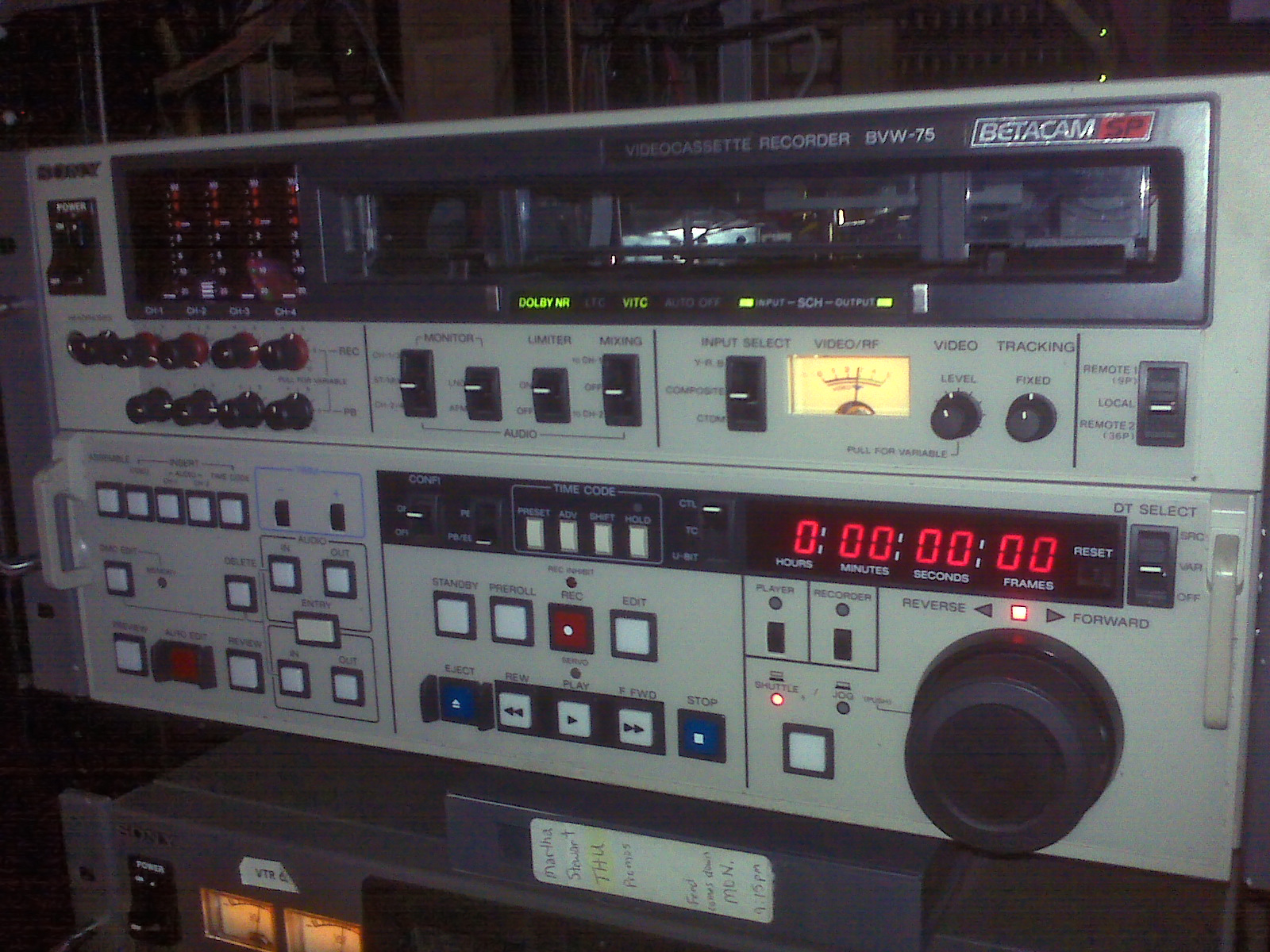
Sony BetacamSP BVW-75 Editing VTR in a 19-inch rack.

== See also ==
- Test film
- 3D LUT
- Cintel, telecine equipment.
- Color motion picture film
- Da Vinci Systems
- Pandora International
- Digital intermediate
- Display resolution
- Faroudja, inventors of reverse telecine technologies.
- Film recorder
- Film restoration
- Film-out
- Gamma correction
- Hard disk recorder
- HDTV blur Factors causing HDTV Blur
- Image scanner
- Telecine (piracy), an unauthorized copy of a film created with a telecine.
- Telerecording (UK)
