= Da Vinci Systems =

Defunct American digital cinema company

da Vinci Systems
- Type: Private
- Industry: Digital cinema
- Founded: 1984
- Defunct: September 8, 2009
- Fate: Acquired; merged into Blackmagic Design
- Headquarters: Coral Springs, Florida
- Owners: Dynatech (1986–2000); Acterna (2000–2005); JDSU (2005–2009)

da Vinci Systems was an American digital cinema technology company based in Coral Springs, Florida. It was founded in 1984 as a spinoff of Video Tape Associates (VTA), a production and post-production facility that had begun developing in-house post-production systems in 1982. The company became known for its color correction and color grading systems, as well as digital mastering and film restoration technologies. Its products were used widely in television and film post-production.

In 1986, the company was acquired by Dynatech, following a corporate merger, Dynatech was renamed Acterna, which continued to hold da Vinci Systems. In 2005, Acterna was acquired by JDS Uniphase, which inherited da Vinci Systems as part of the transaction. In 2009, the financially troubled JDSU sold the company to Blackmagic Design, which merged it into its operations. Blackmagic Design has continued development of da Vinci's flagship software under the name DaVinci Resolve.

== Company history ==
In 1982, Video Tape Associates (VTA), a Hollywood, Florida-based production/post-production facility, began developing the Wiz for internal use and introduced it to the public the following year. The Wiz controlled early telecines such as the RCA FR-35 and the Bosch FDL 60 and offered basic primary and secondary color correction. The American post-production facilities company EDITEL Group asked VTA to build multiple Wiz systems for them. Fifteen units were made and subsequently purchased by other post-production facilities across the country. The Wiz served as a major inspiration/prototype for what would become the da Vinci Classic.

In 1984, VTA Technologies, the research and development division of VTA Post, broke away from its parent company to become da Vinci Systems, Inc. One of its four founders was Bob Hemsky. The da Vinci was the only film-to-tape or tape-to-tape color correction system on the market that offered the capability to create a basic rectangular window shape isolating a secondary color correction. In 1986, da Vinci was acquired by Dynatech Corporation and managed within their Utah Scientific business. Two years later, da Vinci Systems, LLC became its own entity as one of roughly eight video manufacturing companies within the Dynatech Video Group. In 1998, da Vinci Academy was formed to provide training to the growing number of aspiring colorists. The following year, da Vinci acquired Nevada-based Sierra Design Labs, at that time a worldwide leader in HDTV storage and workstation interface solutions.

In 2000, da Vinci's parent company, Dynatech, became Acterna after a merger with Wavetek, Wandel & Goltermann and TTC. Acterna then acquired Singaporean company Nirvana Digital to add the Revival film restoration system to its production line. In 2004, da Vinci had offices in Coral Springs, Los Angeles, New York, London, Paris, Germany, and Singapore. On August 3, 2005, JDS Uniphase acquired Acterna, including da Vinci systems, for $450 million and 200 million shares of JDSU common stock. In September 2009, Blackmagic Design's purchase of da Vinci Systems was announced.

== Product history ==
=== da Vinci Classic (1984-1990) ===
The da Vinci, now known as the da Vinci Classic, was launched in 1984 and manufactured until 1990. At the time of its introduction, it was the only film-to-tape or tape-to-tape color correction system available that offered the capability to correct secondary colors by isolating them. The analog grading system became the most popular color corrector for telecines like the Fernseh FL 60 and Rank Cintel Mark 3. The Classic had a customized external control panel with primary and secondary processing and an internal NTSC encoder. It operated on a Motorola 68000 Multibus 1 system computer. Early models had knob-only color correction controls; trackball control was introduced later.

=== da Vinci Renaissance (1990-1993) ===
The da Vinci Renaissance, manufactured between 1990 and 1993, was similar to the Classic but ran on a Motorola 68020 system rather than a 68000. Kilvectors secondary color processing, which would become an industry standard function for secondary color isolation, later became available on the system. Options for 525 and 625 resolutions were available. The system was often used with FDL 60, FDL 90, MK3, or URSA telecines.

=== da Vinci's Leonardo (1990) ===
In 1990, da Vinci released a low-cost color corrector for smaller facilities. To reduce the cost, they used a flat plate control panel and limited its capabilities to scene-by-scene control of a telecine. The Leonardo did not offer da Vinci color processing and only one unit was sold in its short time on the market.

=== da Vinci Renaissance 888 (1991-1998) ===
In 1991, the da Vinci Renaissance 888 was introduced; it was manufactured until 1998. The 888 operated without a GUI and was the first product ever to include digital 888 signal processing throughout. Power Windows, which enabled area isolation using soft edges and shapes; Custom Curves, a color correction tool using curves; and YSFX, which allowed independently adjustable luminance and chrominance ratios, were all included features. The 888 was used with FDL 60, FDL 90, Quadra, MK3, and URSA telecines.

=== Time Logic Controller (1994) ===
In 1994, da Vinci Systems acquired the Time Logic Controller (TLC) product line from Time Logic. TLC was an edit controller for telecines, vision mixers, and video tape recorders. It provided accurate 2:3 editing when transferring a 24 frames per second film into a 30 frames per second video environment. TLC 1 was released by Time Logic in early 1994 and TLC 2 was released by da Vinci later that year.

=== 888 da Vinci User Interface (1995) ===
In 1995, the 888 da Vinci User Interface (DUI) was introduced. It had similar color processing to the 888 but had a new Windows-style user interface, an internal TLC controller, and EDWIN. The telecine interface card controlled the telecine's internal color corrector. The 888 DUI came in two configurations: the first used a SGI Indy workstation and the second used SGI O2.

The da Vinci Lite, a scaled-down version of the 888 DUI, was released later that year. It was largely unsuccessful due to lack of marketing.

=== da Vinci 2K (1998) ===
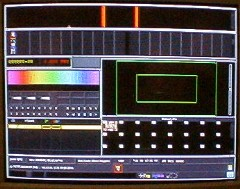
da Vinci 2K display

The da Vinci 2K, which began production in 1998, was an enhanced version of previous color correction systems. With an improved color processing quality and performance, it could support high-definition, standard-definition, and 2K formats. It operated with a 4:2:2, 4:4:4, or 8:4:4 input. The system was initially controlled by SGI O2 before being upgraded to Linux. Many 2Ks were interfaced within the Spirit DataCine or other high-end telecines. da Vinci 2K also included features such as PowerTiers, Defocus (using defocus aberration); and Colorist Toolbox. In 2001, PowerGrades, color presets, and the Gallery, an integrated reference store, were available as additions. 2Ks were among the systems used in the development of digital intermediate. In addition to telecine control, 2Ks were often used for tape-to-tape, virtual telecine, and digital disk recording applications. It also allowed for real-time filesharing. Seabiscuit and Star Wars: Episode I – The Phantom Menace were both graded on the 2K. In 2001, the 2K won the Philo T. Farnsworth Award at the Primetime Engineering Emmy Awards.

The 2K Plus was introduced in 2002. Upgrades included four PowerVectors, Defocus Plus, Colorist Plus, and redesigned primaries, secondaries, and keys. The TLC Assistant allowed for single and dual user modes for editor access. Following JDS Uniphase's 2005 acquisition of Acterna's assets, including da Vinci systems, the 2K Plus continued to evolve and the Emerald, Sapphire, and Ruby upgrade packages were released In 2006, ColorTrace was offered for 2K Plus to track color grades when the edit decision list (EDL) is revised. The 2K Plus was used to grade Scrubs, The War at Home, and 24.

=== Nucleas (2003) ===
Nucleas was launched in 2003, providing server-to-server software interface to existing 2k Plus systems to work from data disks and storage networks. HIPPI and HSDL (High Speed Data Link, which transferred 2K and higher resolution images over HD-SDI links) interfaces and data waveforms were also available. In 2004, the Nucleas Conform was released, which built a data timeline from an EDL, rendered dissolves, and allowed switching between source and record order. The Nucleas DI Suite was used to grade Thunderstruck.

=== Resolve (2004) ===
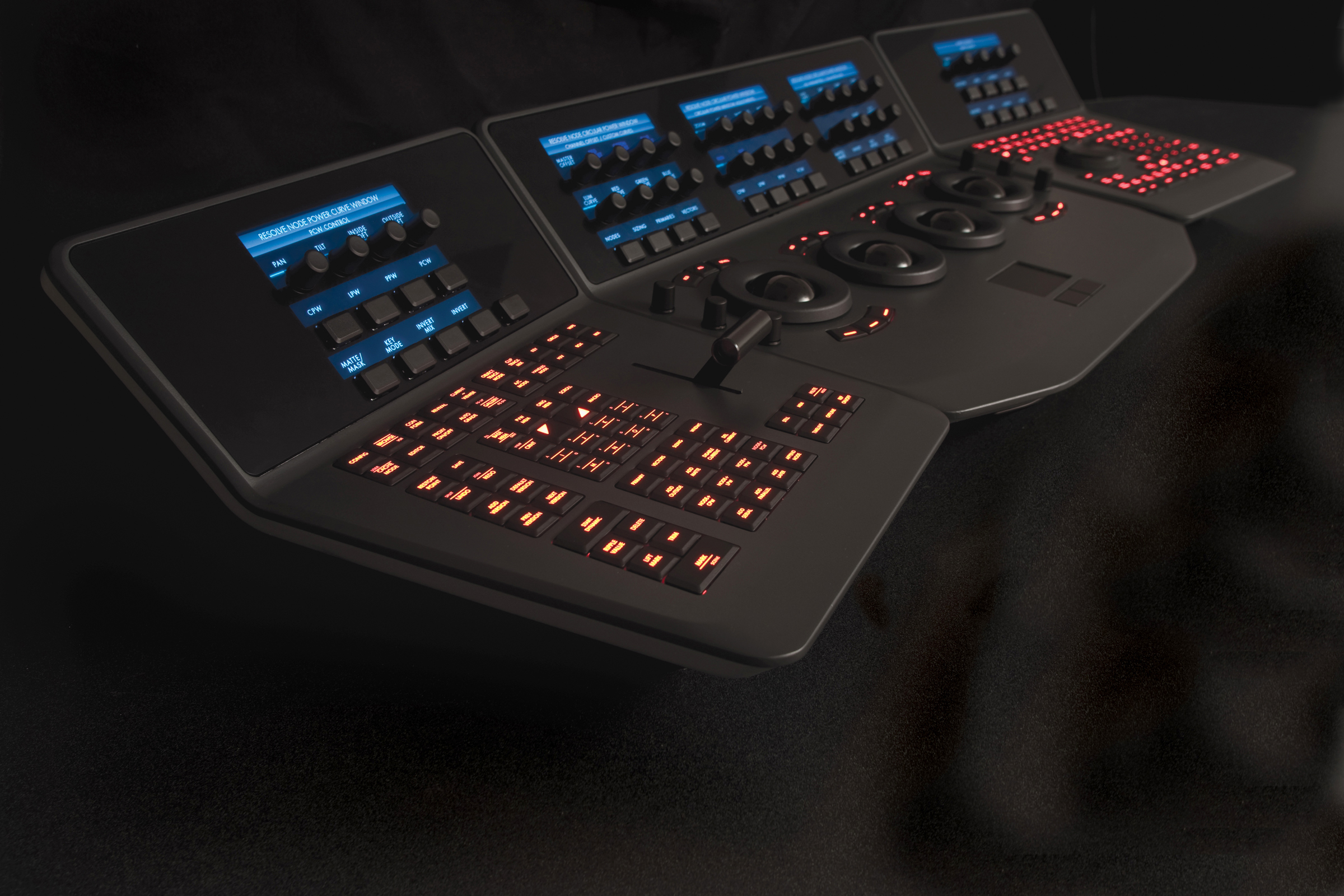
The da Vinci Impresario, a new control panel for the Resolve

In 2004, da Vinci released Resolve, a software-based, resolution-independent color grading system that used multiple parallel processing engines within normal PC computer infrastructure for real-time 2K resolution color grading. It was developed for use specifically within digital intermediate. In addition to color correcting, the Resolve had an advanced toolset that included conforming, network file browsing, scaling, and formatting This system was the first to implement InfiniBand topology. The first season of the TV show Sex & Drugs & Rock & Roll and the film The Grand Budapest Hotel were graded on the Resolve.

In 2007, da Vinci released the Resolve R-3D which was focused on nonlinear grading in 3D. Some of the early films graded on the R-3RD include Quantum of Solace, U2 3D, and Meet the Robinsons. In 2008, Impresario, a new control panel for Resolve, was launched at NAB 2008 and demonstrated at NAB 2009. Resolve v6.2, released in 2009, allowed syncing two Resolve systems for shared work; when any changes are made on one, they immediately appeared on the other.

=== Splice (2004) ===
Like the da Vinci Nucleas, Splice was a server-to-server system that enabled 2K systems to work nonlinearly. It was promoted for use with SANs and as a life-extender for the 2K and 2K Plus. It is also capable of handling 4K files. The Splice was built on the Resolve's Transformer II and mirrored its basic conform and I/O features.

== See also ==
- Parallax Graphics, sister company to da Vinci Systems that also manufactured digital graphics products
