= Digital Picture Exchange =

Image file format family

- Filename extension: .dpx
- Internet media type: image/dpx
- Developed by: SMPTE
- Initial release: 1.0 / 18 February 1994; 32 years ago
- Latest release: 2.0HDR; 2018; 8 years ago
- Type of format: Image file formats
- Extended from: Cineon
- Standard: ST 268-1:2014, ST 268-2:2018
- Open format?: non-free SMPTE standard, USD 175
- Website: www.smpte.org

Digital Picture Exchange (DPX) is a common file format for digital intermediate and visual effects work and is a SMPTE standard (ST 268-1:2014). The file format is most commonly used to represent the density of each colour channel of a scanned negative film in an uncompressed "logarithmic" image where the gamma of the original camera negative is preserved as taken by a film scanner. For this reason, DPX is the worldwide-chosen format for still frames storage in most digital intermediate post-production facilities and film labs. Other common video formats are supported as well (see below), from video to purely digital ones, making DPX a file format suitable for almost any raster digital imaging applications. DPX provides a great deal of flexibility in storing colour information, colour spaces and colour planes for exchange between production facilities. Multiple forms of packing and alignment are possible. The DPX specification allows for a wide variety of metadata to further clarify information stored (and storable) within each file.

The DPX file format was originally derived from the Kodak Cineon open file format (.cin file extension) used for digital images generated by Kodak's original film scanner. The original DPX (version 1.0) specifications are part of SMPTE 268M-1994. The specification was later improved and published by SMPTE as ANSI/SMPTE 268M-2003. Academy Density Exchange (ADX) support for the Academy Color Encoding System are added in the current version of the standard SMPTE ST 268-1:2014. Extensions for high-dynamic-range video and wide color gamut are standardized in SMPTE ST 268-2:2018.

== Metadata and standard flexibility ==
SMPTE specifications dictate a mild number of compulsory metadata, like image resolution, color space details (channel depth, colorimetric metric, etc.), number of planes/subimages, as well as original filename and creation date/time, creator's name, project name, copyright information, and so on.

Furthermore, a couple of industry-specific metadata areas are present: Motion-Picture and Television ones. They are either used only if the picture has enough embedded information relevant to that specific industry, otherwise are left "empty". For example, Motion-Picture-specific metadata includes perforation-exact film KeyKode (if the image comes from a film scan), camera shutter angle, slate information and frame positioning within a frame sequence. On the other side, Television metadata includes full SMPTE time code, video overscan and field information, and signal/colour level information.

A third, variable-size metadata area, which is user-definable, exists. Third-party applications/software occasionally use this area to store additional information; for example, when the DPX stores images with technical specifications far away from the original standard (like pictures coded in the CIE XYZ color space, or Bayer-patterned raw frames from specific digital cameras like the Arriflex D-21). Because each DPX file represents a single frame, motion-picture scans are typically handled as numbered DPX sequences, and metadata for the film as a whole is often maintained externally rather than repeated in each file.

SMPTE ST 268-2:2018 defines a standards-based metadata section that supports Extensible Metadata Platform, XML, and KLV metadata representations.

== Support ==
XnView can read FFmpeg pix_fmt=abgr DPX images. ImageMagick supports DPX. The C++ source of a DPX library is available. DjV, and vooya support DPX sequences. IrfanView also has support for DPX images through a plugin. Lasergraphics motion picture film scanning systems include support for output to DPX color/B&W 10/16-bit (conforms to SMPTE 268M for compatibility with graphics, compositing, and other post production systems).

== See also ==
- Comparison of graphics file formats
- Digital film
- Digital intermediate
- Display resolution
- Film-out
- Film recorder
- Material Exchange Format (MXF), media container format
- Post-production
- Telecine
