= Cintel =

British digital cinema company

Cintel International Ltd
- Type: Private
- Industry: Digital cinema
- Founded: 1927; 99 years ago
- Founder: John Logie Baird
- Defunct: July 24, 2012; 14 years ago
- Fate: Liquidation; assets and intellectual property acquired by Blackmagic Design

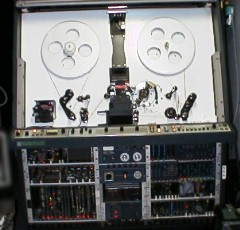
Rank Cintel Mark 3

Cintel was a British digital cinema company founded in 1927 by John Logie Baird and based in Ware, Hertfordshire. The early company was called Cinema Television Ltd. Cinema Television was sold to J Arthur Rank Organization renamed Rank Cintel in 1958. It specialized in the design and manufacture of professional post-production equipment, for transcribing film into video or data formats. It was formerly part of the Rank Organisation. Along with a line of telecines, Rank Cintel made 3 tube RGB color video projectors in the 1960s.

Their main products were based on either cathode ray tube (CRT) Flying-spot scanner or charge-coupled device (CCD) technology. ITK founded in 1994, also made upgrade products include the TWiGi system, the SCAN’dAL and the Y-Front.

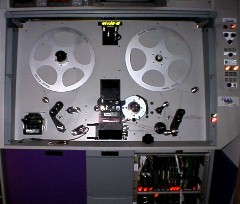
Cintel URSA Diamond

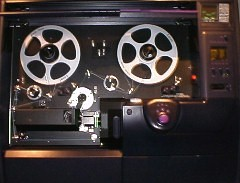
Cintel C-Reality Film Deck

The parts of a flying spot scanner: (A) Cathode-ray tube (CRT); (B) photon beam; (C) & (D) dichroic mirrors; (E), (F) & (G) red-, green- and blue-sensitive photomultipliers.

Many movies and TV shows for TV were transferred from film to TV on Cintel Telecines. Cintel saw reduced sales with the introduction of Spirit DataCine in 1996. The business was in administration until its announced liquidation. On 24 July 2012 Blackmagic Design acquired the assets of Cintel.

== History ==
- 1927 John Logie Baird founds the Baird Television Company, which later becomes Cinema-Television.
- 1940 Gaumont-British acquires Cinema-Television.
- 1941 The Rank Organisation takes control of Gaumont-British and Cinema-Television.
- During the Second World War, Cinema-Television supplies thousands of specialist photoelectric cells, and cathode ray tubes for the war effort.
- 1945 Cinema-Television acquires Bush Radio.
- 1950 The first flying spot telecine was installed at the BBC's Lime Grove Studios.
- 1958 Cinema-Television Limited was renamed Rank Cintel Limited.
- 1946 TMk1 shown using a polygonal prism system, it was the first 35mm continuous Motion Flying Spot Telecine.
- 1964 The model Mk II Telecine with twin lens was shown it supported both 35mm and 16mm.
- 1967 The Flying Spot Color Slide Scanner made, with two slides with manual changeover.
- 1975 The Model Mk III used a new system called jump scan Analog.
- 1977 The first Rank Cintel Flying Spot Scanner was introduced into North America by MPV, (Motion Picture Video Corporation, Toronto) and the first colorist and pan & scan operator was the then president Bob Sher.
- 1977 Mk IIIC was the next generation Digiscan, with improvements
- 1980 Cintel introduced the Ferrit Sound Follower for double system separate magnetic sound.
- 1982 ADS-1 a CCD Telecine shown
- 1987 the model MK IIIB was shown it used a progressive scan CRT and a Digiscan system to make SDTV.
- 1987 ADS-2 a CCD Telecine shown
- 1987 MK3C Digiscan with 4 4:2:2 outputs and Ref Frame
- 1988 ADS-8 CCD slide scanner with standard Kodak slide carousels.
- 1988 the Rank Cintel Mk III with HDTV high definition was shown at the International Broadcasting Convention in Brighton, England.
- 1989 the Ursa 4:2:2 with D1 color space output was shown.
- 1993 the Ursa Gold with 4:4:4 output was shown.
- 1997 the Ursa Diamond, with many third-party improvements added was shown.
- OSCAR was added as an optical dust and scratch removal system for their telecines.
- C-Reality was a HD telecine with a Data option for DI work.
- 2002 the DSX telecine HD and Data was shown.
- 2002 Cintel acquired Innovation TK, including the Millennium HD and Data Telecine.
- 2003 Cintel launches GRACE, an internal Film Grain Reducer option for C-Reality and DSX machines
- Millennium II
- 2004 they shown the dataMill fast data scanner based on Millennium 2 technology
- 2004 the GRACE system was shown as an external film grain reducer
- Millennium HD
- ImageMill 1 (video)
- 2005 diTTo - was shown as a low end 2K data scanner, with a 3K native sensor
- diTTo Evolution
- ImageMill 2 ( data)
- OCEAN controller

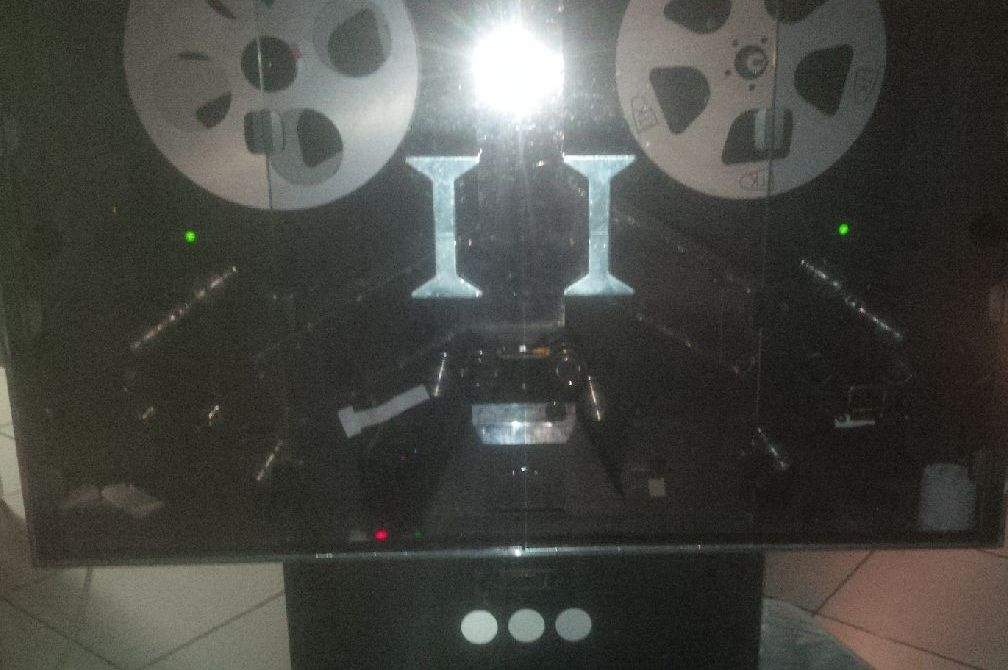
Innovation TK Ltd Millennium Machine

== Innovation TK ==
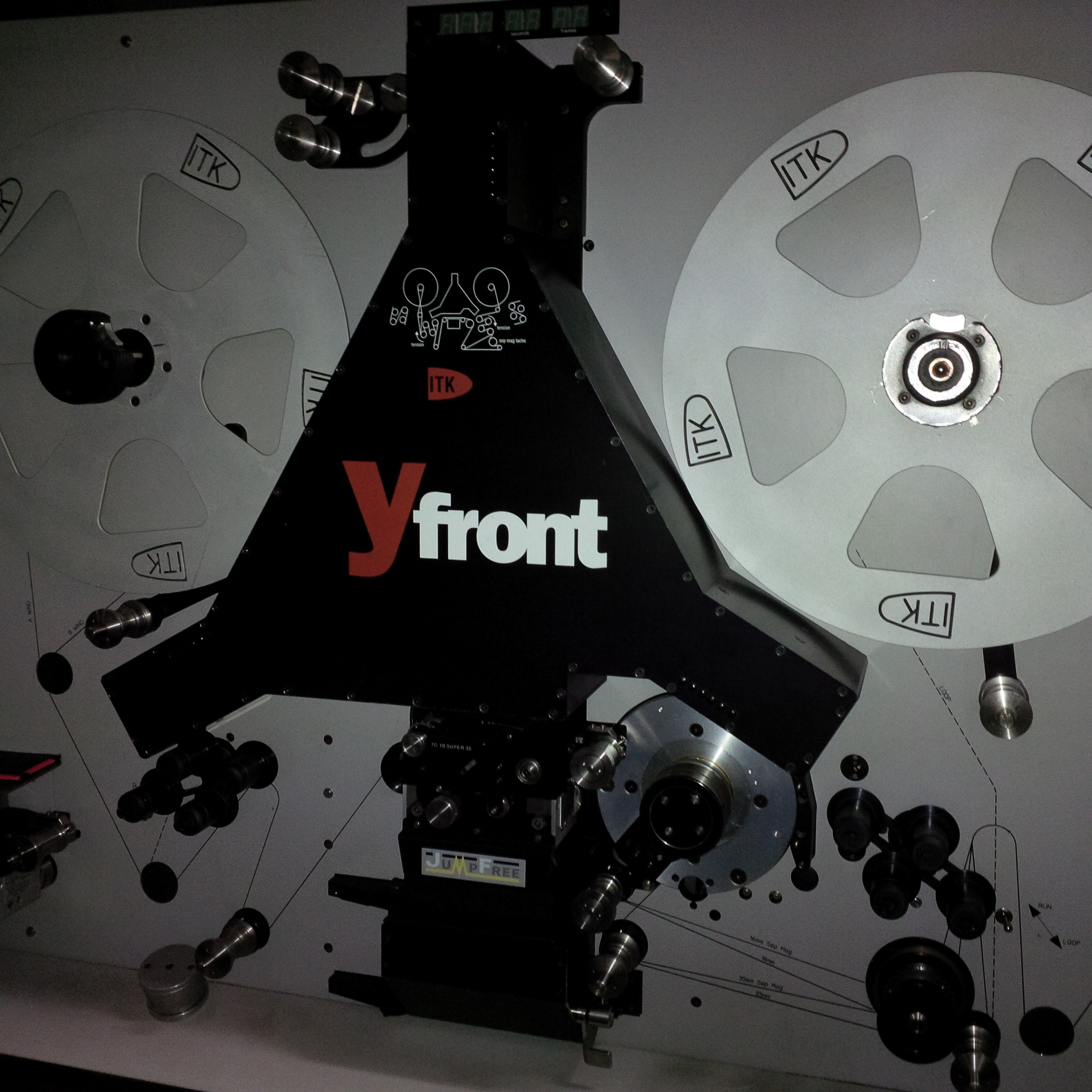
Innovation TK Y-Front Telecine

Innovation TK Ltd, ITK, was founded in 1994. In 2002 Cintel acquired Innovation TK, including the Millennium HD and Millennium Data Telecine.

== See also ==
- Test film
- 3D LUT
- Color motion picture film
- Color suite
- Da Vinci Systems for color grading and video editing systems.
- Pandora International
