= R5 (bootleg) =

Type of bootleg recording

R5, in the film business, is a DVD of a movie sold in Russia very soon after the first screening in cinema, at reduced wholesale prices. It is made with a telecine machine from an analog source and is typically of a lower quality than other retail releases.

== Overview ==
Telecine (TK) is the digitization performed by the studio itself, usually from an analog film print. The purpose of it is to create a high-quality digital copy (usually for a later DVD release). But unlike a DVD, an R5 is released before the digital post-processing is finished. The quality of the rips can widely differ, but an R5 can be almost indistinguishable from a DVD rip since many unauthorized film copies are published onto DVD with minimal editing. Cyrillic letters can be seen in the movie picture when text is replaced by Russian.

This digital post-processing is an important step, and provides many qualitative benefits to the finished conversion and should not be under-appreciated. From color correction to grain removal/reduction there are many steps that improve the transfer that generally the R5 does not have, even if done by the originating studio.

The name R5 refers to DVD Region 5. In an effort to compete with copyright infringement in these areas, the movie industry chose to create a new format for DVD releases that could be produced more quickly and less expensively than traditional DVD releases. R5 releases differ from normal releases in that they often lack both the image post-processing and special features that are common on DVD releases. This allows the film to be released for sale at the same time that DVD screeners are released. Since these screeners are the chief source of high-quality pre-DVD release unauthorized film copies (in comparison to cam or telesync, mostly), this allows the movie studios to beat the infringers to market. Bootlegged copies of these releases are often distributed on the internet and in some cases, R5 DVDs may be released without an English audio track, requiring the encoder to use the direct line audio from the film's theatrical release. In this case, the unauthorized release will be tagged with "LiNE" to distinguish it from a release with a DVD audio track. Before PUKKA/DREAMLiGHT introduced the R5 tag to the warez scene, the R5 releases were tagged as TC, DVDSCR or DVDRip.

The image quality of an R5 release is generally comparable to a DVD Screener release, except without the added scrolling text and black and white scenes that serve to distinguish screeners from commercial DVD releases. R5 quality can be somewhat better than transfers produced by movie bootleggers because the transfer is performed using professional-grade film scanning equipment.
