= Pirated movie release types =

Formats of illegally-distributed movies

Pirated movie release types are the different types of movies and television series that are shared via online piracy — shared illicitly over the Internet. The quality and popularity of pirated movie release types vary widely, due to the different sources and methods used for acquiring the video content, the development and adoption of encoding formats, and differing preferences on the part of suppliers and end users as to quality and size-efficiency.

Pirated movie releases may be derived from cams, which have distinctly low quality; screener and workprint discs or digital distribution copies (DDC), telecine copies from analog reels, video on demand (VOD) or TV recordings, and DVD and Blu-ray rips. They are seen in peer-to-peer file sharing networks, pirated websites and rarely on video sharing websites such as YouTube and Dailymotion due to their strict copyright rules.

Pirated movies are usually released in many file formats and different versions as better sources become available. The versions are usually encoded in the popular formats (e.g .mp4 or .mkv) at the time of encoding. The sources for pirated copies have often changed with time in response to technology or anti-piracy measures.

== Cams ==
Cam releases are a form of movie piracy which involve recording the on-screen projection of a movie in a movie theater. This enables groups to pirate movies which are in their theatrical period (not released for personal entertainment). This method often results in distinctly low quality and requires undetected videotaping in a movie theater.

== Pre-release ==
Beginning in 1998, feature films began to be released on the internet by warez groups prior to their theatrical release. These pirated versions usually came in the form of VCD or SVCD. A prime example was the release of American Pie. This is notable for three reasons:

1. It was released in an uncensored workprint format. The later theatrical release was cut down by several minutes and had scenes reworked to avoid nudity to pass MPAA guidelines.
2. It was released nearly two months prior to its release in theaters (CNN Headline News reported on its early release).
3. It was listed by the studio as one of the reasons it released an unrated DVD edition.

== DVD and VOD ripping ==
=== DivX ===
In October 1999, DeCSS was released. This program enables anyone to remove the CSS encryption on a DVD. Although its authors only intended the software to be used for playback purposes, it also meant that one could decode the content perfectly for ripping; combined with the DivX 3.11 Alpha codec released shortly after, the new codec increased video quality from near VHS to almost DVD quality when encoding from a DVD source.

=== Xvid ===
The early DivX releases were mostly internal for group use, but once the codec spread, it became accepted as a standard and quickly became the most widely used format for the scene. With help from associates who either worked for a movie theater, movie production company, or video rental company, groups were supplied with massive amounts of material, and new releases began appearing at a very fast pace. When version 4.0 of DivX was released, the codec went commercial and the need for a free codec, Xvid (then called "XviD", "DivX" backwards), was created. Later, Xvid replaced DivX entirely. Although the DivX codec has evolved from version 4 to 10.6 during this time, it is banned in the warez scene due to its commercial nature.

=== x264 ===
In February 2012, a consortium of popular piracy groups officially announced x264, the free H.264 codec, as the new standard for releases, replacing the previous format, which was Xvid wrapped in an AVI container. The move to H.264 also obsoletes AVI in favor of MP4 and Matroska that most commonly uses the .mkv file name extension.

=== x265 (HEVC) ===
With the increasing popularity of online movie-streaming sites like Netflix, some movies are being ripped from such websites now and are being encoded in HEVC wrapped in Matroska containers. This codec allows a high-quality movie to be stored in a relatively smaller file size.

=== AV1 ===
AV1 is a free modern video format developed by the Alliance for Open Media (AOM). It delivers high quality video at lower bitrates than H.264 or even H.265/HEVC. Unlike HEVC, it can be streamed in common web browsers. It is being adopted by YouTube and Netflix, amongst others. As of 2026, a few encoders use AV1.

== Release formats ==
Below is a table of pirated movie release types along with respective sources, ranging from the lowest quality to the highest. Scene rules define in which format and way each release type is to be packaged and distributed.

Type	Label	Popularity
Cam	CAM-Rip; CAM; HDCAM	Common; low video and sound quality
Telesync	TS; HDTS; TELESYNC; PDVD; PreDVDRip	Uncommon
Workprint	WP; WORKPRINT	Extremely rare
Telecine	TC; HDTC; TELECINE	Very rare
Pay-Per-View Rip	PPV; PPVRip	Very rare, WEB-DL is preferred
Screener	SCR; SCREENER; DVDSCR; DVDSCREENER; BDSCR; WEBSCREENER	Uncommon
Digital Distribution Copy or Downloadable/Direct Digital Content	DDC	Rare
R5	R5; R5.LINE; R5.AC3.5.1.HQ	Rare
DVD-Rip	DVDRip; DVDMux; DVDR; DVD-Full; Full-Rip; ISO rip; lossless rip; untouched rip; DVD-5; DVD-9	Formerly common lossless DVD format whose popularity has diminished in favor of higher quality Blu-Ray releases
HDTV, PDTV or DSRip	DSR; DSRip; SATRip; DTHRip; DVBRip; HDTV; PDTV; DTVRip; TVRip; HDTVRip	Common, often used for TV programs
VODRip	VODRip; VODR	Very rare, WEB-DL is preferred
HC HD-Rip	HC; HD-Rip	Common, WEB-DL is some times preferred
WEBCap	WEB-Cap; WEBCAP; WEB Cap	Rare, WEBRip is preferred
HDRip	HDRip; WEB-DLRip	Common, WEBRip is preferred
WEBRip	WEBRip (P2P); WEB Rip (P2P); WEB-Rip (P2P)	Very common, WEB-DL is preferred but not as available as WEBRip is
WEB-DL (P2P)	WEBDL; WEB DL; WEB-DL; WEB (Scene); WEBRip (extremely common)	Very common, although WEBRips are often mislabeled as WEB-DL when they have been re-encoded from a WEB-DL source.
Blu-ray/BD/BRRip	Blu-Ray; BluRay; BLURAY; BDRip; BRip; BRRip; BDR; BD25; BD50; BD66; BD100; BD5; BD9; BDMV; BDISO; COMPLETE.BLURAY	Very common. Blu-ray and 4K Blu-ray make up a large share of the market, despite each segment making up a smaller market share than DVD by itself.
4K	CBR; VBR	Uncommon. 4K (2160p) content released in Constant Bit-Rate (CBR) and Variable Bit-Rate (VBR) with emphasis on quality.

=== Cam / Cam Rip ===
A Cam is a copy made in a movie theater using a camcorder or mobile phone. The sound source is the camera microphone. Cam rips can quickly appear online after the first preview or premiere of the film. The quality ranges from subpar to adequate, depending on the group of persons performing the recording and the resolution of the camera used. The main disadvantage of this is the sound quality. The microphone does not only record the sound from the movie, but also the background sound in a movie theater. The camera can also record movements and audio of the audience in a movie theater, for instance, when someone stands up in front of the screen, or when the audience laughs at a comedic moment in the film.

=== Telesync ===
A telesync (TS) is a bootleg recording of a film recorded in a movie theater, sometimes filmed using a professional camera on a tripod in the projection booth. The main difference between a CAM and TS copy is that the audio of a TS is captured with a direct connection to the sound source (often an FM microbroadcast provided for the hearing-impaired, or from a drive-in theater). Often, a cam is mislabeled as a telesync. HDTS is used to label a High-definition video recording. Sometimes, Cam and TS releases can contain subtitles. At the point in a Cam or Telesync's release, there will not have been an official digital or physical release. Therefore, some releases use AI tools to automatically generate subtitles, leaving inaccurate results.

=== Workprint ===
A Workprint is a copy made from an unfinished version of a film produced by the studio. Typically, a workprint has missing effects and overlays, and differs from its theatrical release. Some workprints have a time index marker running in a corner or on the top edge; some may also include a watermark. A workprint might be an uncut version, and missing some material that would appear in the final movie (or including scenes later cut).

=== Telecine ===
A telecine is a copy captured from a film print using a machine that transfers the movie from its analog reel to digital format. These were rare because telecine machines for making these prints were very costly and very large. However, they have recently become much more common. Telecine has basically the same quality as DVD, since the technique is the same as digitizing the actual film to DVD. However, the result is inferior since the source material is usually a lower quality copy reel. Telecine machines usually cause a slight left-right jitter in the picture and have inferior color levels compared to DVD. HDTC is used to label a High-definition video recording.

=== DCP Rip / Theater ===
A Digital Cinema Package, often abbreviated DCP, is a set of files sent by distributors to the theaters playing the content. DCPs are usually encrypted using an asymmetric scheme, the distributor issues Key Delivery Messages (KDMs) to control who or what can decrypt and play anything. There is little evidence that releases made from decrypted DCP files actually exist, but some unencrypted and accidentally published ones do. DCPs usually take up hundreds of gigabytes because of the video and audio bitrates. Aside from Blu-ray releases, they are in general the highest quality source.

=== PPV Rip ===
PPVRips come from Pay-Per-View sources. All the PPVRip releases are brand new movies which have not yet been released to Screener or DVD, but are available for viewing by customers with high-end TV package deals.

=== Screener ===
Screeners are early DVD or BD releases of the theatrical version of a film, typically sent to movie reviewers, Academy members, and executives for review purposes. A screener normally has a message overlaid on its picture, with wording similar to: "The film you are watching is a promotional copy. If you purchased this film at a retail store, please contact 1-800-NO-COPYS to report it." or more commonly if released for awards consideration simply, "FOR YOUR CONSIDERATION." Apart from this, some movie studios release their screeners with a number of scenes of varying duration shown in black-and-white. Aside from this message, and the occasional B&W scenes, screeners are normally of only slightly lower quality than a retail DVD-Rip, due to the smaller investment in DVD mastering for the limited run. Some screener rips with the overlay message get cropped to remove the message and get released mislabeled as DVD-Rips.

Note: Screeners make a small exception here—since the content may differ from a retail version, it can be considered as lower quality than a DVD-Rip (even if the screener in question was sourced from a DVD).

=== DDC ===
A digital distribution copy (DDC) is basically the same as a Screener, but sent digitally (FTP, HTTP, etc.) to companies instead of via the postal system. This makes distribution cheaper. Its quality is lower than one of a R5, but higher than a Cam or Telesync.

In the warez scene DDC refers to Downloadable/Direct Digital Content which is not freely available.

=== R5 ===
An R5 is a studio produced unmastered telecine put out quickly and cheaply to compete against telecine piracy in Russia. The R5 tag refers to the DVD region 5 which consists of Russia, the Indian subcontinent, most of Africa, North Korea, and Mongolia. R5 releases differ from normal releases in that they are a direct Telecine transfer of the film without any of the image processing. If the DVD does not contain an English-language audio track, the R5 video is synced to a previously released English audio track. Then a LiNE tag is added. This means that the sound often is not as good as DVD-Rips. To account for the lesser audio quality typically present in R5 releases, some release groups take the high quality Russian or Ukrainian 5.1 channel audio track included with the R5 DVD and modify it with audio editing software. They remove the non-English spoken portion of the audio and sync the remaining portion, which contains high quality sound effects and music with a previously recorded source of English vocals usually taken from a LiNE tagged release. The result of this process is an almost retail DVD quality surround sound audio track which is included in the movie release. Releases of this type are normally tagged AC3.5.1.HQ and details about what was done to the audio track as well as the video are present in the release notes accompanying the pirated movie.

=== DVD Rip ===
A DVD-Rip is a final retail version of a film, typically released before it is available outside its originating region. Often after one group of pirates releases a high-quality DVD-Rip, the "race" to release that film will stop. The release is an AVI file and uses the XviD codec (some in DivX) for video, and commonly mp3 or AC3 for audio. Because of their high quality, DVD-Rips generally replace any earlier copies that may already have been circulating. PAL DVD-Rips of movies are generally sourced from the Region 2/UK DVDs, Widescreen DVDs used to be indicated as WS.DVDRip. DVDMux differs from DVDRips as they tend to use the x264 codec for video, AAC or AC3 codec for audio and multiplex it on a .mp4/.mkv file.

=== DVD-R ===
DVD-R refers to a final retail version of a film in DVD format, generally a complete copy from the original DVD. If the original DVD is released in the DVD-9 format, however, extras might be removed and/or the video re-encoded to make the image fit the less expensive for burning and quicker to download DVD-5 format. DVD-R releases often accompany DVD-Rips. DVD-R rips are larger in size, generally filling up the 4.37 or 7.95 GiB provided by DVD-5 and DVD-9 respectively. Untouched or lossless rips in the strictest sense are 1:1 rips of the source, with nothing removed or changed, though often the definition is lightened to include DVDs which have not been transcoded, and no features were removed from the user's perspective, removing only restrictions and possible nuisances such as copyright warnings and movie previews.

=== TV Rip ===
TVRip is a capture source from an analog capture card (coaxial/composite/s-video connection). Digital satellite rip (DSR, also called SATRip or DTH) is a rip that is captured from a non-standard definition digital source like satellite. HDTV stands for captured source from HD television, while PDTV (Pure Digital TV) stands for any SDTV rip captured using solely digital methods from the original transport stream, not from HDMI or other outputs from a decoder, it can also refer to any standard definition content broadcast on a HD channel. DVB rips often come from free-the-air transmissions (such as digital terrestrial television). With an HDTV source, the quality can sometimes even surpass DVD. Movies in this format are starting to grow in popularity. Network logos can be seen, and some advertisement and commercial banner can be observed on some releases during playback.

Analog, DSR, and PDTV sources used to be often reencoded to 512×384 if fullscreen, currently to 640x480 if fullscreen and 720x404 if widescreen. HDTV sources are reencoded to multiple resolutions such as 720x404 (360p), 960×540 (540p), 1280×720 (720p), and 1920x1080 (1080p) at various file sizes for pirated releases. They can be progressive scan captured or not (480i digital transmission or 1080i broadcast for HD caps).

=== VOD Rip ===
VODRip stands for Video-on-demand rip. This can be done by recording or capturing a video/movie from an On-Demand service such as through a cable or satellite TV service. Most services will state that ripping or capturing films is a breach of their use policy, but it is becoming more and more popular as it requires little technology or setup. There are many online On-Demand services that would not require one to connect their TV and computer. It can be done by using software to identify the video source address and downloading it as a video file which is often the method that bears the best quality end result. However, some people have used screen cams which effectively record, like a video camera, what is on a certain part of the computer screen, but does so internally, making the quality not of HD quality, but nevertheless significantly better than a Cam or Telesync version filmed from a movie theater, TV or computer screen.

=== HC HD Rip ===
In a HC HDRip, HC stands for hard-coded subtitles. This format is released shortly after the movie leaves theaters. It is usually sourced from Korean VOD services like Naver.

The quality of this release is lower than a WEB as it is screen recorded, and it is a less preferred option due to the subtitles being baked into the video and cannot be removed, hence the HC tag. P2P groups have released blurred copies, which have the subtitles blurred or blocked.

=== Web Capture ===
A WEBCap is a rip created by capturing video from a DRM-enabled streaming service, such as Amazon Prime Video or Netflix. Quality can range from mediocre (comparable with low quality XVID encodes) to excellent (comparable with high quality BR encodes). Essentially, the quality of the image obtained depends on internet connection speed and the specifications of the recording machine. WEBCaps nowadays are labeled as WEBRips, thus making this tag rare.

=== HDRip ===
HDRips are typically transcoded versions of HDTV or WEB-DL source files, but may be any type of HD transcode.

=== Web Rip ===
In a WEBRip (P2P), the file is often extracted using the HLS or RTMP/E protocols and remuxed from a TS, MP4 or FLV container to MKV.

This tag was used to indicate releases from streaming services with weak or no DRM in order to differentiate from iTunes's WEB-DL; however, it is generally used to tag the captured (and re-encoded) releases, much like WEBCap.

=== Web Download ===
WEB-DL (P2P) refers to a file losslessly ripped from a streaming service, such as Netflix, Amazon Video, Hulu, Crunchyroll, Discovery GO, BBC iPlayer, etc, or downloaded via an online distribution website such as iTunes. The quality is relatively good since they are "untouched" (not re-encoded) releases. The video (H.264 or H.265) and audio (AC3/AAC) streams are usually extracted from iTunes or Amazon Video and remuxed into a MKV container without sacrificing quality. An advantage with these releases is that, like BD/DVDRips, they usually have no onscreen network logos unlike TV rips. A disadvantage is that if there are normally subtitles for scenes in other languages, they often aren't found in these releases. Some releases are still mislabeled as WEBRip.

=== BDRip / Blu-ray ===
Blu-ray or Bluray rips (once known as BDRip) are taken directly from a Blu-ray disc source (usually from the Region A/USA Blu-rays); they have a resolution of 2160p, 1080p or 720p (depending on the source), and use the x264 or x265 codec (depending on the source). They can be ripped from BD25, BD50 disc (or Ultra HD Blu-ray at higher resolutions or bitrates), and even remuxes. BDRip now refers to a Blu-ray source that has been encoded to a lower resolution (i.e. 1080p down to 720p/576p/480p). BDRips can go from 2160p to 1080p, etc, as long as they go downward in resolution of the source disc. BRRips, which are often mistaken for BDRips, are the result of taking an already encoded video at high definition resolution and transcoding to another resolution (usually standard definition). BDRips are not a transcode, but BRRips are, which change their quality. BD/BRRips in DVDRip resolutions can vary between XviD/x264/x265 codecs (commonly 700 MB and 1.5 GB in size as well as larger DVD5 or DVD9: 4.5 GB or 8.4 GB). Size fluctuates depending on the length and quality of releases, but the higher the size the more likely they use the x264/x265 codecs. A BD/BRRip to a lower resolution looks better, regardless, because the encode is from a higher quality source. BDRips have followed the above guideline after Blu-ray replaced the BDRip title structure in Warez scene releases.

Full BD25/BD50 data rips also exist, and are similar to their counterpart DVD5/DVD9 full data releases. They are AVCHD compatible using the BD folder structure (sometimes called Bluray RAW/m2ts/iso), and are usually intended to be burnt back to disk for play in AVCHD-compatible Blu-ray players. BD25/BD50 data rips may or may not be remuxed and are never transcoded. UHD data rips also exist. In scene releases, full copy of the Blu-ray Disc is called "COMPLETE.BLURAY" or "BDISO" when in a .iso file format, meanwhile full copy of Ultra HD Blu-ray discs is called "COMPLETE.UHD.BLURAY".

BD and BRRips come in various versions:

m-720p (or mini 720p)
a compressed version of a 720p and usually sized at around 2–3 GB. Currently uncommon. Movie piracy sites such as RARBG and YTS has its own compressed versions of the movies released on these sites, tagged as 1080p.
720p
usually around 4–7 GB and is the most downloaded form of BDRip.
m-1080p (or mini 1080p)
usually a little bit larger than 720p.
1080p
can be anywhere from 8 GB to as large as 40–60 GB.
mHD (or mini HD)
encoded in the same resolution but at a lower bitrate and are smaller in size.
μHD (or micro HD)
fine-tuned AVC+AC3 encoding in an MP4 container aimed at 1 to 3 GB per feature movie, keeping 1920 pixels of horizontal resolution with a 2 to 2.5 Mbit/s.

=== Common tags ===
Notation	Meaning
CBR	Constant Bit-Rate
DS4K	4K downscaled less than its original resolution.
MULTi	The release has a minimum of 2 audio languages.
MULTiSUBS / Multi-Subs	The release has a minimum of 6 subtitle languages.
PROPER	A corrected version released by a different group.
REPACK	A corrected version released by the same group that issued the original release.
RM4K	4K remaster in 1080p.
VBR	Variable Bit-Rate

=== Common abbreviations for digital platforms ===
Notation	Source
9NOW	9Now (Australia)
A3P	Atresplayer (Spain)
AE	A&E
ABC	American Broadcasting Company
AJAZ	Al Jazeera English (Qatar)
ALL4	Channel 4 (United Kingdom)
AMC	AMC
AMZN	Amazon Studios / Amazon Prime Video
ANGL	Angel Studios (United States)
ANLB	AnimeLab (Australia)
ANPL	Animal Planet (United States)
AOTG	Astro (Malaysia)
APPS	Disney+ MENA
ARD	ARD (Germany)
AS	Adult Swim
ATVP	Apple TV+
AUBC	Australian Broadcasting Corporation (Australia)
BCORE	Sony Pictures Core (formerly Bravia Core)
BK	Bentkey
BNGE	Binge (Australia)
BOOM	Boomerang
BRAV	BravoTV
CBC	Canadian Broadcasting Corporation / CBC Gem (Canada)
CBS	CBS
CC	Comedy Central
CHGD	CHRGD (Canada)
CINEAR	Cine.ar (Argentina)
CLBI	Club illico (Canada)
CMAX	Cinemax
CMOR	C More (Sweden) (Denmark) (Finland) (Norway)
CMT	Country Music Television
CN	Cartoon Network
CNB	Cinobo
CNBC	CNBC
CNLP	Canal+ (France)
COOK	Cooking Channel
CR	Crunchyroll
CRAV	Crave (Canada)
CRIT	Criterion Channel
CRKL	Crackle
CRKI	Chorki (Bangladesh)
CSPN	C-SPAN
CTV	CTV (Canada)
CUR	Curiosity Stream
CW	The CW
CWS	CW Seed
DCU	DC Universe
DDY	Digiturk Dilediğin Yerde (Turkey)
DEKKOO	Dekkoo
DEST	Destination America
DF	DramaFever
DISC	Discovery Channel
DIY	DIY Network
DOCPLAY	DocPlay
DPLY	dplay (Rebranded as Discovery+)
DRPO	Dropout
DRTV	DR TV (Denmark)
DSCP	Discovery+
DSNP / DSPA	Disney+
DSNY	Disney Networks (Disney Channel, Disney XD, Disney Jr.)
DTV	DirecTV Stream (formerly DirecTV Now and AT&T TV)
DW / DLWP	DailyWire+
EPIX / MGMP	EPIX MGM+ (formerly known as Epix)
ESPN	ESPN
ESQ	Esquire
ETTV	El Trece (Argentina)
ETV	E!
FAH / FAND / FDNG	Fandango at Home (formerly Vudu)
FAM	Family (Canada)
FBWatch	Facebook Watch
FJR	Family Jr (Canada)
FLMN	Filmin
FOOD	Food Network
FOX	Fox Broadcasting Company
FPT	FPT Play (Vietnam)
FREE	Freeform
FSTV	Fawesome TV (United States)
FTV	France.tv
FUNI	Funimation
FXTL	Foxtel Now (formerly Foxtel Play)
FYI	FYI Network
GAGA	GagaOOLala
GC	NHL GameCenter (United States)
GLBL	Global (Canada)
GLOB	GloboSat Play (Brazil)
GLBO	Globoplay (Brazil)
GO90	go90
GPLAY	Google Play
HBO	HBO
HGTV	HGTV
HIDI	HIDIVE
HIST	History Channel
HLMK	Hallmark
HMAX / MAX	Max
HPLAY	Hungama Play (India)
HTSR / HS / JHS	Hotstar (India)
HULU	Hulu Networks
iP	BBC iPlayer (United Kingdom)
iQ / iQIYI	IQIYI
iT	iTunes
ITV / ITVX	ITV (United Kingdom)
IVI	Ivi.ru (Russia)
JC	JioCinema (India)
JOYN	Joyn (Germany)
KAYO	Kayo Sports (Australia)
KCW / KOCOWA	Kocowa+ (Wavve Americas) (South Korea)
Le / LeTV	Le.com (China)
KF	KlikFilm Productions (Indonesia)
KNOW	Knowledge Network (Canada)
KNPY	Kanopy
KPN	KPN (Netherlands)
KS	Kaleidescape (United States)
LGP	Lionsgate Play
LIFE	Lifetime
LN	Love Nature (Canada)
MA	Movies Anywhere
MBC	MBC (South Korea)
MGLN	MagellanTV
MMAX	ManoramaMAX (India)
MNBC	MSNBC
MS	Microsoft Store
MTOD	Motor Trend OnDemand (United States)
MTV	MTV Networks
MUBI	Mubi
MY5	Channel 5 (United Kingdom)
MONO / MONOMAX	MONOMAX (formerly Doonung.com) (Thailand)
MP	Movistar Plus
NATG	National Geographic
NBA	NBA League Pass
NBC	National Broadcasting Company
NBLA	Nebula
NF	Netflix
NFB	National Film Board of Canada
NFL	NFL Network
NFLN	NFL Now
NICK	Nickelodeon
NOS	NOS / NOS Studios+ (Portugal)
NOW	NOW (formerly Now TV) (United Kingdom)
NRK	Norsk Rikskringkasting (Norway)
ODK	OnDemandKorea (South Korea)
OPTO	OPTO (SIC) (Portugal)
OSN	OSN+ (United Arab Emirates)
OVID	OVID.tv
OXGN	Oxygen
PBS	PBS
PBSK	PBS KIDS
PCOK	Peacock
PLAY	Google Play
PLEX	Plex
PLUZ	Pluzz (recently france.tv) (France)
PMNT	Paramount Network
PMTP	Paramount Plus
POGO	PokerGO
PSN	PlayStation Network
PUHU	puhutv (Turkey)
QIBI	Quibi
RED	YouTube Premium (formerly YouTube Red)
RKTN	Rakuten TV
ROKU	Roku
RSTR	Rooster Teeth
RTE	RTÉ (Republic of Ireland)
RTP / RTPPLAY	RTP (Portugal)
SAINA / SP	Saina Play (India)
SBS	SBS (Australia)
SESO	Seeso
SFAT	SF Anytime (Denmark) (Finland) (Norway) (Sweden)
SHDR	Shudder
SHM	ShemarooMe (India)
SHMI	Shomi (Canada)
SHO	Showtime
SKST	SkyShowtime
SLNG	Sling TV
SNET	Sportsnet (Canada)
SNXT	Sun NXT (India)
SPIK	Spike
SPRT	Sprout
SS	Simply South (India)
STAN	Stan (Australia)
STMZ	Streamz (Belgium)
STRP	Star+
STZ	STARZ
SVT	Sveriges Television (Sweden)
SYFY	SyFy
TEN	10Play (formerly known as Tenplay) (Australia)
TID	TrueID (Thailand)
TIMV	TIMvision (formerly Cubovision) (Italy)
TK	Tentkotta (India)
TLC	TLC
TOU	Ici TOU.TV (France)
TRVL	Travel Channel
TUBI	TubiTV
TV3	TV3 (Republic of Ireland)
TV4	TV4 (Sweden)
TVING	TVING (South Korea)
TVL	TV Land
TVNZ	TVNZ (New Zealand)
UFC	UFC
UKTV	UKTV (United Kingdom)
UNIV	Univision
USAN	USA Network
VH1	VH1
VIAP	Viaplay (Sweden) (Finland)
VICE	Viceland (also known as Vice TV in the United States)
VIKI	Viki
VK	VK Video
VLCT	Discovery Velocity (Canada)
VMEO	Vimeo
VRV	VRV Defunct (consolidated into Crunchyroll)
VTRN	VET Tv
WNET	W Network (Canada)
WOWP	WOW Presents Plus
WTCH	Watcha (South Korea)
WWEN	WWE Network
XBOX	Xbox Video
YT	YouTube / YouTube Movies / YouTube TV
ZDF	ZDF (Germany)
ZEE5	ZEE5

=== Common abbreviations in Anime / Japanese shows ===
Notation	Source
ABC	Asahi Broadcasting Corporation
ABMA	Abema
ADN	Anime Digital Network (France)
ANIMAX	Animax
AO	Anime Onegai (Latin America)
AT-X	Anime Theatre X
Baha	Bahamut Animation Madness (Taiwan) (Hong Kong) (Macau)
B-Global / Bstation	Bilibili
BSP / NHK-BSP	NHK BS Premium
BS4	BS Nippon TV
BS5 / EX-BS / BS-EX	BS TV Asahi
BS6	BS-TBS
BS7 / BSJ / BS-TX	BS TV TOKYO
BS8 / BS-Fuji	BS Fuji
BS11	Nippon BS Broadcasting
BS12	BS12 トゥエルビ
CR	Crunchyroll
CS-Fuji ONE	Fuji TV One
CX	Fuji TV
DMM	DMM
EX	TV Asahi
CS3 / EX-CS1 / CS-EX1 / CSA	TV Asahi Channel 1
FOD	Fuji TV On Demand
FUNi	Funimation
HIDIVE / HIDI	HIDIVE
KBC	Kyushu Asahi Broadcasting
M-ON!	MUSIC ON! TV
MX	Tokyo MX
NHKG	NHK General TV
NHKE	NHK Education TV
NTV	Nippon TV
TBS	TBS Television
TX	TV TOKYO
UNXT / U-NEXT	U-NEXT
WAKA	Wakanim
WOWOW	Wowow
YTV	Yomiuri TV

In Japan, BS is Broadcast Satellite, CS is Communications Satellite, both are classified as satellite broadcasts.
