= Cigarette Burns (disambiguation) =

Cigarette burns are injuries caused by lit cigarettes.

Cigarette Burns may also refer to:

- Cue marks, a marking used in film
- "Cigarette Burns", an episode of Masters of Horror
- '"Cigarette Burns" (Dawson's Creek), a 2002 television episode
