= Cigarette Burns =

- Masters of Horror episode
- DVD cover for Cigarette Burns
- Episode no.: Season 1 Episode 8
- Directed by: John Carpenter
- Written by: Drew McWeeny; Rebecca Swan (as Scott Swan)
- Production code: 108
- Original air date: December 16, 2005
- Running time: 59 minutes

Guest appearances
- Udo Kier; Christopher Redman; Norman Reedus; Gwynyth Walsh

Episode chronology
← Previous "Deer Woman"	Next → "Fair-Haired Child"

"Cigarette Burns" is the eighth episode of the first season of Masters of Horror. A supernatural horror story, it features a film-within-a-film subplot. It originally aired in North America on December 16, 2005. The episode was directed by John Carpenter, while the score was composed by Carpenter's son Cody.

Fangoria placed Cigarette Burns at the top of their list of "12 Amazing Episodes of The Masters of Horror" series, describing it as "among the highest-rated episodes and a fan favorite."

== Plot ==
Deeply in debt to his dead fiancée's father, rare-films dealer Kirby Sweetman has less than a month to produce $200,000 to save his struggling theater. An old cinephile and film collector, Mr. Bellinger, hires him to find the sole print of a rare 30-year-old film titled La Fin Absolue du Monde (French: The Absolute End of the World). The film notoriously sparked a homicidal riot during its premiere at the 1971 Sitges Film Festival, after which it was destroyed. Bellinger leads Sweetman to a hidden room in his mansion, which contains an emaciated, unnaturally pale man (the Willowy Being) in chains; Bellinger introduces him as "one of the stars" of La Fin Absolue. The unhealed wounds on the man's shoulders appear to be the source of a pair of angelic wings, which Sweetman has seen mounted on a wall. The chained man explains that his existence is bound to the film's. Bellinger offers Sweetman $100,000 to find the film, which Sweetman negotiates up to $200,000.

Sweetman's first lead is reclusive New York critic A.K. Meyers, who wrote a review of the film. Meyers, who has become obsessed with the film to the point of madness (he is still writing his review 30 years later), gives Sweetman an audiotape of an interview with the film's director, Hans Backovic. Sweetman listens to the tape and hallucinates his fiancée's suicide: a junkie, Annie had slit her wrists in their bathtub.

The following day, in Paris, Sweetman meets with film archivist Henri Cotillard, who tells him that he was the projectionist at a secret screening of the film. He was spared death and insanity because he turned away as the film played. When he heard the audience screaming and smelled blood, he tried to stop the projector, but blacked out, waking later to find his left hand burned beyond use. He sends Sweetman to a contact, a filmmaker named Dalibor, who might know where the film is. Sweetman is seized, injected with an anesthetic, and blacks out, waking up tied to a chair. The woman who drove Sweetman there in her cab is also tied up and sitting across from him. The filmmaker explains to Sweetman (while decapitating the woman) that an angel was sacrificed in the film, and the evil of that horror affects all who view the film. Sweetman experiences another vision, and, when he comes to, he finds himself holding a machete. The filmmaker's throat is slashed. Before Dalibor dies, he directs Sweetman to Katja Backovic, the director's widow.

Sweetman tracks down and speaks with Katja in Vancouver. She gives Sweetman the only remaining copy of the film. When he asks how the director died, Katja reveals that he died in an attempted murder-suicide that she survived. Sweetman brings the film to Bellinger and collects his payment. Bellinger settles comfortably in his private theater, pours champagne, and watches the film. Sweetman returns to his cinema only to learn that Annie's father, Mr. Matthews, has chained it shut, even though he said Kirby had two weeks to pay off his debt. Not realizing that Matthews is watching him from a parked car, Kirby takes a call from distraught Bellinger and returns to the mansion. There, Sweetman sees Bellinger's butler, Fung, gouge his own eyes out after watching the film. Inside the projection room, Bellinger is concealed behind the movie equipment, gasping in apparent pain. He speaks deliriously, telling Kirby that he recommends the film, but that it is not a movie, only a trailer for what is to come. He gasps out that he has been inspired to create his own film. Kirby watches in horror as Bellinger loads his own intestines into the reels of another projector.

Matthews follows Sweetman to the mansion and is already being affected by the movie when Kirby re-enters the theater. Matthews, with crazed rants and giggles, pulls a gun and threatens to kill him. As they struggle, they hallucinate a burning cigarette cue mark, which envelops the screen. Sweetman awakens to find he and Matthews, both bloodied, are watching the movie. The butler blindly frees the chained Willowy Being. The ghost of Annie steps out of the movie and bites her father's neck, which turns out to be a hallucination. Sweetman decides that he and Mr. Matthews both have to die because neither can truly let Annie go as long as they are alive. Sweetman brutally kills Matthews, shoves the check given to him by Bellinger into his mouth with a curse, and commits suicide.

The Willowy Being takes the two film reels, walks into the theater, looks down at Sweetman's bloody corpse, and says, "Thank you for this", indicating the film reels, before leaving.

== Cast ==
- Norman Reedus as Kirby Sweetman
- Colin Foo as Fung
- Udo Kier as Bellinger
- Christopher Redman as the Willowy Being
- Chris Gauthier as Timpson
- Zara Taylor as Annie Matthews
- Gary Hetherington as Walter Matthews
- Christopher Britton as A.K. Meyers
- Julius Chapple as Henri Cotillard
- Taras Kostyuk as Kaspar
- Brad Kelly as Horst
- Lynn Wahl as Cab Driver
- Douglas Arthurs as Dalibor Huptman
- Gwynyth Walsh as Katja Backovic
- Brahm Taylor as Protagonist
- Christian Bocher as Hans Backovic (uncredited)

== Production ==
=== Filming ===
Filming took place in 2005. All Masters of Horror directors were given the same modest production budget and no restrictions on what they could make their film about. To save money, they used few film locations, which included Bellinger's mansion, Meyers' small home, Sweetman's movie theater, and its projection booth as screenwriters McWeeny and Swan envisioned them.

Location shooting took place in Vancouver, British Columbia, with stock footage establishing shots of Paris, France. The Vogue Theatre, at 918 Granville Street, stood in for Sweetman's cinema. Bellinger's Spanish Colonial Revival home scenes were shot at the Casa Mia heritage estate, at 1920 SW Marine Drive, also the filming location for other films with a fantasy and horror vibe. Katja Backovic's penthouse was filmed at 123 Davie Street.

Carpenter shot in the aspect ratio of 1.78:1, since the film was formatted for TV, rather than his usual 2.35:1 scope photography.

=== Special effects ===
Carpenter is recognized for his frequent collaborations with prominent actors and effects artists. He tapped Greg Nicotero, who had collaborated on several projects, including In the Mouth of Madness (1994) and Vampires (1998), and Howard Berger, who had also earlier worked on John Carpenter's Ghosts of Mars in 2001, as special makeup effects artists; they designed the appearance of the emaciated angel. Lee Wilson, who supervised the visual effects, had worked on David Cronenberg’s Videodrome (1983).

=== Props ===
When first seen, Kirby's movie theater is showing Profondo Rosso by Italian horror film director Dario Argento (English title: Deep Red). The episode's props include classic film posters (such as the 1922 Nosferatu) on the walls, which the Daily Dead website's film reviewer describes as "a smart shortcut to audience identification" for horror movie fans. Bellinger's large library-office has other memorabilia.

Various instruments of murder include a knife, a straight razor, a gun, and a machete. Bellinger uses a movie projector to commit suicide. The Willowy Being's pair of angelic wings are mounted on the wall in Bellinger's house as hunting trophies.

== Soundtrack ==
John Carpenter creates and performs the music for almost all of his own films, but his son, Cody Carpenter, scored the film, using a "fast moving piano melody, layers of low synth, and slight variations in chord and reverberation based on location and characters," with essential horror sound effects. Reviewer Patrick Bromley likened it to the Goblin score for Suspiria, the 1977 Italian supernatural horror film directed by Dario Argento.

Cody Carpenter composed theme music for the characters Bellinger, the Willowy Being, Kirby Sweetman, A.K. Meyers, Henri Cotillard, Dalibor, Katja Backovic, and Annie. Added themes were written for the locations of the Vogue Theatre, the Paris Archive, the Elevator Vision, and the projection booth.

The Le Fin De Mond theme was written by John Roome, and the main title music was composed by Edward Shearmur.

== Home media ==
The DVD was released by Anchor Bay Entertainment on March 28, 2006. The episode was the eighth episode and the first to be released on DVD. The episode appears on the first volume of the Blu-ray Disc compilation of the series.

A reviewer for the DVD Review & High Definition website wrote,

Anchor Bay Entertainment has created a wonderful transfer of the movie for this DVD. Presented in its original 1.77:1 widescreen aspect ratio, the transfer is enhanced for 16×9 TV set aspect ratios and is free of any defects. The contrast of the film is incredible, creating moody, dark shots with glaring highlights, without ever bleeding, blooming or losing definition. Colors are vibrant and natural-looking at all times. The level of detail in the transfer is very high bringing out even the slightest details in texture and fine gradients. No edge enhancement is evident in the presentation and the compression is without flaws. The audio presentation on the release comes as a 5.1 channel Dolby Digital track that is very effective. Making good use of the surround channels, the track is filled with subtle ambient noises and directional sound effects. [...] Dialogues are well integrated and always understandable.

The release includes a commentary track by John Carpenter; another featuring writers McWeeny and Swan; "Celluloid Apocalypse," an interview featurette with Carpenter; "Working With A Master"; "The Making Of Cigarette Burns" featurette; an on-set interview with Norman Reedus is available as a separate feature on the disc. Other features include a John Carpenter Biography, Trailers and a Still Gallery. With a DVD-ROM drive, the movie's screenplay and a screen saver are accessible.

== Reception ==
The episode received positive reviews. Fangoria included Cigarette Burns as their top-rated choice in their list of "12 Amazing Episodes of The Masters of Horror" series, describing it as "a fan favorite."

Nich Schager of Slant Magazine wrote that the film lacks Carpenter's "trademark cinemascope cinematography" and is too overt, but it is "something of an atmospheric semi-return to form". Steve Barton of Dread Central rated it 5/5 stars and called it "vintage Carpenter": "gory, disturbing, and at times beautiful to look at". Michael Drucker of IGN rated it 8/10 stars and described it as "fun, exciting, and horrifying", though he criticized the scenes of La Fin Absolue du Monde as poorly done. Ian Jane of DVD Talk rated it 3/5 stars and concluded that it is a "nice return to form from Carpenter that, despite some flaws, makes for an unsettling and atmospheric viewing".

== Legacy ==
In 2023, pop culture maven J. B. Spins deemed the episode to be Carpenter's "best work of the 21st Century thus far" and wrote, "With the passage of a few years, it also now looks quite 'influential,' as in it has been ripped off a few times." He praised the cast: "As you would expect, Kier is delightfully weird as Bellinger. Norman Reedus also does great work freaking out and stewing in his own guilt and remorse as Sweetman. In fact, the entire ensemble is consistently strong, in twitchy and sinister ways." Like DVD Review, he likened it to the 1998 film Ringu.

In a laudatory 2018 retrospective review, the Daily Dead website said that the installment is "the darkest and most intense episode" of the series and called it "a cool, imaginative story – one that draws us in and fills us with dread: we're never sure where it's going, but we know it's nowhere good. The stylization of Carpenter's direction never leans into film noir, but it's impossible to watch 'Cigarette Burns' and not be reminded of other horror noir like Alan Parker's Angel Heart and, in particular, Roman Polanski's The Ninth Gate." The reviewer said admiringly, "There is a nightmarish inevitability to the mystery at the center, in that we want to see it solved to satisfy our own curiosity about the resolution, but at the same time don't want to see Sweetman getting closer and closer to the truth because we know some form of Hell awaits him at the end of the trail. And boy are we right. There is an image near the end of 'Cigarette Burns' – involving Udo Kier and a film projector – that has stuck with me for the 13 years since I first saw the episode. It might be the most striking and horrifying image yet in all of Masters of Horror."

In 2020, the pop-culture website The Avocado praised the cast, calling Reedus "impressive" with "a wonderfully reactive presence," and Kier "terrifying" and "so charismatic onscreen that his sudden shifts in demeanor are as shocking as a murder in a slasher film." Overall, the reviewer called it "an incredibly theatrical work." Guido Henkel of DVD Review lauded Carpenter as "the master of suggestion, creating horror in the viewer's mind by not showing us details." Here, however, "he sidestepped this technique and gives us remarkable graphic shots and one of the most memorable death scenes of any horror film," producing "a surprisingly gory and overtly violent film for John Carpenter." Describing the movie as "In the Mouth of Madness meets Ringu," Henkel deems the episode "dark, disturbing and unsettling," highly atmospheric, and "a thoroughly enjoyable and suspenseful film."

"A standout from the first season of Masters of Horror," Sam Reader of Tor Nightfire wrote in 2022, before focusing on the film-within-a-film aspect. "Rumored to cause insanity and death at every screening, La Fin's presence is felt throughout the movie, as even searching for it or seeing it at a distance causes hallucinations, nightmares, disfigurement, and death. Carpenter's always been good at making things seem ominous and sinister even at the best of times, and the way the film alters anyone who's ever heard of it — from the crazy fan who directs snuff movies to the film critic who's writing a House of Leaves-style review to correct a perceived mistake — plays on this wonderfully, giving La Fin a sense of doom even before the movie shows up." Analyzing what he sees as a metacinematic style, Reader wrote, "Cigarette Burns also seems at times like a sendup, playing with the art/horror-noir touches while pushing them just far enough (blood sacrifices being an important ingredient in filmmaking, some effects that seem to blur the line between film artifice and "reality") that it plays on the border of the absurd. However you interpret it, it's a tight, twisty suspense film from one of the best genre directors out there, and worth the short time it takes to watch."

== See also ==
- Fury of the Demon
- Antrum
