= Antrum (film) =

2018 film directed by David Amito, Michael Laicini

- Theatrical release poster
- Directed by: David Amito; Michael Laicini
- Written by: David Amito; Michael Laicini
- Produced by: Alice Xandra Thirteen; David Bond; David Amito; Michael Laicini
- Starring: Nicole Tompkins; Rowan Smyth; Dan Istrate; Circus-Szalewski; Shu Sakimoto; Kristel Elling
- Cinematography: Maksymilian Milczarczyk
- Music by: Alicia Fricker
- Production company: Else Films
- Distributed by: Uncork'd Entertainment
- Release date: 14 October 2018 (Brooklyn Horror Film Festival)
- Running time: 95 minutes
- Country: Canada
- Languages: English; Romanian; Japanese

Antrum (also known as Antrum: The Deadliest Film Ever Made) is a 2018 Canadian horror film written and directed by David Amito and Michael Laicini. The film is divided into two parts: an opening and closing frame narrative in the form of a mockumentary and a feature film. The documentary purports to tell the story of Antrum, a movie released in 1979 that supposedly has deleterious effects on those who watch it, similar to the cursed film in Ring (1998). The bulk of the movie is allegedly the only known print of the film, which has itself been altered by an unknown third party.

Antrum was developed by Amito and Laicini while they were working on a separate project and brainstorming possible scenarios that they could include in the film. The central idea, that would later become the basis for Antrum, came from the concept of what it would be like to watch a purported "cursed" film, which the filmmakers felt would make for a great horror film. For the film's occult aspects, Amito and Laicini studied various historical and cultural depictions of demons and the devil, while further inspiration came from a short film by David B. Earle titled Dining Room or There is Nothing, which Laicini claimed to have seen while in film school. American actress Nicole Tompkins was cast in the lead role of Oralee, while child actor Rowan Smyth was cast in the role of her younger brother Nathan. Principal photography took place in Southern California, over a period of one month.

Antrum made its world premiere at the Brooklyn Horror Film Festival on 14 October 2018, and was screened at other film festivals, where it was nominated for several awards. Uncork’d Entertainment later acquired North American distribution rights to the film, later releasing it via Video-on-Demand and streaming services in Fall 2019. It received positive reviews from critics who praised its atmosphere, acting, and creativity, while some criticized its pacing, runtime, and plot.

== Plot ==
In 1983, a film titled Antrum was submitted to various film festivals, but none accepted it. After each rejection, the festival directors die under suspicious circumstances. In 1988, the film was shown at a theater in Budapest. During the screening, a fire — started by audience members — burned the theater to the ground.

In 1993, the film was screened in a California theater, where a concession stand worker dosed the popcorn with LSD. The combination of the drug and the film's imagery caused a riot in which a pregnant woman died. Following this screening, all copies of the film apparently vanished, and it earned a reputation as being cursed.

In 2018, a copy of Antrum surfaces, prompting a documentary crew to make a film about its history and impact. Scientists and experts who examine the 35 mm reel determine that the film utilizes disorienting sounds and subliminal imagery. The crew also finds disjointed black-and-white snippets that appear to be a snuff film spliced into the reel. The documentary pauses to present Antrum in its entirety for the first time in 25 years.

Antrum concerns siblings Oralee and Nathan, whose pet dog Maxine was recently euthanized. Asked whether Maxine went to Heaven, their mother teases Nathan, saying that Maxine has gone to Hell for being a bad dog, disturbing him. After a nightmare of Maxine attacking him unprovoked, a traumatized Nathan begins experiencing disturbing dreams and visions of demons.

To ease his mind, Oralee stages a ritual to allow Nathan to save Maxine's soul. She shows him a sketchbook filled with arcane sketches and drawings — presented as a grimoire obtained from a (non-existent) classmate named Ike. She takes Nathan to a nearby forest, and guides him through a series of rituals and "rites," intending for him to discover Maxine's collar — a "sign" they have saved her soul.

As the day progresses, however, Oralee is disturbed to find that her "spells" are apparently affecting the real world, conjuring actual infernal figures. Additionally, the pair accidentally interrupt a man attempting seppuku, and obliviously pass by the rotting corpse of a suicide near their campsite.

During their first night in the woods, Nathan sees a boat carrying a nude woman being rowed by a figure resembling Charon. He also hears a rattling chain that he attributes to Cerberus.

The next day, Nathan and Oralee stumble upon a pair of cannibals, who cook people alive inside an iron statue of Baphomet, including the man whose suicide attempt they earlier interrupted. When the cannibals notice them, the two abandon camp and row downriver in the boat Nathan saw the night before, but they both fall into the water. The pair makes it to shore, only to realize they have circled back to their camp. As they hide for the night, Oralee confesses the ruse to Nathan. However, Nathan claims to have met Ike, who told him not to trust her.

The next morning, the cannibals capture them. They prepare to cook Nathan, but Oralee escapes her cage and frees him. As Nathan flees, Oralee obtains a gun and fatally shoots the cannibals. In the woods, Nathan stumbles across a dog caught in a bear trap. Nathan frees the animal, taking it as a sign he has freed Maxine from Hell. A "The End" title card appears onscreen.

However, the film abruptly resumes, following Oralee as she runs through the woods, pursued by demons, and experiencing violent hallucinations. She gets back to their camp and hides in the tent, aiming her gun at the entrance. As Nathan approaches, a panicked Oralee prepares to fire, and the film ends.

The documentary resumes shortly after this, with scholars observing a rune seen throughout the film, which belongs to a demon named Astaroth. Examples of the rune appearing subliminally throughout the film are shown as historians recount tragedies attributed to the demon throughout history.

== Cast ==
- Rowan Smyth as Nathan
- Nicole Tompkins as Oralee, Nathan's older sister
- Dan Istrate as Cassius (First Cannibal)
- Circus-Szalewski as Hanzie (Second Cannibal)
- Shu Sakimoto as Haruki (Victim)
- Kristel Elling as Amber, Nathan and Oralee's mother
- Lucy Rayner as narrator (Voice)
- Pierluca Arancio as The Demon Amon
- A.J. Bond as himself
- Nathan Fleet as himself
- Brock Fricker as himself
- Assen Gadjalov as himself
- Maslam

== Production ==
=== Development ===
A number of people have died, or been seriously injured during or shortly after watching this film. As a result of these incidents Antrum disappeared, or was deliberately buried by people who were apprehensive about its continued screening.

— A note from one of the film's producers, recalling Antrum's fictional history.

Antrum was written, produced, and directed by David Amito and Michael Laicini. Development for the film began while Amito and Laicini were working on developing a separate project, which they described as a "horror love story". While working on that film's script, they began brainstorming possible scenarios that they could include in the film, specifically the ones that scared them. As they would later recall in an interview with Rue Morgue, the central idea came from the concept of what it would be like to watch a purported "cursed" film with a history of harming the people who saw it. Feeling that the idea would make an excellent horror film, the filmmakers began developing a screenplay based on the initial concept. In an interview with Rue Morgue, both Amito and Laicini stated that the plot of the "cursed film" was deliberately made as "a dark fairy tale," with themes dealing with loss and moral ramifications of belief. Further inspiration came from a short film horror film titled Dining Room or There is Nothing, which Laicini claimed to have viewed while in film school, which left a lasting impression on him. For Antrum's occult aspects, Amito, and Laicini studied various historical and cultural depictions of demons and the devil for inspiration, with their shared interests in religious imagery and the supernatural also factoring into the development of the film's script. Most of the symbols and runes depicted in the film were taken from a 17th Century text called Lesser Key of Solomon.

=== Casting ===
American actress Nicole Tompkins was cast in the lead role of Oralee. Tompkins had previously starred in the 2016 films Opening Night, and The Amityville Terror. Tompkins was immediately drawn to the role after receiving the film's script during her audition, later recalling: "When I got the material it really clicked for me. I felt like I had something to say and something to bring to the role and apparently, the director’s felt the same because here we are!" Tompkins described her character as being incredibly smart, and creative, with her actions motivated by a strong bond towards her younger brother. American child actor Rowan Smyth, who had previously starred in the Christian drama film I Believe (2017), was cast as Oralee's young brother Nathan.

=== Filming ===
Principal photography for Antrum lasted for a period of one month in Southern California, was shot under a low budget with only a handful of production staff working on the film, with Amito later revealing in an interview with Rue Morgue: "We were wildly understaffed, wildly underfunded and unprepared for this month long shoot… yet, somehow a number of elements just magically landed in our lap." Scenes involving Tompkins' and Smyth characters were filmed in a one-hundred acre, privately owned forest, where the filmmakers had been granted special permission to shoot at. Actress Tompkins spoke very positively of her experience working on the film, calling it both challenging and rewarding, and described her working relationship with filmmakers Amito, and Laicini as being very much "in sync" with one another.

== Release ==
=== Theatrical release ===
Antrum made its world premiere at the Brooklyn Horror Film Festival on 14 October 2018. It was later screened at the Brussels International Fantastic Film Festival on 18 April 2019. On 1 September 2019, it was screened at the Horrible Imaginings Film Festival. It was a part of the official selection of films at the Sitges Film Festival, with the screening taking place on 1 October 2019. On 1 November 2019, it was screened at Mórbido Fest. It was screened at Night Visions International Film Festival, on 20 November 2019.

=== Home media ===
It was later announced that Uncork’d Entertainment had acquired North American distribution rights to Antrum, and planned on releasing it via Video-on-Demand and streaming services in Fall 2019. Antrum was released via Video-on-Demand, and VHS special edition in the United States and Canada on 12 November 2019. Antrum would later become the #1 trending film on Amazon Prime. It was announced that the film would also be released in Japan in early February 2020, and would later have its home media release there on 7 February.

== Reception ==
=== Critical response ===
Critical response for Antrum has been mostly positive, with critics praising the film's unnerving atmosphere, retro 70s style, and blurring the lines between fiction and reality. Anya Stanley from Dread Central rated the film three out of five stars, writing, "Antrum is a multilayered indulgence of the imagination that uses both internal narrative and a mockumentary structure to blur the line between fiction and reality." Dolores Quintana of Nightmarish Conjurings called it "a film both fascinating and deeply odd that crawls under your skin", praising the film's atmosphere, dreamlike style, cinematography, and performances. Kat Hughes from The Hollywood News awarded the film three out of five stars, praising the film's atmosphere, blurring of fiction and reality, growing sense of unease, and recreation of 1970s style cinema, while criticizing the film's character development. Martin Unsworth from Starburst Magazine gave the film a score of eight out of ten stars, praising the film's plot, performances, soundtrack, visuals, and authentic 70s style, calling it "an unsettling experience". Deirdre Crimmins of Rue Morgue offered the film similar praise, writing, "Tense and unnerving, unpredictable and mean spirited, Antrum: The Deadliest Film Ever Made adds layers to the terrifying power of cinema."

The film was not without its detractors. On his website, Kim Newman noted that, while the film was "technically ambitious" and commending some of its visuals, its thin plot, repetitiveness, and unconvincing documentary elements undermined it. Roger Moore of Roger's Movie Nation was highly critical of the film, stating, "Antrum: The Deadliest Film Ever Made isn’t amateurish enough to be charming or professional enough to pull off the con job." Mike Sprague from Joblo rated the film a mixed score of five out of ten, commending the film's intriguing premise, and soundtrack, but also stated that the film did not take full advantage of its premise, and criticized its "amateurish" qualities, and general lack of scares.

== See also ==
- "Cigarette Burns"
- Fury of the Demon
