= Brooklyn Horror Film Festival =

Film festival in Brooklyn, New York

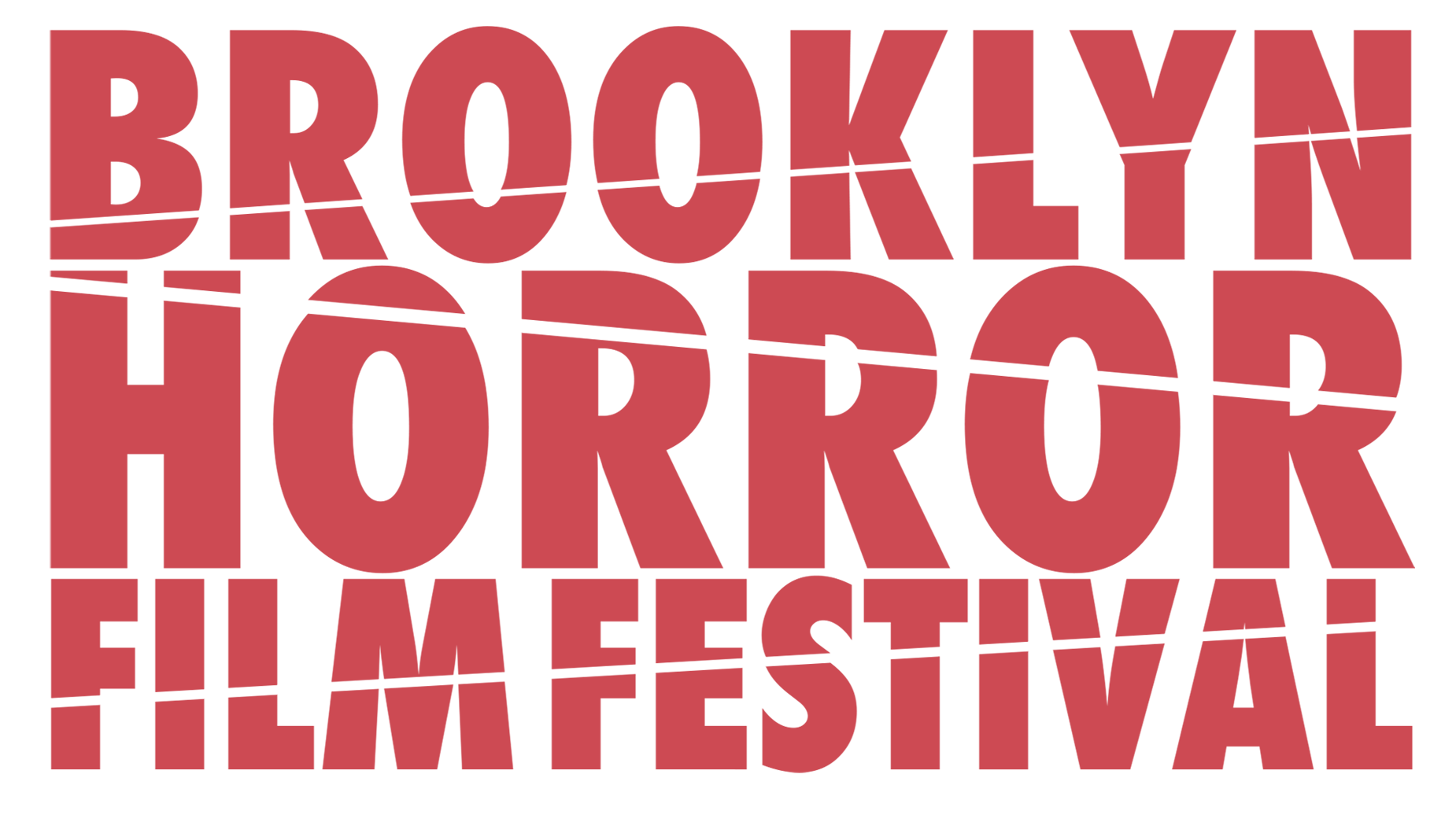
- Status: Active
- Genre: Film festival
- Location: Brooklyn, New York
- Country: United States
- Inaugurated: 2016
- Area: International
- Website: brooklynhorrorfest.com

The Brooklyn Horror Film Festival is an annual film festival in Brooklyn, New York. It was founded in 2016.

With the 2020 edition of the festival cancelled due to the COVID-19 pandemic in the United States, it was one of the partners in the Nightstream online festival.

== Festivals by year ==
=== 2016 ===
The first annual festival took place from October 14–16, 2016. The festival took place in multiple theaters including Wythe Hotel Cinema, Videology, Spectacle Theater and Syndicated Theater.

==== World premieres ====
- Child Eater dir. Erlingur Ottar Thoroddsen - Closing Night film
- Psychotic! A Brooklyn Slasher dir. Maxwell Frey & Derek Gibbons

==== North American premieres ====
- Broken dir. Shaun Robert Smith

==== US premieres ====
- Without Name dir. Lorcan Finnegan
  - Winner of Best Feature, Best Director, Best Editing, Best Cinematography
- Let Her Out dir. Cody Calahan
- Therapy dir. Nathan Ambrosioni
- Fury of the Demon dir. Fabien Delage

==== East Coast premieres ====
- Dearest Sister dir. Mattie Do - Opening Night film
- We Are The Flesh dir. Emiliano Rocha Minter - Centerpiece film
  - Winner of Best Actor - Noé Hernández

==== New York premieres ====
- Beyond The Gates dir. Jackson Stewart
  - Audience Award Winner
- Trash Fire dir. Richard Bates Jr.
  - Winner of Best Actress - Angela Trimbur
- The Master Cleanse dir. Bobby Miller
  - Winner of Best Effects
- Pet dir. Carles Torrens

==== Retrospective screenings ====
- The Sentinel dir. Michael Winner

==== Short Films ====
- Nightmare Fuel: Scary Horror Shorts: Pigskin, The Puppet Man, Tilly, Playback, The Sticks, The Home, The Stylist
- Head Trip: Alternative Horror Shorts: Disco Inferno (dir. Alice Waddington), Eveless, The Push, Empty Bed, Venefica, Shorty
- Local's Only: Shorts by Brooklyn filmmakers: Mute, Chambers, Last Stop Coney Island, Stitched, ETA, The Toothbrush, Wandering

==== Special events ====
- Grady Hendrix's Summerland Lost: A Ghost Story
- Critical Drinking
- Apparition: A Popup Art Show
- Ghosts We've Known: Storytelling Competition
- Tears - Live music performance by Dani Marie and Johnny Butler

=== 2017 ===
==== World premieres ====
- Get My Gun dir. Brian Darwas

==== North American premieres ====
- Clementina dir. Jimena Monteoliva
- The Forest of Lost Souls dir. José Pedro Lopes
- Housewife dir. Can Evrenol - Opening Night film
- Mexico Barbado II dirs. Lex Ortega, Sergio Tello, Diego Cohen, Fernando Urdapilleta, Michel Garza, Carlos Melendez, Ricardo Farías, Christian Cueva, & Abraham Sanchez
- Salvation dir. Denise Castro
- The Book of Birdie dir. Elizabeth E. Schuch - Closing Night film

==== US premieres ====
- I Remember You dir. Oskar Thór Axelsson
- Veronica dirs. Carlos Algara & Alejandro Martinez Beltran

==== East Coast premieres ====
- 1974 dir. Victor Dryere
- Cold Hell dir. Stefan Ruzowitzky - Centerpiece film
- Hagazussa dir. Lukas Feigelfeld
- To Hell and Back: The Kane Hodder Story dir. Derek Dennis Herbert
- Inheritance dir. Tyler Savage
- The Crescent dir. Seth A. Smith

==== New York premieres ====
- Fashionista dir. Simon Rumley
- Game of Death dirs. Laurence Baz Morais & Sebastien Landry
- Mayhem dir. Joe Lynch - Centerpiece film
- Rift dir. Erlingur Thoroddsen
- Sequence Break dir. Graham Skipper
- Tragedy Girls dir. Tyler McIntyre

==== Retrospective Screenings ====
- Friday the 13th dir. Sean S. Cunningham
- Friday the 13th Part 2 dir. Steve Miner
- Friday the 13th Part III: 3D dir. Steve Miner
- Friday the 13th: The Final Chapter dir. Joseph Zito
- Victor Crowley dir. Adam Green

== See also ==
- List of fantastic and horror film festivals
