= Wait for Me (unproduced film) =

Unfinished film by Peter Bogdanovich

- Directed by: Peter Bogdanovich
- Written by: Peter Bogdanovich
- Produced by: Brett Ratner (2014–2017); Frank Marshall (2018–2022)
- Production company: RatPac Entertainment (2014–2017)
- Distributed by: Warner Bros. (2014–2017)
- Country: United States
- Language: English
- Budget: $24 million (Note: The $15 million budget (that had been suggested in 1999) would be equivalent to approximately $24 million in 2016, when adjusted for inflation.)

Wait for Me is an unfinished ensemble comedy drama fantasy film that was written and going to be directed by Peter Bogdanovich. Inspired by his relationship with the late Dorothy Stratten and the writings of Robert Graves, the project was developed over the course of several decades, from 1980 up until his death in 2022. Bogdanovich dubbed it "the best thing I ever wrote." (Note: For context, Bogdanovich had personally either written or co-written around twenty screenplays, not including ones which were made into films.) The plot would have followed washed-up Hollywood director/star Charles Benedict (Note: Bogdanovich likened the character to Orson Welles or Charlie Chaplin.) who is visited by the ghost of his last wife who was killed six years earlier in a plane crash.

== Premise ==
As Bogdanovich explained, the film would be based on an ideogram of the number six:

[It follows a film director] slash writer, somebody like Cassavetes or Woody Allen or Orson Welles, somebody who acts, directs... who's the star, who directs and writes; and this guy—whose name is Charles Benedict—has been married six times, and he has six daughters; and his last wife, the one he was most in love with, was killed in a plane crash six years before the film begins. And in those six years, Charlie Benedict has gone to hell: he beat up a producer at 20th Century-Fox, he took an axe and chopped up a projection room at Universal [...] anyway, so Charlie Benedict is persona non grata in Hollywood. And, when the picture begins, he has spent the last few months traveling through Sicily and Italy, financed by the Italians, pretending to be looking for locations for a script, but he has no script. And that's how it starts. It's a very complicated picture. The whole thing plays in about five or six days and yet we go to... we start in Rome, then we go to Rio, we go to Vienna, then he goes to Budapest, then he goes back to Vienna, and then he goes to Salzburg, and then he goes to Prague. That's the basic setup, but the thing I haven't told you is that the ghost of his last wife appears to him, and they have a relationship—ghost and him—I don't wanna go into the whole thing, but there are six ghosts in the picture. And they're all friendly. And there's a sub[plot]... there's another plot that involves one of the six daughters who's going with a rock star, and she disappears. The rock star blames everything on Charles, 'cause he was such a bad father. It's a complicated picture. It's comedy, drama, fantasy.

== Cast ==
Script notes from 1997 indicated Bogdanovich's ideal cast at the time:

- Michael Caine as Charles Benedict, a famous comedy star/writer/director (Note: The part was originally going to be played by John Cassavetes before his death in 1989.)

His six wives (and six daughters)

- Gena Rowlands as Sally Reynolds, a film producer
  - (daughters: Mimi and Sandy Benedict)
- Anjelica Huston as Faye Hillyard, a film star
  - (daughter: Beatrice Benedict)
- Catherine Deneuve as Catharine LaSalle, a French film star
  - (daughter: Sophie Benedict)
- Liza Minnelli as Lisa Cardo, a singer-film star
  - (daughter: Beth Benedict)
- Isabella Rossellini as Belle Preston, a TV talk-show host
  - (daughter: Zoe Benedict)
- Cybill Shepherd as Cynthia Morrison, a deceased film star

His friends

- a "Young Rock Star" (TBD) as Johnny Rogers, a popular rock singer/composer
- George Segal as Edward Mitchell, an executive producer
- Harry Carey, Jr. as Red Wilson, a line producer
- Alain Delon as Jean-Pierre Fallon, a French film star
- a "Young Film Star" (TBD) as Max Armbruster, a young film star

And the deceased

- Ben Gazzara as Robert "Bobby" Ricci, a California Senator
- Peter Falk as Philip Hawkins, an industrialist billionaire
- a "Black Comedy Star" (TBD) as Rick Beauchamps, a film and television comedian
- Christopher Reeve as Steve Creevers, a movie star
- Jerry Lewis as Joey Lewing, a film and television comedian

Quentin Tarantino additionally agreed to act in the film. Though his exact role was never specified, Tarantino was to supposedly play one of the six ghost characters.

== Production ==
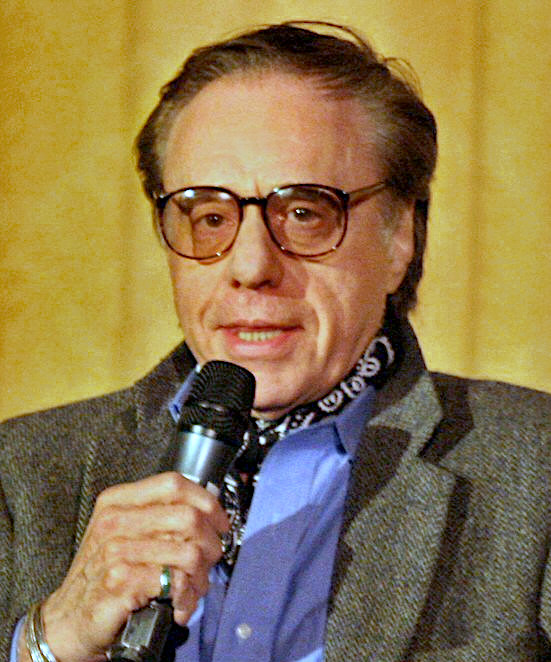
Bogdanovich, pictured in 2008

=== Development and casting ===
Peter Bogdanovich first began thinking about the idea for Wait for Me after the tragic murder of Dorothy Stratten, in around November of 1980, but he did not complete a first draft of a script until the end of that decade. "I like the story. It's got a lot more difficult since I first thought of it, though. It used to be about a guy who married three times and had three daughters. Now he marries six times and has six daughters," he later said of the various permutations the film went through over the years. It was originally envisioned as a vehicle for Stratten, telling a romantic story about an orchestra conductor who falls for a Dutch violinist. That early concept, called The Return of the Count, was planned as a deeply personal comedy with roots in his own life, similarly to what he had done with They All Laughed (1981).

Eventually, the idea evolved into what Bogdanovich called a "ghost comedy", that was influenced by his childhood love of René Clair's The Ghost Goes West (1935). The character of Charles Benedict—modeled on figures like John Cassavetes and Bogdanovich himself—was initially intended to be played by Cassavetes before his death in 1989. "For the rest of the time before he died, he'd say, 'Are you going to make that picture?' I said, 'Yeah.' He said, 'You better make that picture.' And then when he was very close to dying, one of the last things he said to me was, 'Listen, kid, you better make that picture, because you know what? I'll be there'." Over time, Bogdanovich worked on the script intermittently, reimagining it as a far more ambitious ensemble piece that would only work with "recognizable" star actors playing the characters.

The closest iteration to the film being made was in the late 1990s, which had Michael Caine, Gena Rowlands, Anjelica Huston, Catherine Deneuve, Liza Minnelli, Isabella Rossellini, Cybill Shepard, George Segal, Harry Carey Jr., Alain Delon, Ben Gazzara, Peter Falk, Christopher Reeve, and Quentin Tarantino in the cast; with Jerry Lewis in a cameo role. Bogdanovich was able to raise $15 million in financing, but put it on hold because he didn't feel the script was "quite right", and vowed return to it once it had been rewritten sufficiently. In 2004, he told author Peter Tonguette that he wanted the ghosts in the film to function visually in a way unseen before: "They sort of disappear and then appear, dematerialize and then materialize. But they're always transparent," he said, imagining scenes where spirits would drop in with only a line before vanishing again. In accordance with this, the project was to be the first of his to utilize computer-generated effects.

Finally satisfied with a new draft, Bogdanovich came close to making Wait for Me in the mid-2010s with the producing assistance of Brett Ratner and his company RatPac Entertainment. In 2016, he allegedly had a famous actor considering the main part, but did not disclose who. "If we have him, then everybody else will fall into place," he said at the 18th Buenos Aires Independent Film Festival. By 2018, Wait for Me remained a future project of Bogdanovich's, with him revealing in an interview that Frank Marshall would now be producing it, and that they were still discussing potential actors. (Note: At this time, Ratner was likely no longer involved, after Warner Bros. severed ties with his various projects in development due to his multiple sexual assault and abuse allegations that were made public.) Wes Anderson and Noah Baumbach were also said to have offered to help co-produce the film. Though it was never officially confirmed, it could be presumed that the "famous actor" Bogdanovich spoke of was none other than Breaking Bad star Bryan Cranston, whom he had been in continuous contact with over the COVID-19 pandemic about a cryptically-described "part in a future picture". Regardless, Bogdanovich was still hoping to make the film at the time of his death in 2022.

=== Filming ===
Wait for Me was planned to be shot in various cities in different countries. The order in which they appear in the film are Rome, Rio, Vienna, Budapest, Vienna again, Salzburg, and Prague. Bogdanovich was in pre-production on the film as of 2016, and he expected that principal photography would commence in spring 2017.

== Legacy ==
Film scholar James Kenney, who rescued the original version of She's Funny That Way (2014), deemed Wait for Me as "a most Bogdanovichian masterwork that should have been greenlit" and declared the script "should still be published", despite the director's death.
