= Fury of the Demon =

- US film poster
- French: La rage du Démon
- Directed by: Fabien Delage
- Written by: Fabien Delage
- Produced by: Christophe Battarel; Jordane Oudin
- Starring: Alexandre Aja; Dave Alexander; Jean-Jacques Bernard; Christophe Gans; Pauline Méliès
- Cinematography: Emilie Aujé; Raul Fernandez
- Edited by: David Tillault
- Production company: Hippocampe Productions
- Distributed by: Saint-André-des-Arts (France)
- Release dates: January 30, 2016 (Festival de Gérardmer); October 15, 2016
- Running time: 60 minutes
- Countries: France; Croatia; USA
- Languages: French, English

Fury of the Demon (French: La rage du Démon) is a 2016 French/Croatian/United States mockumentary film that was written and directed by Fabien Delage. The movie tells the history of film pioneer and director Georges Méliès by way of a documentary focusing on a fictional lost short film that is reputed to have the capability of driving its viewers insane.

The film had its world premiere in 2016 and its United States premiere on October 15, 2016 at the Brooklyn Horror Film Festival.

== Synopsis ==
The documentary focuses on a fictional short film, La rage du Démon, that is purported to have driven its viewers into a temporary but extremely chaotic and rage-filled frenzy. Because of the violence and destruction caused, the movie has only been shown a handful of times and is believed to have been lost. The only known evidence of the film's existence are newspaper reports of murder, arson, and overall destruction that have occurred at theaters where the film was stated to have been shown.

The director of the short film is ultimately unknown but is believed to have been Georges Méliès, a landmark film pioneer and director. Throughout the documentary film directors. critics, and film historians, as well as his granddaughter Pauline, comment on the legitimacy of the claim by discussing the history and achievements of Méliès and his life's work.

== Cast ==
- Alexandre Aja
- Dave Alexander
- Jean-Jacques Bernard
- Christophe Gans
- Pauline Méliès

== Reception ==
Fury of the Demon was reviewed by outlets such as Screen Anarchy and Bloody Disgusting, the latter of which stated that while some of the content was repetitious, the documentary's interviewees were a "great mix of deadly sincere, enthusiastic, and scholarly" and that it was "a breezy, entertaining watch that cinephiles and horror hounds will particularly dig." Tom Holland's Terror Time and SciFiNow also praised the choice of interviewees for the film, as well as Delage's attention to historical information. Dread Central wrote a favorable review for the film, rating it at 3.5 out of 5 stars and stating that "Not only does Fury of the Demon work as a great made-for-TV documentary with lots of intrigue, it highlights the inherent horror elements of Méliés work and invites the viewer to track down his films and fall down the rabbit hole."

== See also ==
- "Cigarette Burns"
- Antrum
- Flicker
