= Screener (promotional) =

Promotional copy of a film

A screener (SCR) is an advance or promotional copy of a film or television series sent to critics, awards voters, video stores (for their manager and employees), and other film industry professionals, including producers and distributors. It is similar to giving out a free advance copy of books before it is printed for mass distribution. Director John Boorman is credited with creating the first Oscar screeners to promote his film The Emerald Forest in 1985.

== Overview ==
Screeners help critics and awards voters see smaller movies that do not have the marketing advantage or distribution of major studio releases. Positive mentions can result in awards consideration. A screener often has no post-processing. According to critic Alan Sepinwall, DVD screeners occasionally give picture problems. Nowadays, physical DVD copies still appear to be issued, but screeners are also distributed digitally to members of the Academy of Motion Picture Arts and Sciences, and the media/publicity sites of individual television networks for television shows.

== Protections ==
When screeners leak online, they are often tagged "DVDSCR", and often have an on-screen graphic watermark and could come with embedded tracking technology. Another anti-piracy measure includes the encryption of DVD discs so that they will only play in machines given exclusively to voters. Studios also used self-destructing discs made by Flexplay Technologies. After the DVDs are removed from their air-tight packaging they immediately begin to oxidize and become unreadable 48 hours later. In 2003, César Award voters received a Flexplay DVD screener of Gus Van Sant's Palme d'Or winner Elephant, making it the first use of the limited-play technology for award screeners. The discs were also encrypted with Content Scramble System (CSS) to prevent copying. Peter Bart, Oscar voter for many years, finds the threats and admonitions regarding screeners tiresome. Many TV sets do not recognize the "enter" instruction on the videos to certify your "acceptance" of the threats, making the movie unwatchable.

== History ==
According to the Los Angeles Times, Oscar screeners originated with the efforts of director John Boorman to promote his film The Emerald Forest, a 1985 Powers Boothe vehicle about an American child kidnapped by a tribe in the Amazon rainforest. The film had been lauded by critics, but due to the business troubles of its distributor, Embassy Pictures, received no advertising campaign. Boorman paid for VHS copies of the film to be made available to Academy members for no charge at certain Los Angeles video rental stores. While this did not result in any Oscar nominations for the film, other studios responded to the novelty of the campaign, and the practice of providing complimentary video copies to awards voters became ubiquitous by the 1990s.

In 2003, the MPAA, representing the major film studios, announced that they would not distribute screeners to Academy members, citing fears of copyright infringement; independent studios unaffiliated with the major distributors were not affected by the ban. A group of independent film makers sued and won a decision against the MPAA. The MPAA later reinstated the screeners with the implementation of a new policy requiring recipients to sign a binding contract that they would not share the screeners with others. That year, screeners were only distributed in videocassette format, with procedures in place to protect them.

In January 2004, academy member Carmine Caridi was announced as a person of interest in an ongoing FBI investigation into video piracy. He was subsequently expelled from the academy, after he was found to have sent as many as 60 screeners a year for at least three years to a contact called Russell Sprague in Illinois. Caridi was later ordered to pay Warner Bros. for copyright infringement of two of their films, Mystic River and The Last Samurai, a total of $300,000 ($150,000 per title).

In early 2006, Lions Gate Films sent a DVD of Crash to every member of the Screen Actors Guild during voting for the 12th Screen Actors Guild Awards; the film ultimately won its prize for Outstanding Performance by a Cast in a Motion Picture, and subsequently went on to win the Academy Award for Best Picture. This was the first time screeners had been sent to SAG's entire membership, as its large size (over 130,000 at the time) had presented cost and security concerns. Variety reported that Lions Gate was not concerned about screener piracy, because the film had already been released on home video. It was later said that the success of this gambit had largely outweighed any remaining reservations about large-scale screener distribution among film studios.

In 2014, a copy of The Secret Life of Walter Mitty appeared on file sharing networks, bearing the watermark "Ellen DeGeneres 11/26/13". 20th Century Fox sent the copy to her show around the time she interviewed actor and director Ben Stiller. It was not an Oscar screener, since the studio forensically watermarks those copies differently. It is unusual for a pirate copy to identify a specific individual. Andy Baio, former CTO of Kickstarter, reported the appearance of the pirated copy on his blog Waxy. Baio started tracking the illicit distribution of Oscar screeners in 2004 and publishes his findings on his blog, which turned into an annual ritual whereby he updates his spreadsheet.

In March 2016, TorrentFreak reported that original screener DVDs appear in dozens of eBay listings. According to eBay seller NoHo Trader, the sale of Emmy screener DVDs is lawful, although studios occasionally still take down Emmy DVD auctions and other lawful promotional materials. The Television Academy indicates the limited license governing the use of these screeners prohibits further distribution.

In 2019, the Academy introduced a private video on demand platform known as the "Academy Screening Room", accessible online and via an Apple TV app, which allows distributors to host screeners online for a fee. In April 2020, citing sustainability concerns, the Academy announced that physical screeners and other items mailed to voters would be discontinued entirely by the 94th Academy Awards in 2022, after which screeners would solely be available on the Screening Room app. The ban on DVD and Blu-Ray screeners marked the end of a long-standing tradition. The term WEBSCR (web screener) will be seen more from now on in pirated release titles. However, by 2022, Andy Baio noted that only 9% of that year's Oscar-nominated films had screeners leaked online, a steep decline from highs of 89% in 2003 and 2004.

In 2020, the Emmys made the switch from sending out DVD screeners to online streaming, motivated to eliminate waste and to save tens of millions of dollars for the television industry. But several major outlets expressed their frustration to the new fees for their online Emmy screeners. They're not saving money like they thought they would. According to some industry insiders, it is also easier to prevent online screeners from leaking into the hands of pirates. The piracy group EVO writes this is not necessarily the case and the opposite may be true in some cases. Anthony Anderson, director of film security for Universal Pictures, points out that just as many problems exist with digital screeners that could make them less secure: login credentials can be shared, each device presents unique security challenges and an online offering can be attacked from anywhere.

== See also ==
- Test screening
- Film screening
- Camming
- Canary trap
- Coded anti-piracy
- UMG Recordings, Inc. v. Augusto
