= The Forest of the Lost Souls =

- Theatrical release poster
- Directed by: José Pedro Lopes
- Written by: José Pedro Lopes
- Produced by: Ana Almeida
- Starring: Daniela Love; Jorge Mota; Mafalda Banquart; Ligia Roque; Lília Lopes
- Cinematography: Francisco Lobo
- Edited by: Ana Almeida
- Music by: Emanuel Grácio
- Production companies: Anexo 82; Studio 2203; Creatura; Agente a Norte
- Distributed by: Anexo 82; Wild Eye Releasing
- Release dates: February 26, 2017 (Fantasporto); February 26, 2017 (Portugal)
- Running time: 71 minutes
- Country: Portugal
- Language: Portuguese

The Forest of the Lost Souls (Portuguese: A Floresta das Almas Perdidas) is a 2017 Portuguese slasher drama film directed by José Pedro Lopes. Described as a "coming of age slasher movie", the film had its world premiere at the Director's Week of the Fantasporto Film Festival 2017.

The titular forest is a fictional place between Portugal and Spain, an infamous suicide spot. One morning two complete strangers with their own demons to bear meet within the woods.

== Plot ==
The film opens with a young woman named Irene committing suicide in the "Forest of Lost Souls", a place where many people go to commit suicide. The film then cuts to her father Ricardo, who has grown despondent over Irene's death and has decided to take his life in the same forest. While venturing into the forest he encounters Caroline and the two decide to walk through the forest, during which time they talk about their lives and reasons for suicide. They eventually make their way to the location where Irene died and Ricardo decides to die by drinking poison provided by Caroline rather than use the knife he brought with him. As he dies Ricardo mentions Irene, causing Caroline to mock him before using the knife to stab him to death.

While leaving the forest Caroline discovers Ricardo's car, which contains his cell phone and a photo of his daughters Irene and Filipa. She then uses the phone to trick Filipa and her mother Joana into coming to Ricardo's home so she can kill them both. Caroline successfully murders Joana and stages her body for Filipa to find. She stabs Filipa in the back but before she can finish the woman off, Filipa's boyfriend Tiago comes to the door. Caroline manages to send Tiago away, but the distraction gives Filipa time to recover enough to launch an attack. This ultimately fails and Caroline shoots Filipa to death before leaving in Ricardo's car, which she uses to run over Tiago. She then returns to the forest to dispose of the knife near Ricardo's body before leaving to attend a music festival with her friends. The film ends with Carolina returning to her daily life and the news reporting that Ricardo took his own life after murdering his entire family and Tiago.

== Cast ==
- Daniela Love as Carolina
- Jorge Mota as Ricardo
- Mafalda Banquart as Filipa
- Ligia Roque as Joana
- Lília Lopes as Irene
- Tiago Jácome as Tiago

== Reception ==
On review aggregator Rotten Tomatoes, The Forest of the Lost Souls holds an approval rating of 75%, based on 16 reviews, and an average rating of 7/10. On Metacritic, the film has a weighted average score of 63 out of 100, based on 4 critics, indicating "Generally favorable reviews".

Screen Anarchy described the film as "Arthouse meets the Grindhouse". Variety wrote "...the black-and-white stalker drama “The Forest of Lost Souls” is a nasty and impressive little thriller that goes about its business with ruthless cinematic efficiency."

The Los Angeles Times wrote "“The Forest of the Lost Souls” is a bit of a puzzle, which some viewers might find too much trouble to solve — especially given that in the middle it becomes shockingly violent. But the black-and-white images are lovely to look at, and whatever’s true or untrue about the characters, they’re all clearly alienated."
