= Game of Death (2017 film) =

2017 horror film

- Film poster
- Directed by: Sebastien Landry; Laurence Morais-Lagacé
- Written by: Sebastien Landry; Laurence Morais-Lagacé; Edouard H. Bond; Philip Kalin-Hajdu
- Starring: Sam Earle; Victoria Diamond; Emelia Hellman
- Production company: Rockzeline
- Distributed by: Blackpills
- Release date: 2017
- Running time: 73 minutes
- Countries: France; Canada; United States
- Language: English

Game of Death is a 2017 splatter film directed by Sebastien Landry and Laurence Morais-Lagacé. Its plot features seven millennials who play an evil board game that demands people be killed.

== Cast ==
- Sam Earle as Tom
- Victoria Diamond as Beth
- Emelia Hellman as Ashley
- Catherine Saindon as Mary-Ann
- Erniel Baez as Tyler
- Nick Serino as Kenny
- Thomas Vallieres as Matthew
- Jane Hackett as Marilyn
- Steve Godin as Neighbor
- Neve Leblanc as Samantha
- Natalie Darbyson as Nurse Olivia

== Release ==
Game of Death premiered at the South by Southwest film festival.

=== Critical reception ===
On the review aggregator website Rotten Tomatoes, 58% of 31 critics' reviews are positive. The website's consensus reads: "Game of Death's over-the-top violence and gore will be too much for some, but genre fans up for some bloody thrills will find it well worth playing."

Dennis Harvey of Variety called the film "vigorously tasteless", yet praised "a certain witty meta quality to the goings-on." Anthony Ray Bench of Film Threat gave the film a score of 8/10, calling it "a bloody good time." Writing for RogerEbert.com, Simon Abrams gave the film a negative review, commenting that "the storytelling isn't especially strong, and its high-concept hook is stale", also commenting that the characters are "unmemorable".
