= Cam (bootleg) =

Bootleg recording of a film

A cam (camrip or camming, deriving from camcorder) is a bootleg recording of a film recorded in a movie theater. Generally unlike the more common DVD rip or screener recording methods which involve the duplication of officially distributed media, cam versions are original clandestine recordings made in movie theaters.

== Audience camming ==
The most common type of cam is produced by a movie theater patron who smuggles a compact digital camcorder into a movie theater by hiding it in their clothing or in a container such as a handbag or backpack. The filmer then records the movie using the camcorder as unobtrusively as possible. They may try to pick a seat as far back in the auditorium as possible to avoid the attention of other patrons (and to ensure proper framing of the screen) and/or choose sparsely attended showtimes. The filmer may also rely on cinema employees who will overlook infringement activity because of an existing friend or family relationship, collusion, bribery, or apathy to the law.

Around the start of the millennium, many first time camera recordings originated from Malaysia, recognizable by the burn-in Malay subtitles. VCDs often appeared 2 to 3 days before the theatrical release. In some cases, they were even available online 3 months before release. Robert Krulwich sees two possibilities as the main reason for such early availability of these illicit recordings. Some in Hollywood screen movies a couple of days before they are screened in the rest of the United States, or some people get prints sent to them from people in the Californian movie business.

In an attempt to impede this practice (as well as curb the smuggling in of non-theater food), some establishments began to ban customers from carrying bags or other containers into theaters. As an additional form of deterrent, theaters may equip ushers with night vision goggles to discreetly catch a bootlegger in the act of recording. With the improvement in camera quality and storage space of smartphones, it is now somewhat more difficult to detect when a person is recording in a movie theater.

Cams produced in this way use the camera's microphone to record audio, which tends to produce a recording that sounds "muddy". In addition, the microphone may pick up ambient noises in the auditorium, such as the audience's response to the film (e.g. laughter, screaming) or disruptive noises (crying baby, mobile phone ring, people coughing, etc.). A camera situated in the audience area may record silhouettes of other audience members, especially those leaving the theater for the restroom or concession stand. In the auditoria of older or poorly maintained theaters, other sounds such as air conditioning or sound from adjacent auditoria may also be audible. Quality may also suffer from frame rate conversion issues if there is a mismatch between the frame rate of the camera and the projection (usually 24 fps). In other cases, a tripod is used in the handicapped sections of an auditorium while plugging the jack in a hard-of-hearing device. These recordings with better sound are called telesync.

== Projectionist camming ==
Sometimes cam versions are made by projectionists themselves, either for home use or to distribute (with or without profit). This provides several advantages: first, the projection booth window has a central, unobstructed view of the screen. second, the projectionist can bypass the built-in microphone and link the camcorder directly to the monitor output of the audio rack, resulting in a clear, well-separated stereo recording. This is known as telesync. The projectionist can also alleviate the frame rate conversion problem described above by speeding the projector up from film's traditional 24 fps to 25 fps and then use a standard PAL video camera to record the film picture. These advantages come with a higher risk: a projectionist, if caught, will almost certainly be fired, and is more likely than the typical audience member to face legal prosecution.

== Anti-piracy ==
Since 2001, many major motion pictures have been shipped to theaters with watermarks of unique patterns of tiny dots embedded throughout the film, known as Coded Anti-Piracy technology. If the cammer is unable to catch and blur all of these sequences, the studio can determine at which theater the cam was recorded.

== Compared to other piracy methods ==
The overall quality of cam bootlegs is highly dependent upon the choice of theater (and sometimes the individual screening), the quality of camera used, the skill of the operator in framing the screen and minimizing camera movement, and the method of encoding used before distribution. Cams are generally considered to be the lowest fidelity method for duplicating video and film content, somewhat behind telesync and markedly worse than DVD rips or screeners. For newly released films, however, cams are often the first bootleg copies available. In the developing world, cam DVDs are often available from street vendors for prices equivalent to US$1–2 (PPP); worldwide, they are swapped or sold on Internet pirate sites.

== See also ==
- Analog hole
- Coded anti-piracy, an anti-copyright infringement technology for marking a movie with a pattern of dots to identify the source of illegal copies
- Jon Routson, artist known for the use of camrips in his work
- List of warez groups
- The Scene, an underground internet community that used to be very active in the creation and spreading of bootleg movie recordings
- "The Little Kicks", a 1996 episode of the television series Seinfeld in which cam bootlegging is a major storyline
- Warez
