= PDTV =

Digitally-captured bootleg TV recording

PDTV is an abbreviation short for Pure Digital Television. Often seen as part of the filename of TV shows shared through P2P, The Scene, and FTP servers on the Internet. In this case, PDTV refers not to container, bitrate or dimensions of the video, but the digital nature of the capture source. Non Scene European rippers often use the label DVBRip or DVB-rip to specify a purely digital rip of a Digital Video Broadcast (DVB), however all Scene groups use standardized labeling.

PDTV encompasses a broad array of capture methods and sources, but generally it involves the capture of SD or non-HD digital television broadcasts without any analog-to-digital conversion, instead relying on directly ripping MPEG streams. PDTV sources can be captured by a variety of digital TV tuner cards from a digital feed such as ClearQAM unencrypted cable, Digital Terrestrial Television, Digital Video Broadcast or other satellite sources. Just as with Freeview (DVB-T) in the United Kingdom, broadcast television in the United States has no barriers to PDTV capture. Hardware such as the HDHomeRun when connected to an ATSC (Antenna) or unencrypted ClearQAM cable feed allows lossless digital capture of MPEG-2 streams (Pure Digital Television), without monthly fees or other restrictions normally implemented by a Set-top box. Although different from the analog hole, Pure Digital Television capture imposes no technological restriction on what is done with the stream; playback, Mash-Ups and even recompression/pirated distribution are possible without the permission of the rights holder.

A publisher of fan-made DVD releases also uses the name PDTV, but with no connection to the more common usage explained above. The "PD" in this case refers to "planet dust" with an additional connotation of Public Domain, even though the material offered is more often the video equivalent of abandonware as opposed to anything where copyright has actually expired. Whereas PDTV content online (as described above) is indiscriminate in terms of copyright, physical DVD releases from PDTV only exist to supply fans with material not officially published to the DVD format.

As of 2018, the latter PDTV has undergone somewhat of a "rebranding", shifting its focus slightly to further emphasize preservation of VHS, Beta and Laserdisc content. The meaning of the "PD" part of its name thus becoming more associated with "physical disc" rather than anything else.
