= Coded anti-piracy =

Anti-copyright infringement technology

Coded anti-piracy (CAP) is an anti-copyright infringement technology that marks each film print of a motion picture with a distinguishing pattern of dots, used as a forensic identifier to identify the source of illegal copies.

They are not to be confused with cue marks, which are black or white circles usually in the upper right-hand corner of the frame. A cue mark is used to signal the projectionist that a particular reel of a film is ending, as most films come to theaters on several reels of celluloid.

== CAP code ==
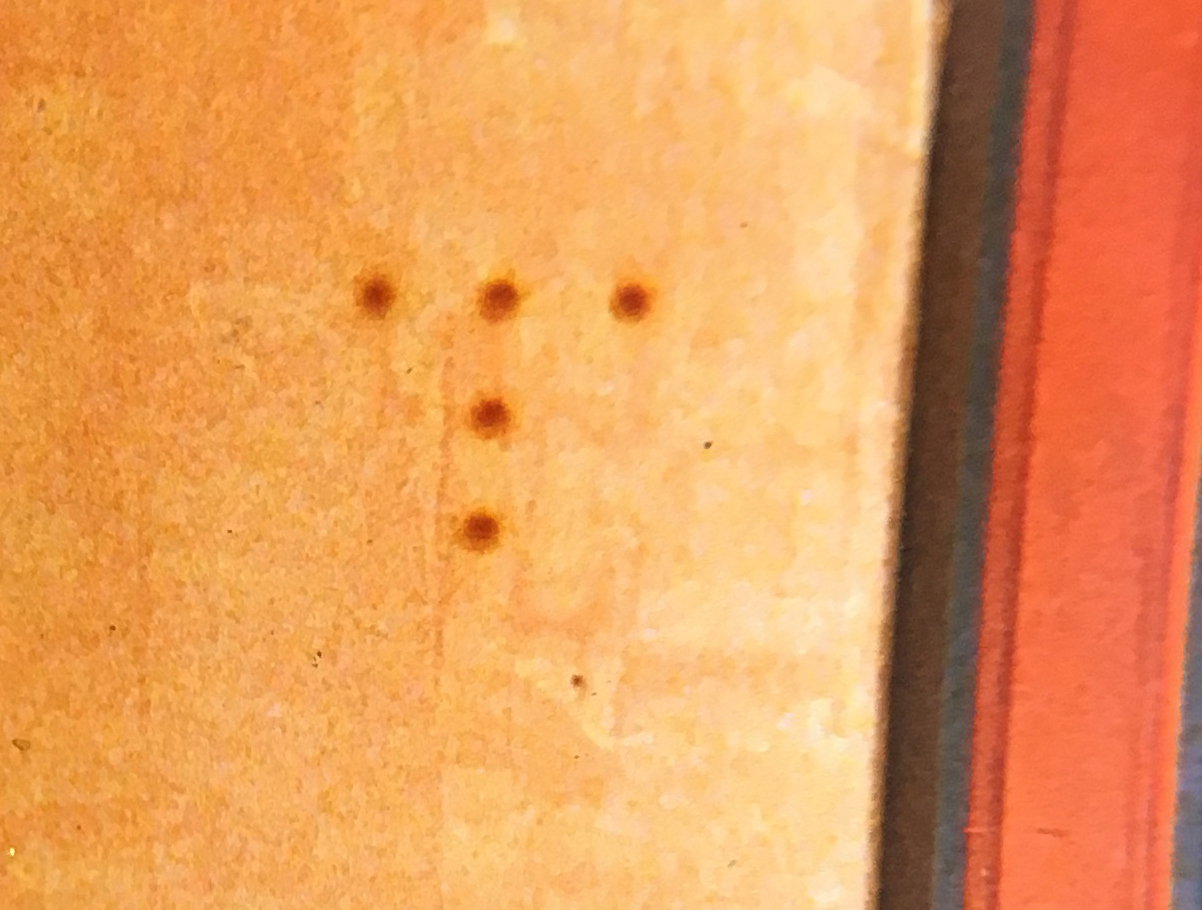
CAP code on a 35 mm print of My Own Private Idaho (Gus Van Sant, 1991)

CAP coding is a multi-dot pattern that is printed in several frames of a film print of a theatrically exhibited motion picture. It is sometimes accompanied by text code printed on the edge of a motion picture print, outside the visible picture area.

The dots are arranged in a unique pattern as identification of the particular print of a movie, and are added during manufacture. The marks are not present on the original film negative; they are produced either by physical imprint on the final film print or by digitally postprocessing a digitally distributed film. This enables codes to be customized on a per-copy basis so that they can be used to trace the print to the theaters that played that particular print and to trace any bootleg copies however they were made – be they telecined, cammed, or telesynced.

=== Kodak's CAP ===
The original style of CAP code, developed in 1982 by Kodak along with the Motion Picture Association, is a series of very small dots printed in the picture area of a film print.

The original instance of CAP developed by Kodak is a technology for watermarking film prints to trace copies of a print, whether legal or not.

=== Deluxe's CAP ===
A newer and more common variation has been developed by Deluxe Media. It makes use of more visible dots, and was developed to thwart film copying from theatergoers with camcorders, or prints that have been illicitly telecined to videotape or DVD.

Due to its quite intrusive nature when viewing, Deluxe's version has been given the pejorative name of "crap code" by filmgoers, having been coined on a movie projectionists' discussion forum. These dots are usually placed on bright areas of a film frame, so they can be more easily identified, and are a reddish-brown color.

=== CineFence ===
A different marking system is CineFence, introduced by Philips in 2006 and commercially available in 2008.

The Digital Cinema System Specification by Digital Cinema Initiatives mandates forensic marking of digital film; CineFence is the first marking system that complies with this standard.

CineFence claims to be imperceptible to the viewer, but robust to copying and encoding, and encodes 35 bits/5 minutes.

== See also ==
- Canary trap
- Cam (bootleg)
- Copy protection
- Cue mark
- EURion constellation
- Printer tracking dots
- Digital Cinema Package § Watermarking
