= Telesync =

Bootleg copy of a film recorded in a theater

A telesync (TS) is a bootleg recording of a film recorded in a movie theater, often (although not always) filmed using a professional camera on a tripod in the projection booth. The audio of a TS is captured with a direct connection to the sound source (often an FM microbroadcast provided for the hearing-impaired, or from a drive-in theater). If a direct connection from the sound source is not possible, sometimes the bootlegger will tape or conceal wireless microphones close to the speakers, as it is better than a mic on the camera. A TS can be considered a higher-quality type of cam, that has the potential of better-quality audio and video.

The true definition of telesync would include the film being synchronized to the camera's own frame rate and shutter timing as done by television companies when preparing celluloid film for broadcast. A bootleg TS rarely, if ever, uses this form of synchronization which can lead to additional temporal aliasing. Most cameras used to make modern telesyncs run at 24 frames per second, like the movie projectors, to reduce artifacts compared to the 60 frames per second cameras of old.

As technology gets better, the quality of telesyncs also improves, although even the best telesyncs are lossy and will be inferior in quality to direct rips from Blu-ray, DVD or digital transfers from the film itself (see telecine). Some release groups use high-definition video cameras to get the clearest picture possible. When an unlicensed copy of a film exists even before its official publication, it is often because a telesync version could be easily produced.

In the German warez scene additional tags for the audio source can be added to a telesync release. These are LD (line dubbed) for when the audio track of an unlicensed copy has been ripped from the line out connection of a projector or MD (mic dubbed) when a microphone is used for the recording. These tags are not used exclusively on cam releases though.

== See also ==
- Coded anti-piracy
- Copyright infringement
- Pirated movie release types
