= Cue mark =

Visual indicator on motion picture films

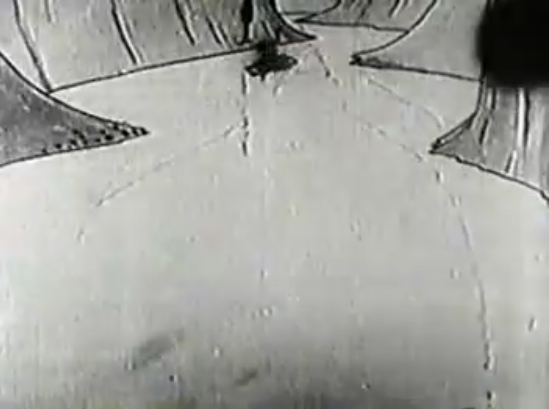
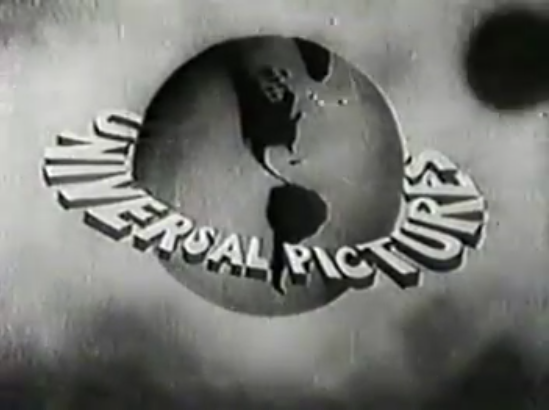
An example of a cue mark on film, from the 1931 reissue of the cartoon Trolley Troubles (1927).

The first cue mark, which is displayed on the first image, means that there are about 8 seconds until the end of the reel.

The second cue mark, displayed on the second image, means that there is about 1 second until the end of the reel.

A cue mark, also known as a cue dot, a cue blip, a changeover cue (Note: The term "changeover cue" can refer to any cue mark, or it can also refer to the second cue in a pair (the one that actually signals the changeover).) or simply a cue, is a visual indicator used with motion picture film prints, usually placed in the upper right corner of a film frame. This can range from small circles to text, scribbles and other drawn indicators. The 1999 movie Fight Club popularised the term cigarette burn, also used in the eponymous episode of the 2005 TV series Masters of Horror. Cue dots are also used as a visual form of signalling on television broadcasts.

A pair of cue marks is used to signal the projectionist that a particular reel of a movie is ending, as most movies presented on film come to theaters on several reels of film lasting about 14 to 20 minutes each (the positive print rolls themselves are either 1,000 feet or, more commonly, 2,000 feet, nominally 11.11 or 22.22 minutes, absolute maximum, with more commonly an editorial maximum of 9 to 10 or 18 to 20 minutes). The marks appear in the last seconds of each reel; the first mark, known as the motor cue, is placed about 8 seconds before the end of the picture section of the reel. The second mark, known as the changeover cue, is placed about 1 second before the end. Each mark lasts for precisely 4 frames (0.17 seconds).

Coded anti-piracy is a different kind of mark, used for watermarking to detect and prevent copyright infringement.

== Placement ==
The exact placement of cues varies somewhat from lab to lab.

According to SMPTE-301 (Theatre Projection Leader), there shall be 4 frames of motor cue, followed by 172 frames of picture, followed by 4 frames of changeover cue, followed by 18 frames of picture. That puts the motor cue at frames 198–195 from the end of the picture section of the reel (12.34 to 12.15 feet; or 12-foot-6-frames through 12-foot-3-frames), and the changeover cue at frames 21–19 from the end (1.31 to 1.18 feet; or 1-foot-5-frames through 1-foot-3-frames). As of January 2005, most domestic United States release prints follow this standard.

According to SMPTE-55 (SMPTE Universal leader), there shall be 4 frames of motor cue, followed by 168 frames of picture, followed by 4 frames of changeover cue, followed by 24 frames of picture. That puts the motor cue at frames 200–197 (12.47 to 12.28 feet; or 12-foot-8-frames to 12-foot-5-frames) from the end of the picture section of the reel, and the changeover cue at frames 28–25 (1.75 to 1.56 feet; or 1-foot-12-frames to 1-foot-9-frames) from the end. Prior to January 2005, domestic United States release prints printed by Deluxe Laboratories (about half of domestic first-run major releases) followed this standard.

=== Appearance ===
Most cue marks appear as either a black circle (if the physical hole is punched out on the negative used to make the projection print of the film), or a white circle (if the mark is made by punching a hole or scraping the emulsion on the positive film print). They will also appear as an oval if the print is projected through an anamorphic lens.

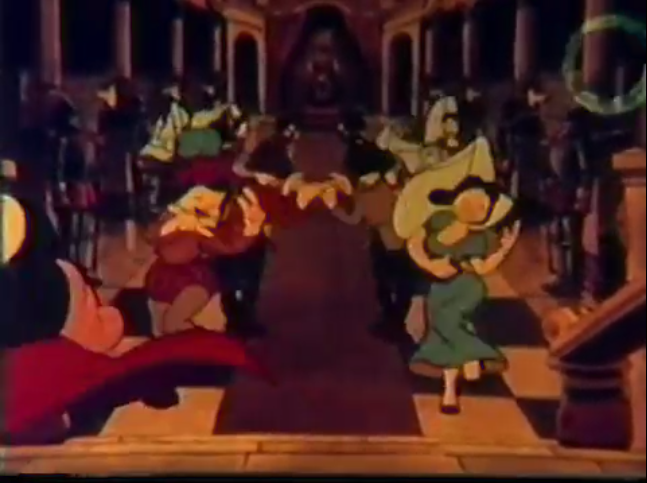
A frame with a cue mark in Jitterbug Knights cartoon, c. 1939

In order to make these marks appear clearer to the projectionist, the punched film is most often "inked" after punching by application of India ink, or a similar ink. The sample frames at the right have very fine inking. In the days of three-strip Technicolor, and successive exposure Technicolor cartoons, where separate silver images were available, it was not uncommon to apply two punches, one being larger and circular and the other being smaller and "serrated", with these being done in contrasting colors.

== Use ==
Most projection booths in movie theaters in the past (and in some older theaters and studio screening rooms today) were equipped with two projectors side-by-side to project reels of film alternating between the two projectors. The cue mark was originally designed for such a setup.

In such a system, the projectionist had a projector running the currently playing reel (the outgoing projector) and a second incoming projector with the next reel to play, with each projector switching roles with each changeover. The projectionist would start the incoming projector with the changeover douser (shutter) closed as the first mark (the motor cue) appeared; the second projector would be threaded with the incoming reel parked 8 seconds (12 feet) of countdown ahead of the start of the picture section. The second mark (changeover cue) would alert the projectionist that the changeover was imminent, and one full second after the mark, he would trigger a solenoid that would open the incoming projector and another solenoid that would close the outgoing projector. The audio would be switched at this time as well; the audio for a particular film frame appears 20 frames (about 15 inches) before the image, and so all film prints carry the first two to three feet of audio of the reel they precede at their tail, called a sound pullup (digital systems use different offsets before or after the image, which a computer corrects for). Film prints could be prepped by a projectionist with automatic changeover cues, which were small metallic appliqués which could be applied to a print at the first cue mark. Readers attached to the projector would read the marks and execute the changeover sequence automatically, as long as the incoming reel was threaded properly on the second projector.

However, most modern movie film projection systems have the film loaded on a very large horizontally oriented platter (often colloquially known as a "cakestand"), in which all the reels of a movie are spliced together into one large contiguous wind of film filling the platter. Studios and preservation libraries that allow their archival or other rare prints to be exhibited typically demand that a twin projection system still be used so that their prints are not cut up for assembly.

Such newer platter-based projectors would eliminate the need for cue marks, but the marks are still present on modern-day motion picture projection prints, mainly for older theaters and studio screening rooms still using two-projector setups, and also to aid the projectionist in identifying reel ends during the splicing together of the reels onto a platter in newer theaters.

In past years, certainly up to the late 1960s, cue marks were applied to the composited camera original negative, but no longer. Cue marks are now applied to the printing internegative, only, and these marks appear to be black, because the mark is made on a negative image, suitable for release print making, only. However, for many films, particularly those for which Academy consideration is anticipated, a special kind of film print, known variously as a "Showprint" (a trademark) or an "EK" (a generic name, after Eastman Kodak), is indeed made directly from the composited camera original negative. In these cases, the cue marks are manually applied to the finished film prints, and these marks appear to be white, because the mark is made on a positive image suitable for direct projection. A typical print run of such "Showprints" or "EKs" might be about five prints, with one being intended for a Los Angeles engagement (required by the Academy for its consideration), possibly one for a New York engagement, possibly one for the producer, possibly one for the distributor, and one for archival purposes.

=== Cue dots in television ===
In television, a similar idea is used to signal to a control room that a transition of some sort is about to occur on the broadcast (such as a commercial break). The most common type of television cue dot is the IBA style, used only in the United Kingdom, which consists of a small square in the top right corner of the screen, with black and white moving stripes. The other is a proprietary system used principally by the BBC (who do not air commercials). This version is a static square in the top left corner with a white-black-white pattern.

In the early days of television, some stations used a puncher or a scriber on film prints. This was seldom accurate and not all stations used the same five second / one second pattern. Viewers were often treated to distortion just before station breaks in any film that had been around a while. Although the Society of Motion Picture and Television Engineers attempted to standardize television cues, its efforts went largely unheeded. The wide variety of telecine projectors (Eastman Kodak 250 on the high-end and RCA TP-16 on the low-end, for 16mm, and RCA TP-35 on the high-end and General Precision 35 on the low-end, for 35mm) significantly prevented any such standardization. An early production company in France and Europe called Guild used a circle cue mark on their programs.

From the 1980s until the early 2000s, the cue dot was used extensively on the ITV and Channel 4 television networks in the United Kingdom as a commercial break was approaching. This was for the benefit of the regional playout centres who would need to run commercials for their broadcast areas. Automation and playout servers led to this being phased out and it is now used only for some live presentations, especially those with regional opt-outs or variable ad breaks. The cue dot appears about one minute before the break and disappears five seconds before the break starts. ITV use a spinning black-and-white ticker in the corner of the screen. In recent years, ITV have reduced usage of the cue dot to sporting events and other live broadcast programmes.

The BBC's main purpose of cue dots was to cue the following programme, either from a studio or from an outside broadcast.

Improvements in talkback and Presfax have made the BBC's usage of cue dots rare. The prevalence of digital television and the accompanying delays have made the use of cue dots to communicate with outside broadcast obsolete.

Cue dots do have some other uses: presentation may be asked to "flash your dots" by an outside broadcast unit to confirm that their off-air check feed is correct, particularly when working regionally. The dots are also used during coverage of the Wimbledon tennis championships to warn other broadcasters that the BBC feed will be cutting to an interview intended for the UK audience only, so they should be ready to go to something else.

== See also ==
- Coded anti-piracy, a different kind of mark used for watermarking
