= Projection booth =

A projection booth (US English), projection box (British English) or bio box (Australian English) is a room or enclosure for the machinery required for the display of movies on a reflective screen, located high on the back wall of the presentation space. It is common in a movie theater.

== History ==
During the early cinema period (1895 to the late 1900s approximately), the projector was typically located and operated within the theatre auditorium itself. The move to physically segregated projection booths resulted from the emergence of auditoria specifically designed for the projection of movies, which was caused by a combination of the growing popularity of cinema and increasing concerns over the safety risks of nitrate film. Projection booths that were segregated and equipped with fire prevention, fighting and containment infrastructure gradually became a legal requirement throughout the developed world.

A typical example of the regulation that emerged during this period was the fire safety provisions of the Cinematograph Act 1909 in the United Kingdom.

To maintain isolation between projection room and auditorium, windows were fitted in the projection room wall through which the image is projected and are usually made from a special, high grade glass designed to minimise distortion and light loss through absorption and reflection. They are often called portholes, as they were usually much smaller than the windows typically found in buildings. The origin of the reduced size dates back to the ability to manufacture glass without imperfections that could distort the image but more importantly these openings to the auditorium had to be made fireproof. Steel guillotine shutters were fixed over each window between projection room and the auditorium and in case of fire a low melting point fuse would release the shutters and isolate the projection room from the auditorium should the glass break from the heat of a fire. The room used to rewind the reels of film once screened was also isolated to reduce the risk of a catastrophic fire. Also in the rewind room would be the entire complement of film reels on site being stored in sealed steel bins with each reel in its own individual sealed compartment.

After the introduction of safety film in the early 1950s, projection booths remained useful for several other purposes. These include isolating the noise produced by opto-mechanical projectors from the audience, providing appropriate atmospheric control for the projection and film transport equipment (including, in more advanced booths, the use of HEPA air filtration to prevent dust contamination of the film prints in use), the provision of work space for the projectionist to prepare prints for projection and maintain the equipment, and the isolation of dangerous equipment and infrastructure (e.g. potentially explosive xenon bulbs and three-phase power) from untrained members of the public.

Historically, some movie projectors prior to modern automation would include a bell or other warning device, sometimes activated by centrifugal force when the supply reel reached an appropriate speed or a light beam detecting when the film on supply reel had reduced to a specified diameter. Two projectors would be used, requiring that the projectionist switch between the projector showing the reel coming to an end and the one about to screen the next reel. These 'Changeovers' would happen normally 5 or 6 times in one film depending on the length of the movie, each reel of film being approximately 20 minute in duration using safety film while the earlier reels of nitrate film were shorter at 10 minutes; 20 minute of nitrate film being considered too risky. Two sets of on-screen dots or circles of 4 frames in duration known as cue mark signified to the projectionist firstly to start the projector containing the incoming reel then the second cue mark indicated the time to switch from the outgoing reel to the incoming reel. The bell or other warning devise alerted the projectionist that end of the reel was imminent and attention would be required.

== Current usage ==
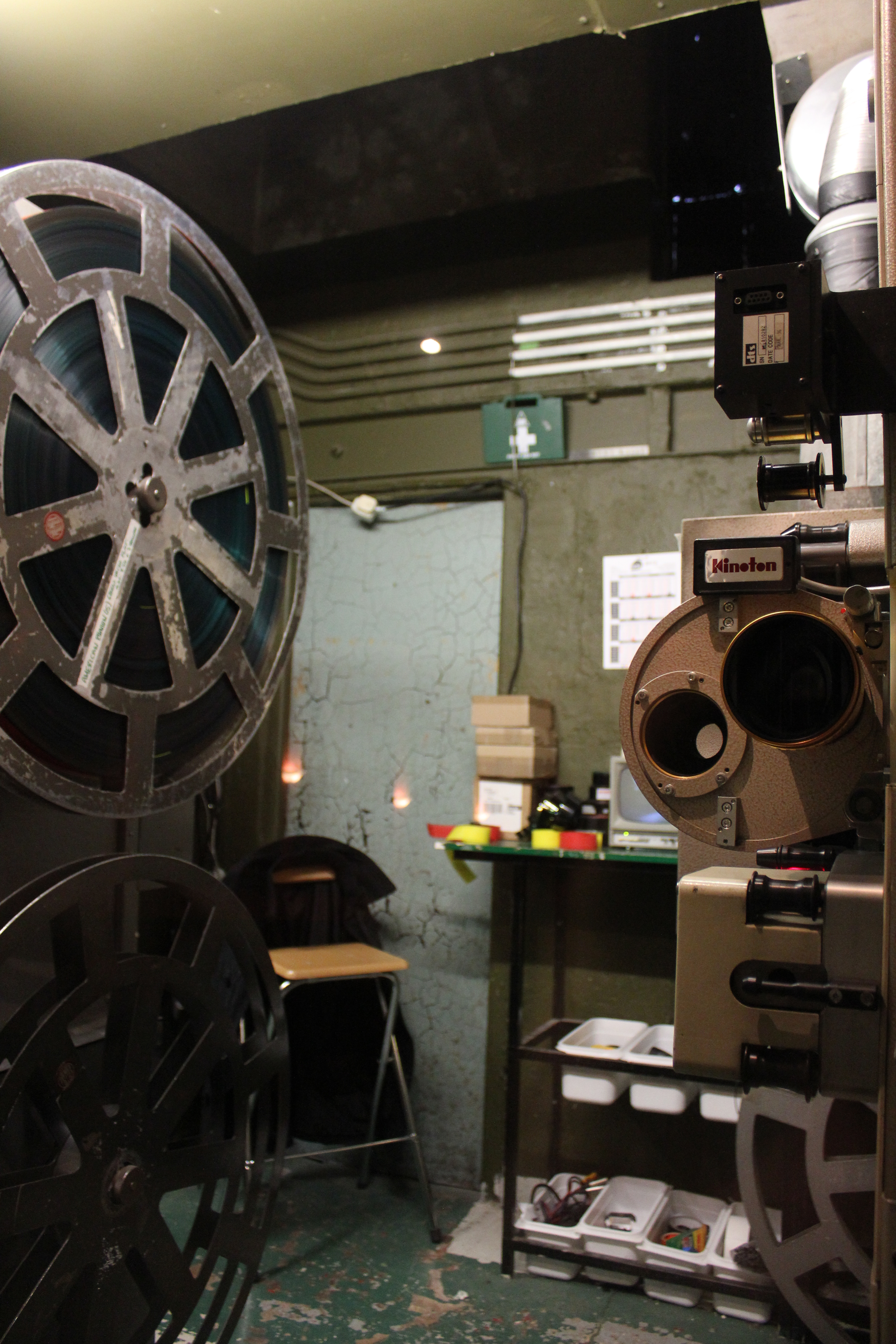
The projection booth in the Savoy Theatre, Monmouth

Modern cinemas are now highly automated and few would ever have a need to run nitrate film. The need to do changeovers has been effectively superseded with the introduction of continuous loop projection systems. These systems operate by having all the reels of film for the entire showing, main feature, supporting film, trailers etc all stuck together in one gigantic reel that is normally mounted horizontally and the film is fed from the centre of the spool to the projector where it is screened and then wound back on the outside of the same horizontal spool. Quite often these spools will be located some way from the projector and the film path may be over rollers along the ceiling of the projection room and surrounds. The lenses of the projector can be automatically rotated in front of the projector light aperture to accommodate the correct lens for a given format. The picture to the right shows a semi-automatic system using vertical spools that can hold an entire movie, however these are not the continuous loop projection systems and the film will need to be rewound after the screening. Also the rotating lens turret can be seen on the projector to the right of the image. Both of the automated methods of screening need very few staff in very often one projectionist will look after the screening of three or four auditoria in one cinema complex. Although there is no longer a need for the shutter or the small porthole like windows in the projection room they are still installed, mainly to reduce ambient light in the projection room reaching the screen.

The latest screening method used in projection is where the program is stored in a digital format on a computer hard drive and the content delivered on the drive itself or over the Internet. The main feature of this delivery is that the movie can be distributed instantly for blanket screening anywhere in the world. Encrypted data is emended into the movie governing the number of screening, times and dates etc This practice reduce cost in printing, reduces cost in transport, reduces bad press as most people get to see it before they read about it and it also reduces piracy as again most people see it before pirate copies have been made.

Some smaller theatres, as well as larger ones that have been split or refurbished since the introduction of digital cinema, have eliminated the booth altogether, replacing them with a semi-professional digital projector hung from the ceiling or rear wall of the auditorium.

== See also ==
- IMAX
- Lost film
- Planetarium
