= Projectionist =

Movie projector operator

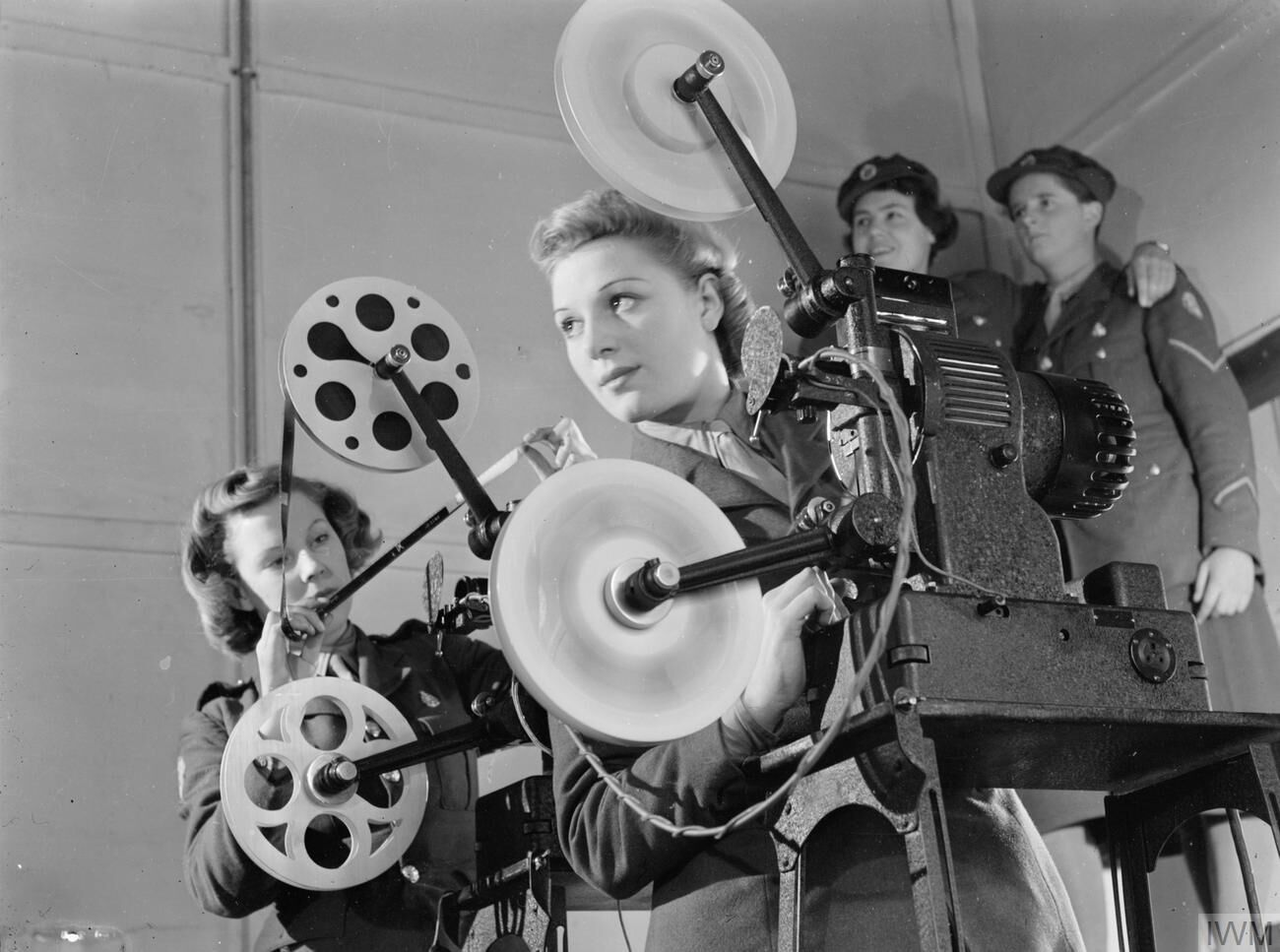
- Two Cine projectionists of the Auxiliary Territorial Service, Aldershot, Hampshire, England, UK, 1941

Occupation
- Occupation type: Profession
- Activity sectors: Entertainment, show business, movie theater, film

A projectionist is a person who operates a movie projector, particularly as an employee of a movie theater. Projectionists are also known as "operators".

== Historical background ==
N.B. The dates given in the subject headings are approximate.

=== Early cinema (1895–1915) ===
The need for professional projectionists arose from the commercial showing of movie films to the general public in buildings specifically designed for the purpose or using variety theatres as part of the "bill", which began towards the end of the first decade of the twentieth century. Before the emergence of purpose-built movie theaters, film projectors in venues such as fairgrounds, music halls and Nickelodeons were usually operated by a showman or presenter, in the same way as a lanternist. The light source for most projectors in the early period was limelight, which did not require an electricity supply.

Between approximately 1905 and 1915, two factors combined to transform the role of the projectionist into a separate job with a specific profile of skills and training. Concerns over the flammability of nitrate film, following several major fires during the cinema's first decade resulted in the increasing regulation of film exhibition, including the requirement that projectors be housed in fireproof booths, segregated from the auditorium. In the United Kingdom, for example, this requirement was introduced in the Cinematograph Act 1909, and effectively prevented the projectionist from also carrying out a public-facing role. The legal right to act as a projectionist in a public movie theater was, and to some extent still is, regulated, to varying degrees in different jurisdictions. Some required projectionists to be licensed by local or central government, and this process sometimes required projectionists to undergo assessments or sit exams. Trade union-based regulation of the profession was also widespread in some jurisdictions, in which the licensing of projectionists was incorporated into collective bargaining agreements between employers and unions. In the United States, projectionists were sometimes 'pooled out' to theatre companies via their union. Closed shop working by projectionists was common in British cinema chains until the early 1980s. The original reason for this regulation was the necessity for safety precautions for the screening of nitrate prints, and hence the requirement that projectionists should be formally trained to handle them to ensure public safety. But the formal training and licensing of projectionists continued in most of the US and Europe well after nitrate had been superseded in the 1950s, and in a minority of jurisdictions it still continues.

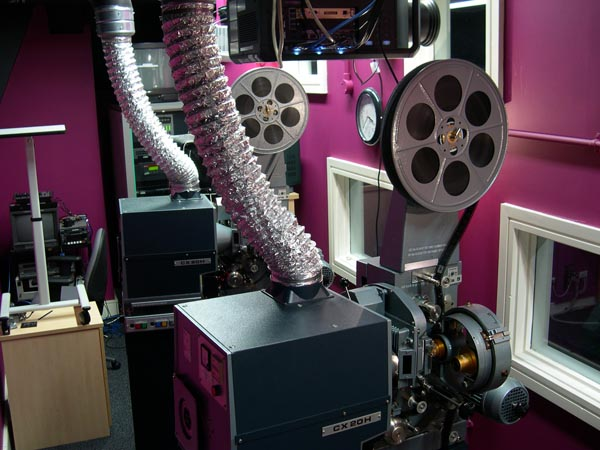
Two projectors installed in a changeover configuration. The machine in the background will show the first reel, at the end of which the projectionist will 'change over' to reel 2, which is threaded on the projector in the foreground. If the procedure is performed correctly, the audience will be unaware that it has happened.

=== Classical period (1915–1953) ===
With the advent of feature-length films during the early to mid-teens and the increasing tendency for film screenings to be the main or only event that took place in a purpose-built theater, rather than incorporated into other forms of live entertainment, the role of the projectionist became more specialized and began to incorporate elements of showmanship once again. The safety precautions associated with nitrate required 35mm film prints to be shipped in reels no longer than 1,000 feet (approximately 15 minutes at 16fps). In order show a feature-length film without interruption while the following reel is laced up, two projectors focused on the same screen were used, with the projectionist 'changing over' from one to the other at the end of each reel. 2,000 foot 'double' reels were gradually introduced from the early 1930s onwards (approximately 20 minutes at the standardized sound speed of 24 fps). Until the conversion to sound, electric motors were relatively uncommon on 35mm theater projectors: most were hand-cranked by the projectionist. Contemporary accounts suggest that hand cranking at a consistent speed took a considerable amount of skill. Presentation technique also began to include tasks such as operating auditorium lighting systems [dimmers], curtains [side-tabs] and masking systems and lantern slide projectors. During the 1920s, movie theaters became larger and projection equipment had to adapt to this. Limelight illumination was replaced by the electrically powered carbon arc lamp, and with the arrival of sound electric motors were installed to drive projectors (a more constant speed was required for sound playback than could be achieved by hand cranking). The operation and basic maintenance of audio equipment also became part of the projectionist's job following the introduction of sound.

=== Post-classical period (1953–early 1980s) ===
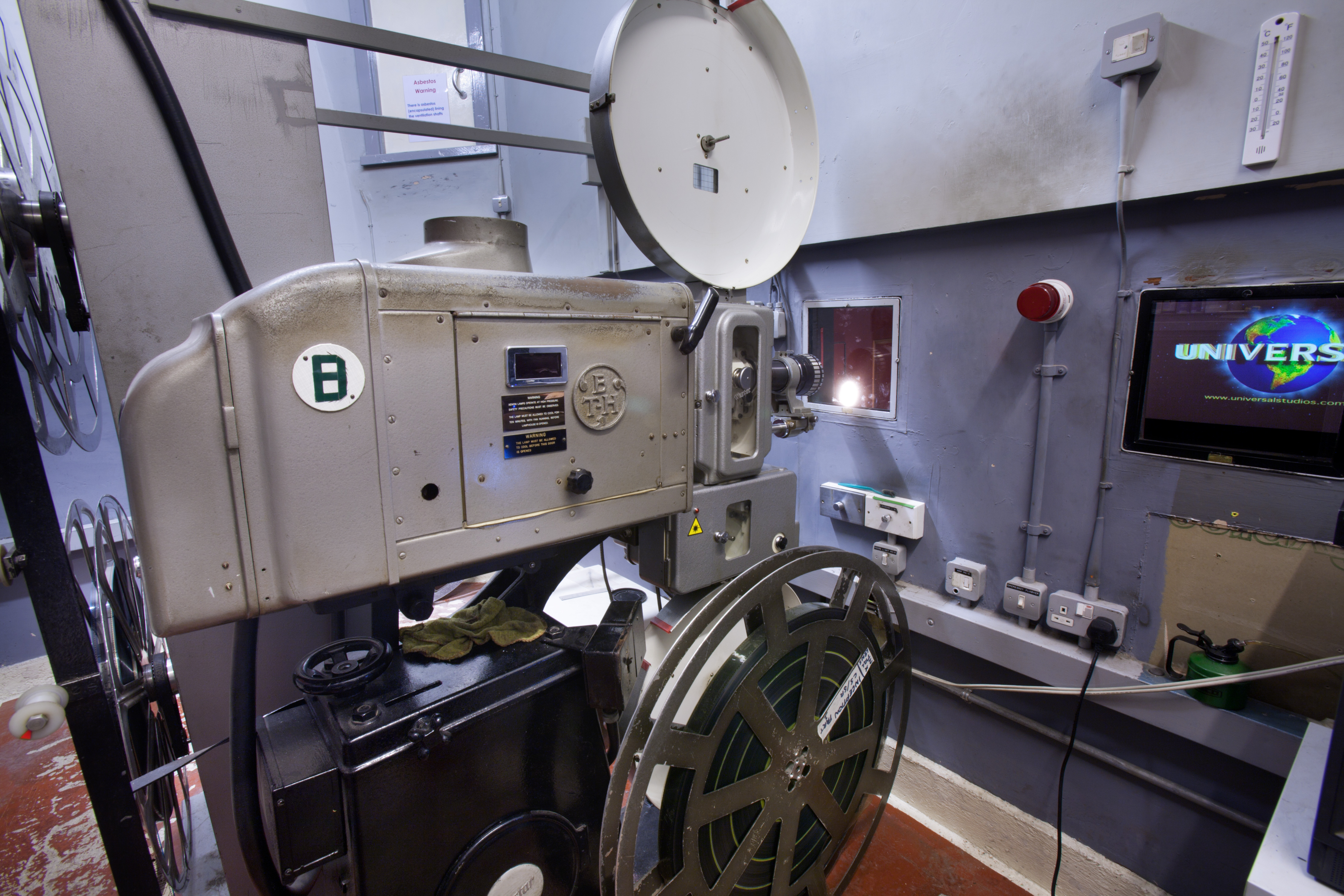
The projector inside the booth used by the projectionist

The technology of cinema projection, and with it the role of the projectionist, changed fundamentally over an extended period between the early 1950s and late 1960s. Nitrate film was superseded by cellulose triacetate for release prints in the US and Europe over about a five-year period following the stock's commercial launch in October 1948 (though older nitrate prints remained in circulation for quite a long time afterwards and are still occasionally utilized in licensed cinemas for special screenings). With nitrate went the restrictions on reel lengths previously necessitated by the fire risk, with the result that systems were developed to enable the projection of a complete feature film using a single, unattended projector. Two essential technologies were needed to enable this: the long-play device, a.k.a. platter, i.e. a turntable 4–6 feet in diameter or (in the case of Sword Systems and Sabre Systems by EPRAD) an extremely large film reel 3–5 feet in diameter either of which enabled the reels of a feature presentation to be joined together into a single roll, in some cases up to 30,000 feet (approx. six hours at 24fps) in length; and the xenon arc lamp, which can burn continuously and unattended for as long as is needed (most carbon arc lamphouses will run for a maximum of 40–50 minutes before the carbon rod needs replacing, and require regular adjustment by the projectionist during that time). Automation systems were also introduced, which could be programmed in advance of each screening to perform functions such as operating auditorium lighting, adjusting volume levels and changing audio formats. Some would argue that these technologies reduced the skill level or downgraded the showmanship element of the projectionist's job (for example, by eliminating the need for changeovers and nitrate handling precautions). Others would argue that more advanced skills were needed in other areas. With the introduction of widescreen in the early 1950s, projectionists had to cope with the additional lenses, aperture plates and masking systems needed for different aspect ratios for the first time. Multiple channel audio systems using magnetic sound and 70mm film prints were also introduced in the 1950s, and these required specialist projection skills to handle. Like nitrate film prints, xenon arc bulbs require special safety precautions: if handled incorrectly they can explode, causing serious injury to the projectionist. Staffing levels in projection booths decreased rapidly during this period. In the classical "movie palace", the labour-intensive nature of changeovers, carbon arc lamps, and nitrate handling required large workforces of projectionists, with up to six or seven working in a single booth and a rigid management hierarchy within the profession being common. In contrast, the multiplexes of the 1980s and '90s were designed in such a way that a single projectionist can operate simultaneous screenings in 10-20 auditoria, and it is unusual for these venues to have a total projectionist workforce of more than three or four.

=== Final film period (early 1980s–2000s) ===
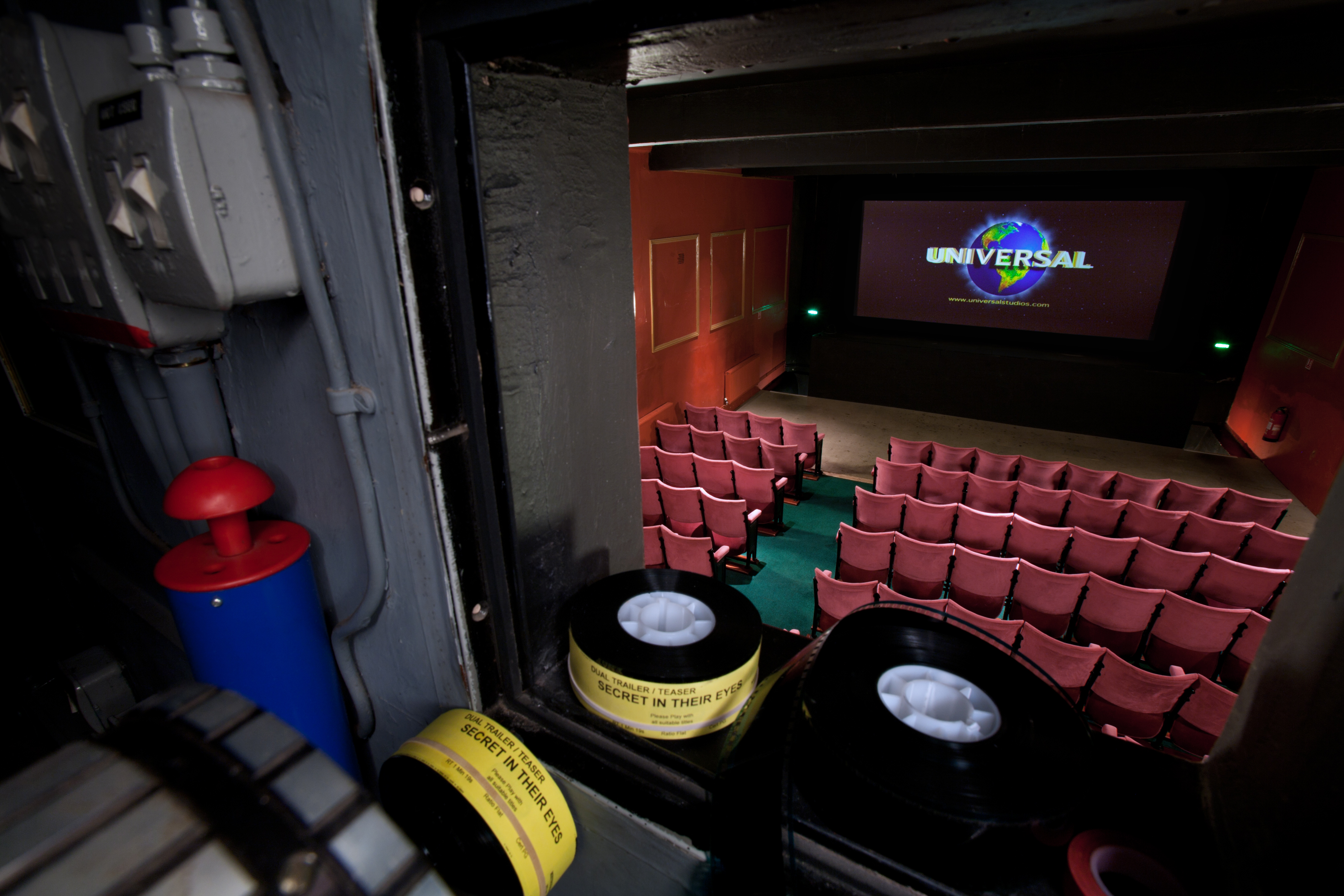
The view from a projectionist's booth at the Ultimate Picture Palace in Oxford

The job description of the projectionist began to vary considerably according to the type and location of theatre he or she worked in. In many of the multiplex theatre chains that emerged in the 1980s, the role of the projectionist was largely confined to assembling screening programs (consisting of a feature film print and other supporting material such as advertisements and trailers) onto a long-play platter or tower device, programming automation systems and very basic equipment maintenance such as cleaning film path components and the routine replacement of life-limited parts. More extensive maintenance and repairs are carried out by technicians employed centrally by the parent company and who visit its theatres to conduct maintenance on a regular cycle. In smaller chains and independent theaters, and especially those situated in geographically remote locations, projectionists are more likely to undertake more extensive maintenance and repair duties, both on a theater's projection and sound equipment and on other infrastructure in the building, e.g. heating and air conditioning plant. 35mm release prints continue to be shipped on 2,000 foot reels to the present day, even though very few theaters still present films using a two-projector system with changeovers. A number of attempts have been made over the years to introduce larger shipping reels for print distribution, but none has gained widespread acceptance.

=== Digital cinema period (2010s–present) ===
Some larger theater chains are now in the process of eliminating the projectionist's job altogether. In order to avoid paying a higher wage rate and to circumvent skilled labor laws, some companies (such as Cinemark Theaters) use the job title "Booth Usher" for an employee who simply carries out basic screening operations and does not perform any program assembly, maintenance or repair procedures. Their starting wage is the same as that for popcorn concessionists and ushers ($7.84 per hour in Ohio as of August 2009). Smaller theaters in this chain and those with union bargaining contracts that specify a minimum wage utilize management for these duties. In Britain, this started to happen early 2000 onward as labour laws were wiped out by then.

The introduction of digital cinema projection, on a significant scale from approximately 2006 to 2008, is rapidly bringing to an end the role of the projectionist as a professionally skilled operator of film-based projection equipment in mainstream theatres. As of November 2010, the major chains in the US and Europe are in the process of a large-scale conversion to digital projection, in some ways comparable to the mass installation of sound equipment in the late 1920s and early 1930s. This has essentially been made possible by the virtual print fee model of financing the equipment and installation costs, in which studios and equipment manufacturers provide equipment to theatres on a hire-purchase basis. The basic operation of digital cinema servers and projectors requires little more than routine IT skills and can be performed by a theatre's front-of-house and managerial staff with minimal extra training. Within a few years, it is likely that projectionists, in the traditional sense of the word, will only be found in the small number of arthouse, cinematheque and repertory theatres that will continue to show film prints from archival collections. In May 2013, the BBC reported that by October 2013, "there will be no cinemas left in this country projecting 35mm".

== Elements of the job ==
A projectionist in a modern theater in North America or Europe will typically carry out some or all of the following duties.

=== Film presentation ===
- Receiving film prints delivered from the distributor and completing the shipping formalities.
- Examining prints on a workbench to determine the image, sound format and other information needed to screen them correctly.
- Examining prints to check for physical damage that could prevent the print from being screened without a breakdown, e.g. edge damage, split or strained perforations and defective splices. If there is a significant amount of dirt or scratching on the print, the projectionist may determine that it is of an unacceptably low quality for presentation and return it to the distributor for a replacement.
- "Making up" the reels of a release print onto a long-play platter or tower device, complete with the supporting material in the screening program, e.g. advertisements, trailers and animated company logos or announcement snipes, for example asking members of the audience to switch off their mobile phones.
- If the print is to be shown on a two-projector system, ensuring that the leaders and tails of each reel are spliced to the picture footage correctly and that the visual changeover cues are present.
- Programming automation systems to perform presentation functions. This can sometimes take the form of placing self-adhesive cues on the film print in the desired location (e.g. when you want the house lights to be dimmed), which are then detected by an optical reader in the projector's film path.
- Cleaning the surfaces in the projector's film path that come into contact with or proximity to the film surface.
- "Lacing up" the film through the projector and film path to and from any long play device.
- Carrying out presentation operations manually if an automation system is not in use.
- "Taking down" the reels of a print and supporting programme after the final screening, and spooling them back into 2,000 foot lengths.
- Dispatching film prints for return to the distributor, or sometimes a "crossover" direct to another theater, and completing the shipping formalities.

=== Maintenance and repair ===
- Replacement of xenon arc bulbs at the end of their service life, and completing the shipping formalities for their return to the vendor for safe disposal.
- Periodic adjustment of lamphouse reflectors to ensure even and optimum illumination.
- Depending on the type of projector in use, maintenance of the mechanism, e.g. periodic draining and replacement of oil in the intermittent mechanism, and/or replacement of drive belts.
- Periodic replacement of other life-limited parts of projection booth equipment, e.g. pressure plates and runners.
- Periodic adjustment of the A-chain of the optical sound system, in order to ensure optimum focus and alignment.
- Periodic adjustment of the motor control systems in a long-play device, in order to ensure optimum feed and take-up.
- The regular projection of technical test films, e.g. the SMPTE's RP-40 and Dolby's "Jiffy" films, to evaluate the image and sound quality in the theater.

== Notable projectionists ==
- Emile Massicotte, Laurier Palace Theatre, Montreal, Quebec, Canada - Credited with saving 30 children on 9 January 1927 fire in which 78 others were killed.
- Donna Margaret Lafy Hatch, Keystone Theatre Towanda, Pennsylvania - First woman projectionist licensed in Pennsylvania, 1961

== Bibliography ==
- Barnard, Timothy, The 'Machine Operator': Deus ex machina of the Storefront Cinema, Framework, vol. 43, no. 1 (Spring 2002).
- British Kinematograph, Sound and Television Society (BKSTS), Motion Picture Presentation Manual, London, BKSTS (1977).
- Cameron, James R., Motion Picture Projection, 3rd edition, New York, Technical Book Co. (1922).
- Cameron, James R., Motion Pictures With Sound, Manhattan Beach, New York, Cameron Publishing Co. (1929).
- Happé, L. Bernard, Basic Motion Picture Technology, 2nd edition, London, Focal Press (1975).
- Miehling, Rudolph, Sound Projection, New York, Mancall (1929).
- Sætervadet, Torkell, The Advanced Projection Manual: Presenting Classic Films in a Modern Projection Environment, Oslo, The Norwegian Film Institute (2006), ISBN 2-9600296-1-5.
- Sætervadet, Torkell, FIAF Digital Projection Guide, Brussels, Fédération Internationale des Archives du Film (2012), ISBN 978-2960029628.
