= FotoKem =

American film laboratory

Fotokem Industries Inc.
- Industry: Post production
- Founded: 1963; 62 years ago
- Founder: Gerald Brodersen
- Headquarters: Burbank, CA
- Products: Motion picture film processing and post production
- Website: www.fotokem.com

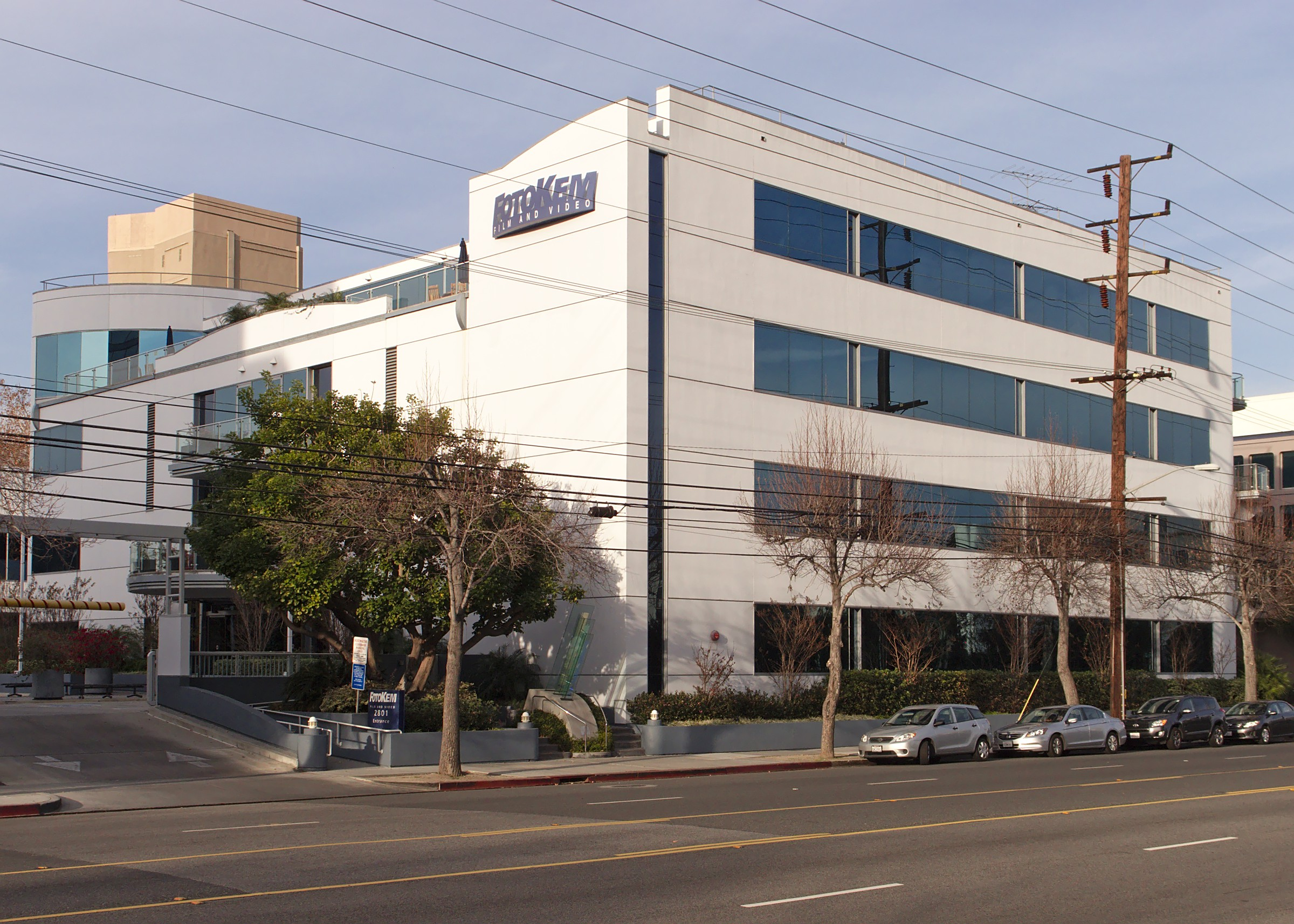
Location in Burbank 2015

FotoKem Industries Inc., doing business as FotoKem Laboratory, is a film laboratory and post-production studio located in Burbank, California. The company was founded in 1963.

== History ==
Fotokem was founded by Gerald Brodersen in 1963, starting as a small scale film laboratory in California for independent film productions.

Services include telecine from 16mm, 35mm and 65mm to standard definition or high definition; high-resolution scans; film scanning and recording; DVD-creation; editing; digital intermediates, optical track creation; nonlinear finishing; titling, video duplication and standards conversion; global data delivery; encoding; and other services related to the completion of a motion picture feature, television series, commercial, or other professional film production.

In 2004, Fotokem acquired the assets of Imagica USA, which enabled the lab 65 mm film post production workflows. To date until 2023, Fotokem is the only film lab still able to produce photochemical 70 mm film prints (especially IMAX format film print (Note: Previously, Consolidated Film Industries was one of the film labs able to produces 70 mm IMAX prints, until its parent company Technicolor ceased its operation in 2008.)). Notable works include Christopher Nolan's Memento, Interstellar and films onwards.

In 2019, FotoKem expanded its creative post-production services in Santa Monica. FotoKem Santa Monica is linked to the company's Burbank and Hollywood locations via a secure fiber network, ensuring that feature-film and episodic finishing work can take place in real-time among all locations.

== See also ==
- Spirit DataCine
- Post-production
- History of film
- Studio zone
