= Definity =

Definity may refer to:

- Definity (film recorder)
- Avaya Definity, the Avaya Definity PBX
- Perflutren, with the trade name Definity, is a type of microbubble contrast agent
- Definity Inc., financial company and owns several insurance companies.
