= Piss filter =

Piss filter or pee filter may refer to:

- Human waste filtering systems used in space toilets
- Mexican filter, yellow colour tint used in films and video games
- Piss filter, a colloqual name for visual artifacts in AI-generated images
