= Cinevator =

Film recorder/printer series

Cinevator is a series of real time film recorder/printers produced by the Norwegian company Piql AS (previously named Cinevation). Piql AS is based in Drammen, Norway. The Cinevator is currently available in three versions:

== Cinevator HD ==
The Cinevator HD is the entry-level model. It is available as a film recorder only or as a combined film recorder/film printer with sound and subtitles. The Cinevator HD records 24/25 frames per second in native HD resolution on all supported film stocks. Its imaging engine is based on DLP technology from Texas Instruments and a patented LED light source.

== Cinevator One ==
The Cinevator One is a digital film recorder that operates in real time. This machine produces negative intermediate images in the speed of 24 frames per second. The Cinevator One receives film data in real time through an SDI link or DVI input. Based on the film data available, recording or printing jobs are prepared on a job preparation workstation (a normal desktop PC that is connected to the Cinevator One). Sound and subtitle files are loaded through the job preparation workstation. Remote Disk Recorders or VTR's can be connected to the Cinevator One through Ethernet or serial line, and these can be controlled from the job preparation work station.

== Cinevator Five ==
The Cinevator Five is the top model of the range, making it possible to go directly to positive print film including both digital and analog sound and subtitles in real time. Going directly to print film eliminates all the processes involving negative intermediate and the contact printing that might deteriorate the image and sound quality. This machine can also make negative intermediate and interpositive film. Sound is recorded from either Dolby CA-10R (via MO disk), DTS time code generator or embedded sound on a disk recorder or VTR. Remote disk recorders or VTRs can be connected to the Cinevator Five through Ethernet or serial line.

The subtitle feature is improved greatly in the recent times and one can even change color and size of subtitle and also its placement in the frame. There is a sharp shadow at the edge of the subtitle which make the subtitle visible clearly even on same color background.

In March 2008, the Cinevator Five won the Red Dot Design Award.

== See also ==
- Digital intermediate
- Filmmaking
- Film-out
- Post-production
