= Adage, Inc. =

US electronics and computer manufacturer

- Industry: Computer
- Founded: 1957; 69 years ago in Boston, Massachusetts, United States
- Founder: James I. "Jim" Stockwell
- Defunct: 1994; 32 years ago
- Fate: Acquired by Systems & Computer Technology Corporation

Adage, Inc., was a Boston-based electronics and computer manufacturer founded in 1957, first specializing in analog-to-digital and digital-to-analog converters, and later in computer graphics systems.

It was founded by James I. "Jim" Stockwell and two other MIT graduates in Boston in 1957, and later moved to Billerica.

Starting in 1967, Adage focused on computer graphics systems. Its most advanced system in 1967 was the GS/300. In 1976, it introduced the GT/2250 Vector Graphics Workstation, which was plug compatible with the IBM 2250 Graphics Display Unit; it later created the Adage 4000 and, in 1985, the Adage 6000 series workstation.

In 1989, Adage held merger talks with various potential partners, including Multiflow Computer and GBIC, but they were not consummated. Adage was acquired by Systems & Computer Technology Corporation for US$5 million in 1994.

== Bibliography ==
- Thomas G. Hagan, Richard J. Nixon, Luis J. Schaefer, "The Adage Graphics Terminal", Proceedings of the December 9-11, 1968, Fall Joint Computer Conference 1:747-755 ACM, 1968. full text
- Materials about Adage for the Computer and Image Exhibit, Computer History Museum,
- A. van Dam, R.D. Bergeron, "Software Capabilities of the Adage Graphics Terminals" in R.D. Parslow, et al., Advanced Computer Graphics, 1971 preview
