= Pandora International =

English video editing system manufacturer

Pandora International was an Emmy award winning, English maker of hardware and software for telecine control and colour correction in post production film editing.

== History ==
Pandora International began trading in 1988 led by Steve Brett and Martin Greenwood, initially in Northfleet.

Pandora's twin Motorola 68020 Pogle could control telecine machines such as the Spirit DataCine FDL 60, FDL 90 and Quadra, and four video tape decks, for field accurate editing including three-two sequence control. Later versions used Silicon Graphics SGI Indy and SGI O2 computers.

Pandora's DCP external colour corrector implemented Rec 601 and was one of the first able to directly accept digital input from film or video tape, with support for NTSC and PAL.

The PiXi colour corrector was launched in 1995, to replace the DCP and supported video resolutions up to 1920x1080 at 30 frames per second. A version of PiXi was incorporated into Picasso from Post Impressions and used by Industrial Light & Magic for "The Phantom Menace" and "Attack of the Clones".

In 1997, Pandora introduced the MegaDEF comprising two PiXi with an additional multiplexer. It was the first commercially available system capable of 2048x1556 resolution in real time. The MegaDEF could be used with both Spirit DataCines and from 1999, the Philips Specter VDC-2000 virtual telecine and was controlled by a Pogle Platinum controller. 1998 movie Pleasantville included scenes where a MegaDEF removed selected colours.

2000 movie O Brother, Where Art Thou? was scanned by Kodak with a Spirit Datacine and colour-corrected using a Pandora Pogle controlled MegaDEF at its Cinesite facility in Hollywood. The tree and grass backgrounds were changed from greens to a yellow/brown Dust Bowl effect.

Pandora was awarded an Emmy in 2001, in recognition of its pioneering work developing the concept of digital intermediates.

In 2001, Pandora International moved to nearby Greenhithe. It purchased Ingress Abbey as its headquarters but after a dispute with developer Crest Nicholson, sold it in 2012.

MegaDEF could be interfaced to the Quantel iQ using a proprietary optical fiber connection and systems were sold to Peter Jackson during his filming of the Lord of the Rings trilogy.

The company's final products included Evolution, an updated Pogle colour suite telecine controller and Revolution, a non linear colour corrector capable of 4096x3072 resolution in real time.

Following a 2013 application by the Official Receiver, Pandora International was dissolved in 2016.

== Gallery ==
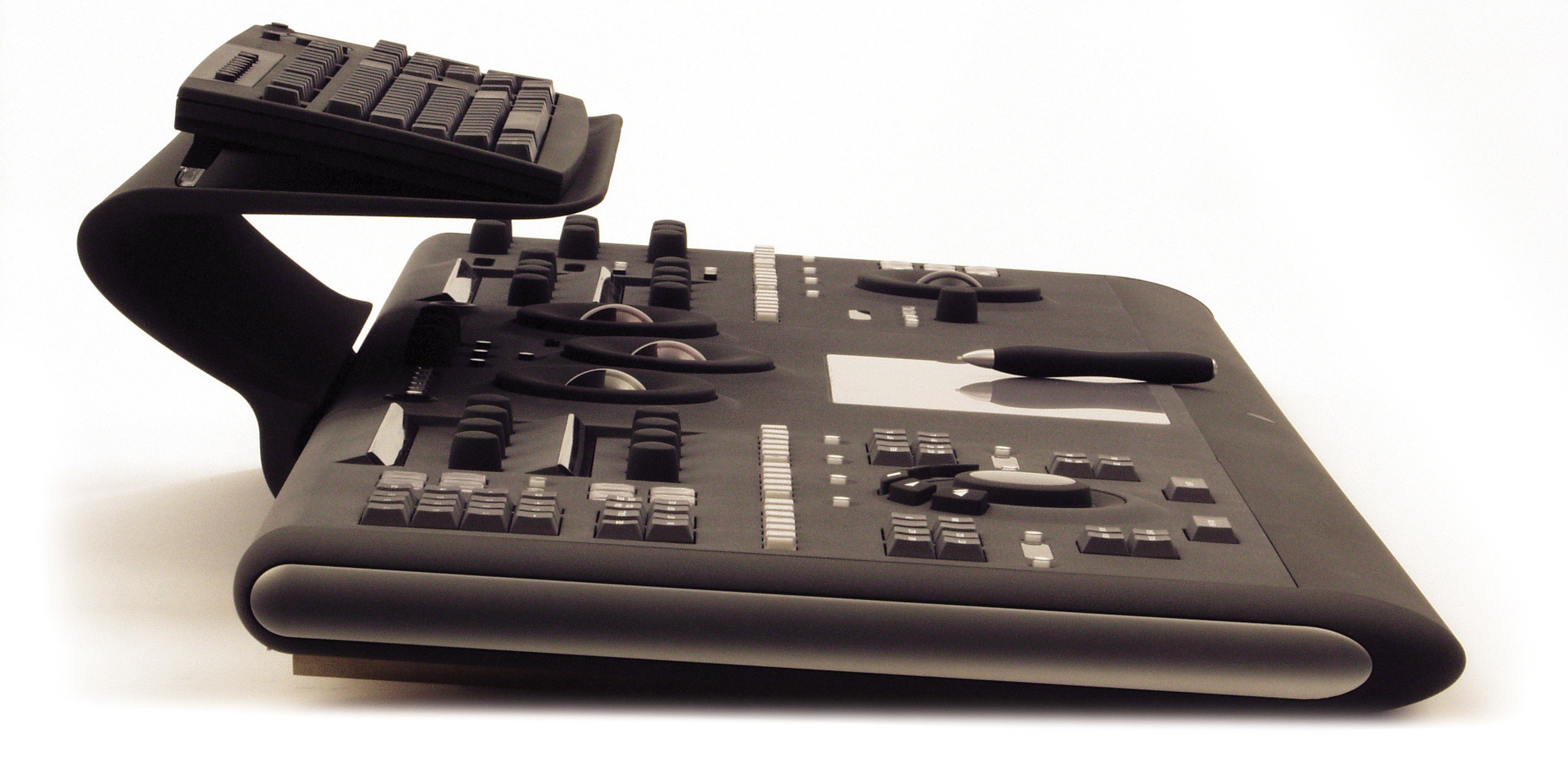
Evolution Control Panel (Pogle)

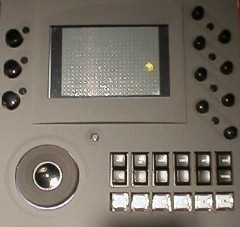
Pogle control panel and soft knob display

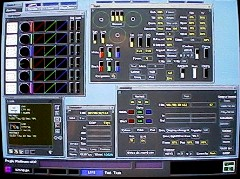
Pogle SGI display

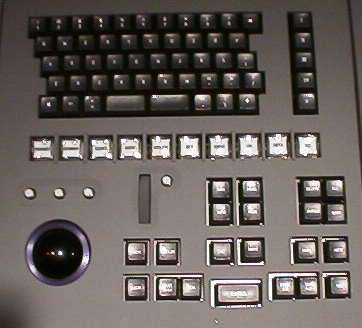
Pogle control panel and keyboard

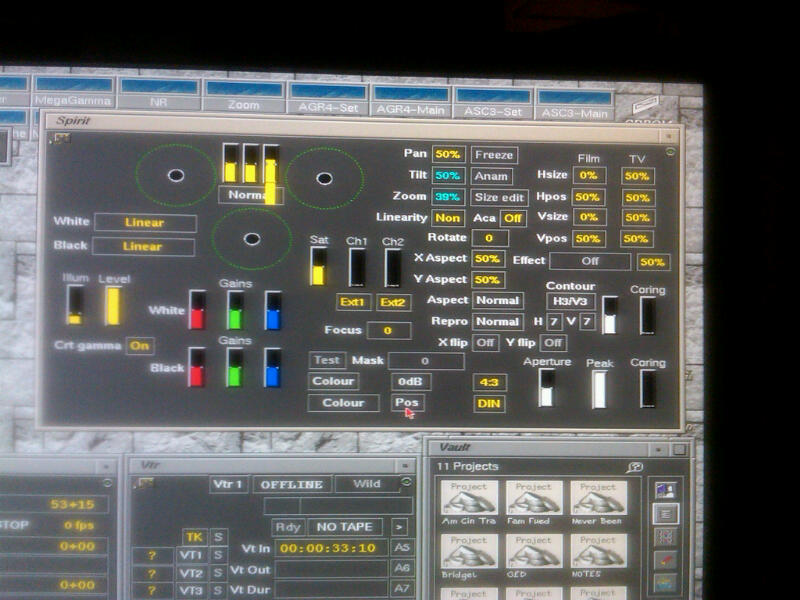
Pogle display close up of telecine control menu

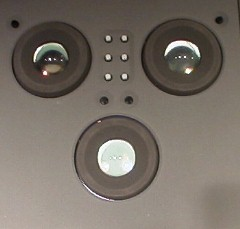
Pogle control panel joyballs

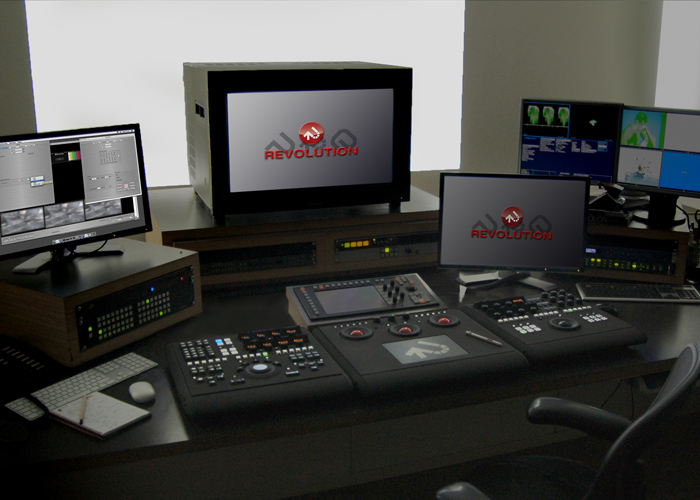
Pandora system

== See also ==
- Da Vinci Systems
- Cintel
- Final Cut Pro
- Media Composer
