= Definity (film recorder) =

- Definity LCD film recorder on show at IBC 2008.
- Manufacturer: CCG GmbH
- Type: LCD digital film recorder

Definity is a digital film recorder produced by CCG Digital Image Technology, designed for motion pictures. It succeeded Agfa-Gevaert's film recorder division and was launched in Las Vegas at NAB in 2004.

== Overview ==
Definity uses a monochrome high resolution LCD panel to record digital sequences onto motion picture film, rather than the analog technologies previously used. Prior to Definity's release, LCD technology was thought to be unsuitable for film recording due to its limitations in bit depth, temporary image retention (TIR), and less saturated colors.

Definity's imaging unit uses the sub-pixel structure of the LCD to record anamorphic "CinemaScope" material without sacrificing horizontal image information. By using its anamorphic pixels (with an aspect ratio of 3:1) instead of the standard square pixels, flat widescreen material with an aspect ratio of 2.36:1 can be horizontally compressed on the LCD, resulting in a 1.18:1 image that can be transferred onto film without sacrificing image information.

In 2010, CCG Digital Image Technology incorporated a full LED system to increase contrast and density range by using 4320 RGB, which improved speed and contrast ratio.

== See also ==
- Digital intermediate
