= Mexican filter =

Yellow color filter sometimes applied in films to depict Mexican locations

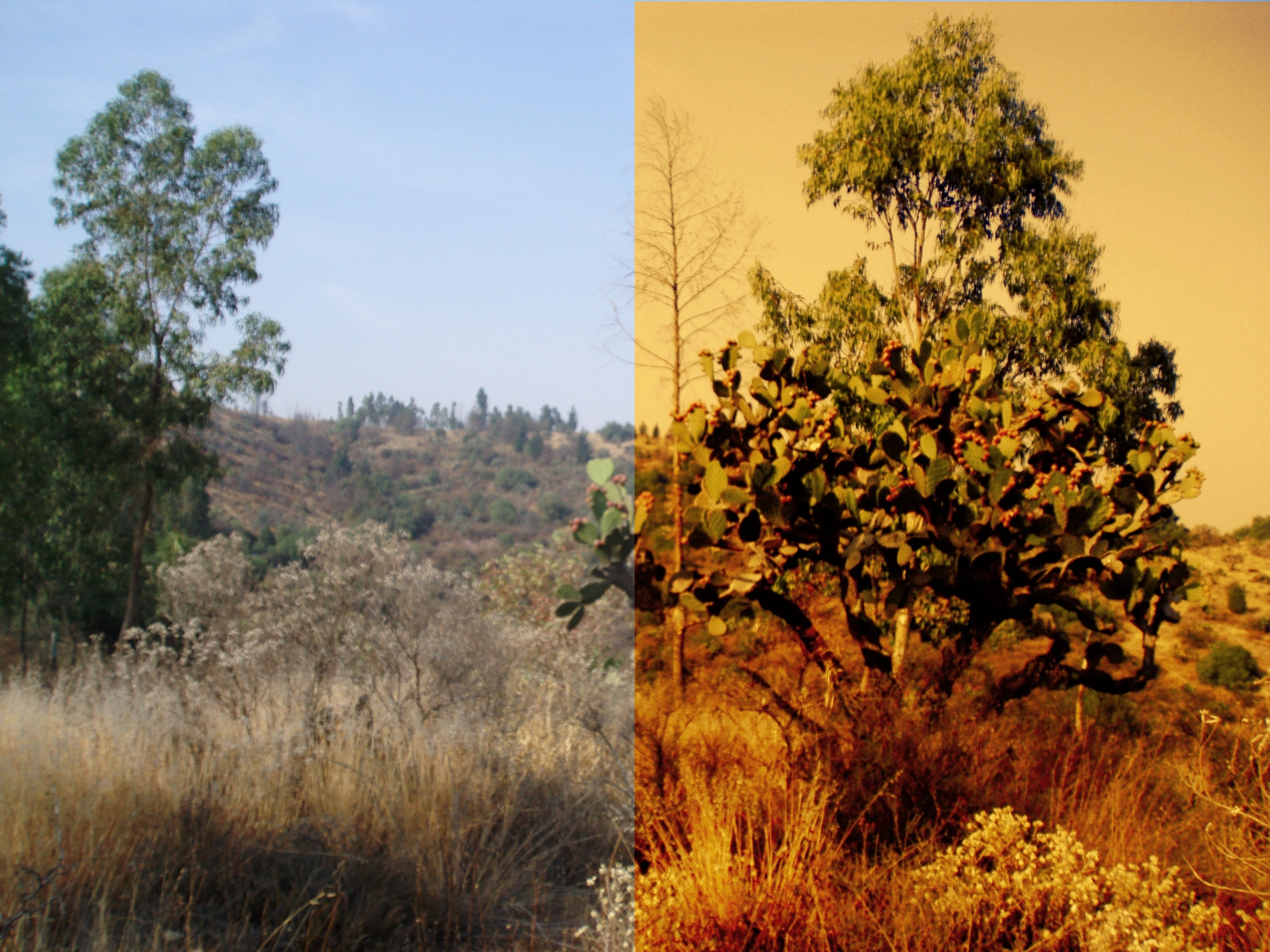
A photograph showing a filter added to half of an image of a Mexican landscape

The Mexican filter, or Mexico filter, is a yellow-colored or sepia filter or overly warm color grade that is sometimes employed in films and television productions to visually represent scenes set in hot, arid areas, often countries such as Mexico, as well as other Latin American and South Asian countries.

== History ==
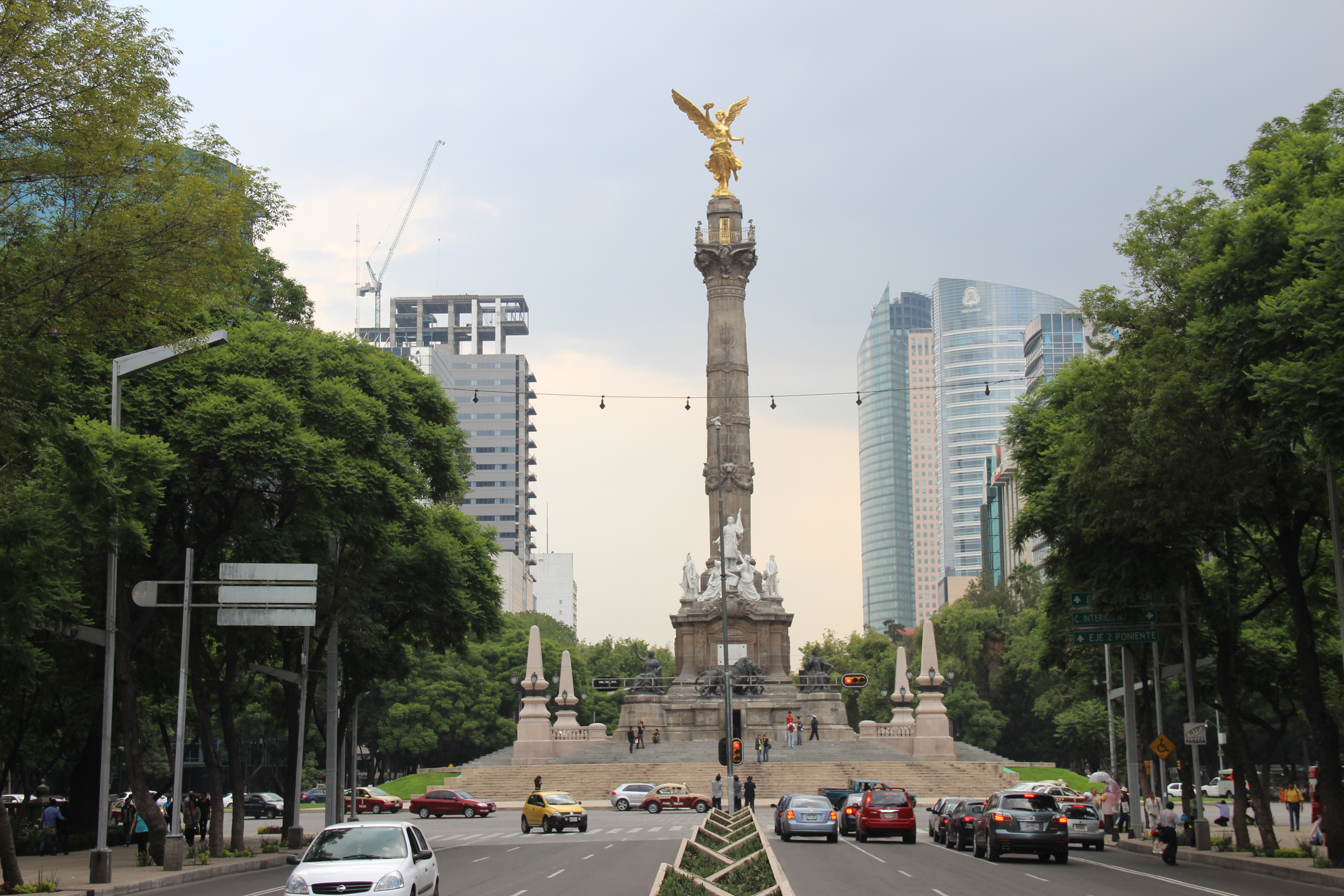
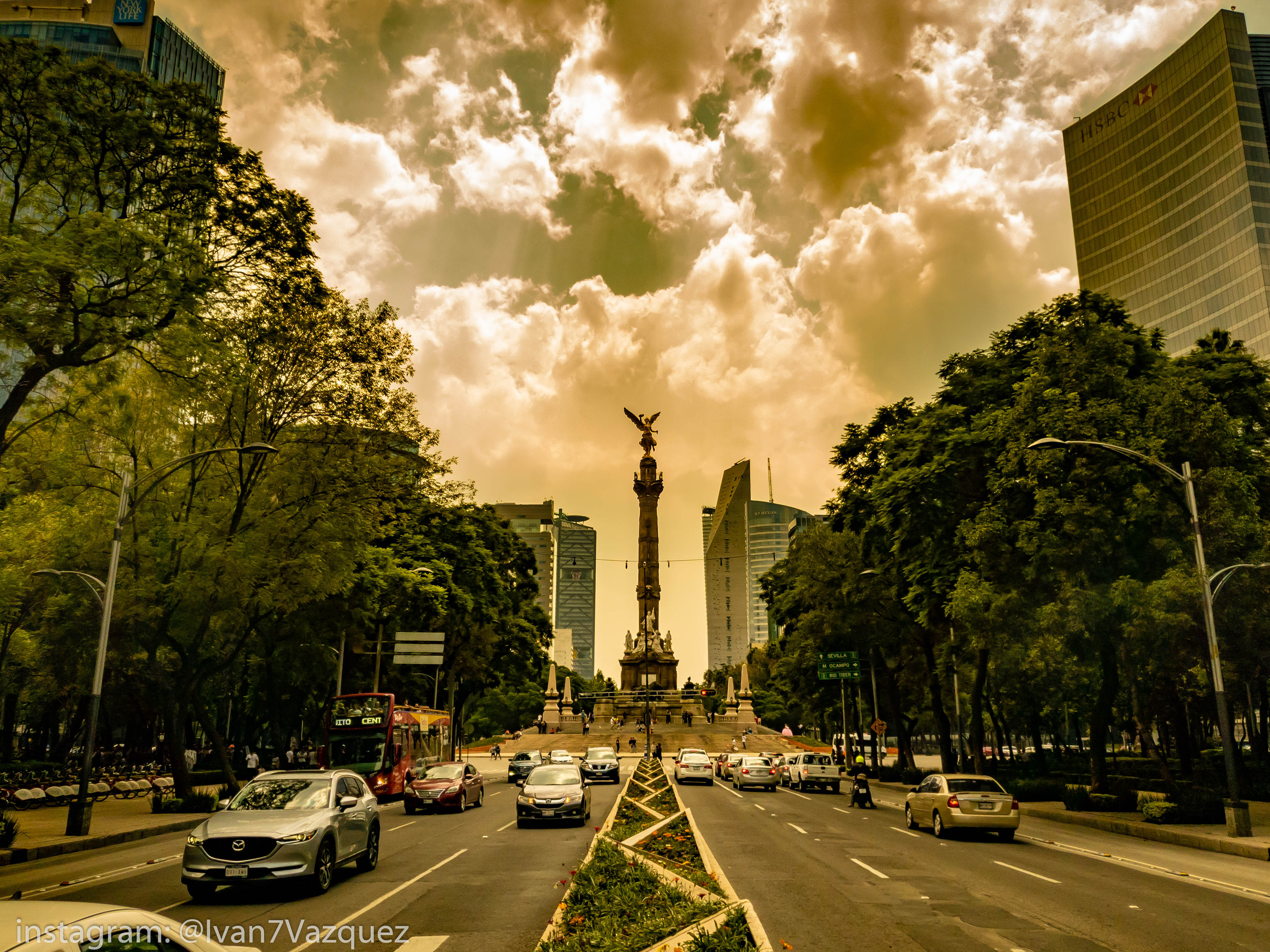
A normal picture of Angel of Independence in Mexico City (top), and a sepia picture of the same monument (bottom)

The use of yellow color filters for Mexico began with the film Traffic in 2000. To allow the audience to easily distinguish between the film's three storylines, Traffic's director and cinematographer Steven Soderbergh used various optical effects to give all three plots a distinctive visual style. The most notable of these was the Mexico storyline, where Soderbergh used tobacco filters to tint the image yellow. Soderbergh also reduced the shutter angle to 45 degrees to produce a sharp, strobing effect and exposed the entire film to Ektachrome film to increase the contrast and grain.

The release of Traffic coincided with technical advancements in film-making and film editing, allowing the easier use of color filters and color grading. Traditionally used to convey a sense of heat and aridity, the use of yellow color filters for Mexico eventually became a trope, with many films replicating Soderbergh's style.

It has been disputed that temperature is a good justification for using the Mexican filter given that hot cities in the United States are rarely depicted with yellow filters. In attempting to replicate the style of Traffic, the color grading is often used alongside increased contrast, which obscures the features of those with dark skin.

The style of color grading has been parodied online through memes, as well as criticized as a degrading stereotype of developing countries. Many online have referred to the trope as "shithole color grading".

== Use in movies and television ==
Notable examples of Mexican filter use include:

- Traffic (2000)
- Breaking Bad (2008–2013)
- Spectre (2015)
- Extraction (2020)
- The White Lotus (2021–2025): Seasons 1 and 3 set in Hawaii and Thailand had the filter, while season 2 set in Italy did not.
- Saw X (2023)

== Other usages ==
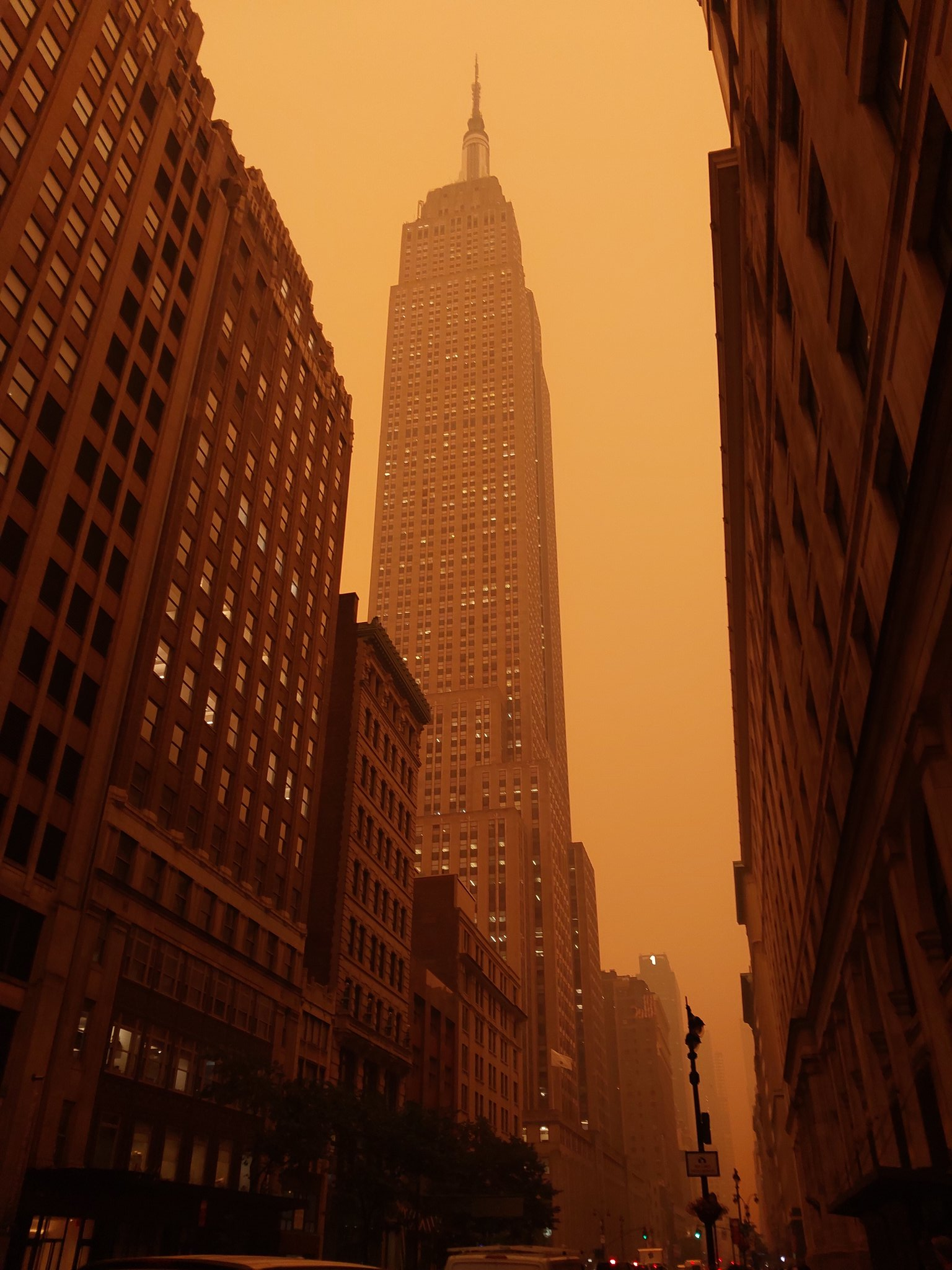
The Empire State Building seen on June 7, 2023. Many joked that the orange color caused by the smog was akin to the Mexican filter.

The term Mexican filter has been used online to describe the appearance of New York City during the 2023 Canadian wildfires, as the smog over the city appeared orange-yellow due to Rayleigh scattering.

== See also ==
- Photographic filter
- Color grading
- Color theory
