= Film recorder =

Device that copies content from a computer system to film stock

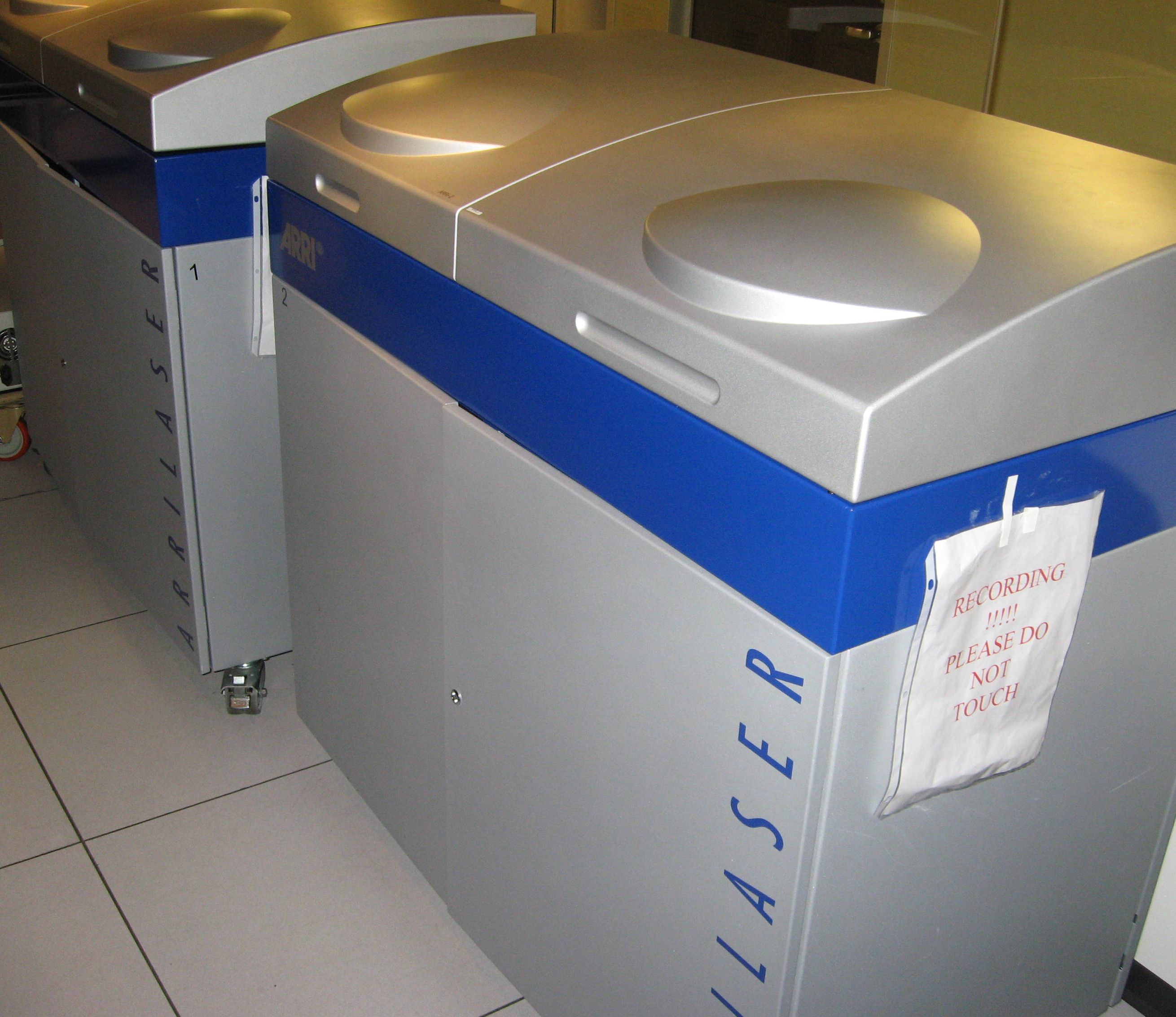
Pair of Arrilaser film recorders

A film recorder is a graphical output device for transferring images to photographic film from a digital source. In a typical film recorder, an image is passed from a host computer to a mechanism to expose film through a variety of methods, historically by direct photography of a high-resolution cathode-ray tube (CRT) display. The exposed film can then be developed using conventional developing techniques, and displayed with a slide or motion picture projector. The use of film recorders predates the current use of digital projectors, which eliminate the time and cost involved in the intermediate step of transferring computer images to film stock, instead directly displaying the image signal from a computer. Motion picture film scanners are the opposite of film recorders, copying content from film stock to a computer system. Film recorders can be thought of as modern versions of kinescopes.

== Design ==
=== Operation ===
All film recorders typically work in the same manner. The image is fed from a host computer as a raster stream over a digital interface. A film recorder exposes film through various mechanisms; flying spot (early recorders); photographing a high resolution video monitor; electron beam recorder (Sony HDVS); a CRT scanning dot (Celco); focused beam of light from a light valve technology (LVT) recorder; a scanning laser beam (Arrilaser); or recently, full-frame LCD array chips.

For color image recording on a CRT film recorder, the red, green, and blue channels are sequentially displayed on a single gray scale CRT, and exposed to the same piece of film as a multiple exposure through a filter of the appropriate color. This approach yields better resolution and color quality than possible with a tri-phosphor color CRT. The three filters are usually mounted on a motor-driven wheel. The filter wheel, as well as the camera's shutter, aperture, and film motion mechanism are usually controlled by the recorder's electronics and/or the driving software. CRT film recorders are further divided into analog and digital types. The analog film recorder uses the native video signal from the computer, while the digital type uses a separate display board in the computer to produce a digital signal for a display in the recorder. Digital CRT recorders provide a higher resolution at a higher cost compared to analog recorders due to the additional specialized hardware. Typical resolutions for digital recorders were quoted as 2K and 4K, referring to 2048×1366 and 4096×2732 pixels, respectively, while analog recorders provided a resolution of 640×428 pixels in comparison.

Higher-quality LVT film recorders use a focused beam of light to write the image directly onto a film loaded spinning drum, one pixel at a time. In one example, the light valve was a liquid-crystal shutter, the light beam was steered with a lens, and text was printed using a pre-cut optical mask. The LVT will record pixel beyond grain. Some machines can burn 120-res or 120 lines per millimeter. The LVT is basically a reverse drum scanner. The exposed film is developed and printed by regular photographic chemical processing.

=== Formats ===
Film recorders are available for a variety of film types and formats. The 35 mm negative film and transparencies are popular because they can be processed by any photo shop. Single-image 4×5 film and 8×10 are often used for high-quality, large format printing.

Some models have detachable film holders to handle multiple formats with the same camera or with Polaroid backs to provide on-site review of output before exposing film.

== Uses ==
Film recorders are used in digital printing to generate master negatives for offset and other bulk printing processes. For preview, archiving, and small-volume reproduction, film recorders have been rendered obsolete by modern printers that produce photographic-quality hardcopies directly on plain paper.

They are also used to produce the master copies of movies that use computer animation or other special effects based on digital image processing. However, most cinemas nowadays use Digital Cinema Packages on hard drives instead of film stock.

=== Computer graphics ===
Film recorders were among the earliest computer graphics output devices; for example, the IBM 740 CRT Recorder was announced in 1954.

Film recorders were also commonly used to produce slides for slide projectors; but this need is now largely met by video projectors that project images directly from a computer to a screen. The terms "slide" and "slide deck" are still commonly used in presentation programs.

=== Current uses ===
Currently, film recorders are primarily used in the motion picture film-out process for the ever increasing amount of digital intermediate work being done. Although significant advances in large venue video projection alleviates the need to output to film, there remains a deadlock between the motion picture studios and theater owners over who should pay for the cost of these very costly projection systems. This, combined with the increase in international and independent film production, will keep the demand for film recording steady for at least a decade.

== Key manufacturers ==
Traditional film recorder manufacturers have all but vanished from the scene or have evolved their product lines to cater to the motion picture industry. Dicomed was one such early provider of digital color film recorders. Polaroid, Management Graphics, Inc, MacDonald-Detwiler, Information International, Inc., and Agfa were other producers of film recorders. Arri is the only current major manufacturer of film recorders.

- Kodak Lightning I film recorder. One of the first laser recorders. Needed an engineering staff to set up.
- Kodak Lightning II film recorder used both gas and diode laser to record on to film.
- The last LVT machines produced by Kodak / Durst-Dice stopped production in 2002. There are no LVT film recorders currently being produced. LVT Saturn 1010 uses a LED exposure (RGB) to 8"x10" film at 1000-3000ppi.
- LUX Laser Cinema Recorder from Autologic/Information International in Thousand Oaks, California. Sales end in March 2000. Used on the 1997 film “Titanic”.
- Arri produces the Arrilaser line of laser-based motion picture film recorders.
- MGI produced the Solitaire line of CRT-based motion picture film recorders.
- Matrix, originally ImaPRO, a branch of Agfa Division, produced the QCR line of CRT-based motion picture film recorders.
- CCG, formerly Agfa film recorders, has been a steady manufacturer of film recorders based in Germany.
- In 2004 CCG introduced Definity, a motion picture film recorder utilizing LCD technology. In 2010 CCG introduced the first full LED LCD film recorder as a new step in film recording.
- Cinevator was made by Cinevation AS, in Drammen, Norway. The Cinevator was a real-time digital film recorder. It could record IN, IP and prints with and without sound
- Oxberry produced the Model 3100 film recorder camera system, with interchangeable pin-registered movements (shuttles) for 35 mm (full frame/Silent, 1.33:1) and 16 mm (regular 16, "2R"), and others have adapted the Oxberry movements for CinemaScope, 1.85:1, 1.75:1, 1.66:1, as well as Academy/Sound (1.37:1) in 35 mm and Super-16 in 16 mm ("1R"). For instance, the "Solitaire" and numerous others employed the Oxberry 3100 camera system.

== History ==
Before video tape recorders or VTRs were invented, TV shows were either broadcast live or recorded to film for later showing, using the kinescope process. In 1967, CBS Laboratories introduced the Electronic Video Recording format, which used video and telecined-to-video film sources, which were then recorded with an electron-beam recorder at CBS' EVR mastering plant at the time to 35mm film stock in a rank of 4 strips on the film, which was then slit down to 4 8.75 mm (0.344 in) film copies, for playback in an EVR player.

All types of CRT recorders were (and still are) used for film recording. Some early examples used for computer-output recording were the 1954 IBM 740 CRT Recorder, and the 1962 Stromberg-Carlson SC-4020, the latter using a Charactron CRT for text and vector graphic output to either 16 mm motion picture film, 16 mm microfilm, or hard-copy paper output.

Later 1970 and 80s-era recording to B&W (and color, with 3 separate exposures for red, green, and blue)) 16 mm film was done with an EBR (Electron Beam Recorder), the most prominent examples made by 3M), for both video and COM (Computer Output Microfilm) applications. Image Transform in Universal City, California used specially modified 3M EBR film recorders that could perform color film-out recording on 16 mm by exposing three 16 mm frames in a row (one red, one green and one blue). The film was then printed to color 16 mm or 35 mm film. The video fed to the recorder could either be NTSC, PAL or SECAM. Later, Image Transform used specially modified VTRs to record 24 frame for their "Image Vision" system. The modified 1 inch type B videotape VTRs would record and play back 24frame video at 10 MHz bandwidth, at about twice the normal NTSC resolution. Modified 24fps 10 MHz Bosch Fernseh KCK-40 cameras were used on the set. This was a custom pre-HDTV video system. Image Transform had modified other gear for this process. At its peak, this system was used in the production of the film "Monty Python Live at the Hollywood Bowl" in 1982. This was the first major pre-digital intermediate post production using a film recorder for film-out production.

In 1980 film recorder was made in LIKI in USSR.

In 1988, companies in the United States collectively produced 715 million slides at a cost of $8.3 billion.

=== Awards ===
The Academy of Motion Picture Arts and Sciences awarded an Oscar to the makers of the Arrilaser film recorder. The Award of Merit Oscar from the Academy Scientific and Technical Award ceremony was given on 11 February 2012 to Franz Kraus, Johannes Steurer and Wolfgang Riedel. Steurer was awarded the Oskar Messter Memorial Medal two years later in 2014 for his role in the development of the Arrilaser.

== See also ==
- Film-out
- Tape-out
- Grating light valve
