= Doremi Labs =

American digital cinema software company

Doremi Laboratories, Inc.
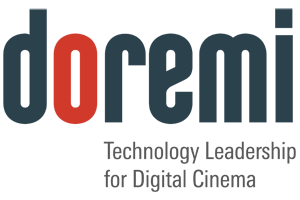
- Type: Incorporated
- Industry: Digital cinema
- Founded: 1985; October 31, 2014 (Acquired by Dolby Laboratories)
- Founder: Camille Rizko
- Headquarters: Burbank, California, United States
- Area served: Worldwide
- Key people: Emil Rizko; Safar Ghazal
- Products: Digital cinema servers Integrated media blocks 4K solutions Mastering products Converters
- Parent: Dolby Laboratories, Inc.
- Website: www.doremilabs.com at the Wayback Machine (archived February 5, 2015)

Doremi Laboratories, Inc., often shortened to Doremi Labs, was a developer and manufacturer of digital servers and format converters for the digital cinema, broadcast, post-production and professional A/V markets. It was established in 1985 in Burbank, California, United States, and was absorbed into Dolby Laboratories in a 2014 acquisition.

== History ==
Doremi Labs was founded by Camille Rizko in Los Angeles in 1985. Shortly after, he was joined by fellow engineers, Emil Rizko and Safar Ghazal. The first product, the Digital Audio Workstation Nucleus (DAWN), was an editing device for dialog replacement and effects/ADR Foley. The product used a Macintosh Plus computer as its user interface. One of the features that set Doremi's DAWN apart is its ability to play 8 high quality audio tracks from a single hard disk. The product built a faithful following owing to its friendly user interface which emulates existing paper based workflow.

In 1994, the company foresaw the need to replace VCRs used heavily in post-production studios, with a new tapeless model. Doremi decided that rather than change customer habits, it will design a tapeless disk recorder which will emulate as close as possible existing VCRs in use. The only major difference would be instant locate to any point within the recorded video clip. The V1 digital video recorder/player (DVR) was introduced to the public in 1996, and became an instant success. Doremi soon introduced models of the recorder that supports MPEG-2, Uncompressed, High Definition and JPEG2000. The success of the V1 led to Doremi's worldwide expansion, opening facilities in France and Japan.

During that same time period, to support its own internal need for a large number of high-quality, high-resolution displays, Doremi built the first HD-SDI to DVI converter, which allow users to have a low-cost high-definition monitoring system using computer displays. This innovative product was soon followed by a pattern generator. This product line was soon copied by several other manufacturers and created a whole new line of converter/generator products, which Doremi continues to pursue in the high end of the market.

In 2003, Doremi introduced the Nugget, a high quality high definition player for applications such as theme parks, museums, or anywhere where a high end HD player is needed. The product captured the high end portion of the playback market, and was adopted by major entertainment corporations as the product of choice for their loop playback applications.

In 2004, Doremi and Texas Instruments (TI), manufacturer of DLP digital micro-mirror imaging devices (DMDs), demonstrated cinema quality digital playback using TI's new 2K DMDs and a V1 DVR at IBC. Soon after, TI asked Doremi if they could build a server for the emerging digital cinema market. Doremi saw the opportunity and decided it was time to enter that market. Doremi started 2 simultaneous JPEG2000 compression based projects, one for a Digital Cinema Player called the DCP-2000, and the other for a Digital Mastering Station called the DMS-2000.

In April 2005, Doremi demonstrated for the first time to Disney Studios, a clip of National Treasure and a clip of Chicken Little, that were mastered on the DMS-2000 and played on the DCP-2000. The success of the experiment convinced the studio that the technology was now readily available to migrate movie playback from 35mm film to digital.

In June 2005, at CinemaExpo, Doremi showed for the first time a playback of a Digital Cinema Package (DCP). The package was prepared by the Digital Cinema Initiatives (DCI). Shortly after, Doremi looked to master a complete movie in digital. Universal Studios gave Doremi and Fotokem the authorization to master the upcoming movie Serenity in digital and have it ready by opening day. Doremi and Fotokem rose to the challenge despite many hurdles and showed the movie mastered on the DMS-2000, played on the DCP-2000 in September 2005, at Fotokem screening room. Shortly after, the movie was shown at the Entertainment Technology Center (ETC) on a 75-foot screen, to rave reviews.

During 2005, Christie-AIX, a joint venture between Christie Digital and Access IT (now Cinedigm), signed a Virtual Print Fee (VPF) contract with the studios to outfit 4,000 screens with digital playback systems. Following the Serenity demonstration, the Doremi server was selected for the rollout, and 150 screens were installed in 2005. The rollout continued with Doremi exclusively during 2006 and 2007.

In 2008, Doremi looked for other opportunities for products in the cinema market, and saw a need to design cost-effective hearing aid and viewing aid devices for the physically impaired. Doremi saw a moral obligation to innovate in this field and come up with products that the exhibitors would buy, not to avoid lawsuits, but to increase the captive audience. The Captiview hearing-impaired system was introduced in 2010, and the Fidelio viewing-impaired system was introduced in June 2011.

In 2009, Doremi introduced the first 4K integrated media block for TI's series-2 projectors, over 2 years ahead of its closest competitor. By 2010, the company launched CaptiView Display, which is a closed captioning device for cinema. It is fitted into the cup-holder of theater seats and taps into the Wi-Fi network to display encrypted closed captions.

In 2011, Doremi achieved DCI Compliance for IMB / ShowVault, DCP-2000, DCP-2K4 and receives 4K technology patent US 7,868,879 B2 relating to decoding technologies within the 4K standard. Additionally, all digital viewings at the 2011 Cannes Film Festival were delivered in 4K resolution with Doremi servers.

In 2012, Doremi achieved DCI Compliance for IMS1000.

On February 24, 2014, Dolby Laboratories announced that it signed an agreement to acquire Doremi Labs for $92.5 million in cash plus an additional $20 million in contingent consideration. The acquisition closed on October 31, 2014 and its completion was announced on November 3, 2014. While Doremi's corporate registration status is still active with the California Secretary of State office, its operations have been absorbed into Dolby, its branded products discontinued and its website and domain registration removed from the internet.

== Software ==
The software produced by Doremi Labs include:

- CineAsset, mastering software for creating encrypted and unencrypted DCI compliant packages
- CineExport, plug-in for Apple’s Compressor used to convert Final Cut Pro sequences and popular media formats to DCI compliant Digital Cinema Packages (DCPs)
- CinePlayer, media player used to review Digital Cinema Packages (DCPs) without the need for a digital cinema server
- TMS, Theatre management software
- Asset Manager, video file transfer software

== See also ==
- CineAsset
