= Inter-Society Digital Cinema Forum =

Industry forum concerned with theatrical digital cinema

- Abbreviation: ISDCF
- Formation: May 2006
- Type: Industry forum
- Interim chair: Pierre-Anthony Lemieux
- Parent organization: Inter-Society
- Website: www.isdcf.com

The Inter-Society Digital Cinema Forum (ISDCF) is an industry forum concerned with technical and deployment issues in digital cinema. It operates as a project of the Inter-Society.

ISDCF was established in May 2006 during the transition from film-based to digital theatrical distribution and exhibition. Its work covers the practical implementation of digital-cinema systems, including Digital Cinema Packages (DCPs), Key Delivery Messages (KDMs), distribution media, subtitles, captions, audio, security, 3D presentation and interoperability.

One of ISDCF's best-known contributions is the Digital Cinema Naming Convention (DCNC), a convention used to encode technical information about a DCP composition so that cinema personnel (i.e. projectionists) and digital-cinema systems can distinguish between different versions of a film.

== History ==
=== Formation ===
ISDCF was created in 2006 by the Inter-Society to address practical issues arising from the deployment of digital cinema. The European Digital Cinema Forum (EDCF), in its history of European digital-cinema development, describes the forum as having been created in Los Angeles in 2006 as a non-executive group representing studios, manufacturers and service providers. EDCF describes ISDCF's meetings as addressing practical problems associated with the creation, distribution and screening of digital movies.

The forum emerged as the cinema industry developed common technical practices for digital distribution and exhibition. Digital Cinema Initiatives (DCI) had established a technical architecture for compliant digital-cinema systems, while the SMPTE and other organizations were developing formal standards. ISDCF provided a forum for practical deployment questions that arose during implementation of these systems.

In March 2008, the Commission Supérieure Technique de l'Image et du Son (CST) reported on an ISDCF meeting held in Paris. The meeting included representatives of major studios, manufacturers, official organizations and users and addressed subjects including cinema-server software updates, the positioning of 3D subtitles, intermission markers, KDM distribution, equipment certificates and image contrast.

Jerry Pierce was the founding chairman of ISDCF and remained chair for 19 years. He had previously been involved in digital-cinema work at Universal Pictures, Digital Cinema Initiatives and SMPTE.

Pierce died on April 12, 2026. Pierre-Anthony Lemieux subsequently became interim chair of ISDCF.

=== International coordination ===
ISDCF developed a working relationship with EDCF. EDCF's history states that European participants regularly joined ISDCF meetings and conference calls to provide European input and to follow issues being discussed in the United States.

In October 2007, a joint declaration by France's CNC and Germany's FFA identified ISDCF, DCI, SMPTE and the ISO as organizations relevant to the development and deployment of digital-cinema standards. The declaration called for European technical stakeholders to work with those organizations so that European requirements would be taken into account.

The cooperation between ISDCF and EDCF continued in later technical work. SMPTE RDD 57:2021 identifies ISDCF and EDCF as the groups jointly responsible for creating the constraints document for the initial deployment profile of the Immersive Audio Bitstream (IAB) defined by SMPTE ST 2098-2.

== Activities ==
ISDCF holds regular technical meetings dealing with issues affecting digital-cinema content preparation, distribution and exhibition. Meetings currently take place approximately every six weeks and may be conducted remotely, in person or in hybrid form.

The forum's activities have included work involving DCPs, KDMs, facility and device lists, distribution media, security requirements, DCI specifications, projector and server upgrades, 3D luminance, subtitles, captions and SMPTE specifications relating to digital cinema and audio.

ISDCF's participation terms characterize its recommendations as voluntary and establish restrictions on discussions of competitively sensitive subjects such as prices, customers, territories and individual companies' business or strategic plans.

=== Interoperability testing ===
ISDCF has conducted interoperability tests involving DCP content and cinema equipment from different manufacturers. These tests have been used to examine differences in the implementation of digital-cinema specifications and to identify problems before new features are deployed widely.

In 2013, planned ISDCF plugfest testing covered subtitle rendering, 3D subtitles, marker flags in the Composition Playlist (CPL), high-frame-rate material and audio routing. The tests also examined the behavior of equipment with SMPTE-standardized subtitle and CPL features.

A 2012 ISDCF plugfest included tests of 3D projector- and server-rendered subtitles, Interop-DCP and SMPTE-DCP content, 48-frame-per-second 3D material and forensic image marking.

The transition from the earlier Interop-DCP format to SMPTE-DCP also required interoperability testing. ISDCF maintained test content and documentation for systems that had to ingest and present both formats during the transition.

=== 3D presentation and luminance ===
In March 2009, ISDCF conducted a demonstration at AMC Burbank 16 in Burbank, California, comparing digital 3D material that had been mastered for different luminance levels. The material was shown at several light levels in order to examine the visual and technical effects of brighter 3D presentation.

The demonstration was conducted as an industry demonstration rather than a formal standards test. Contemporary coverage noted that ISDCF was an industry forum rather than a formal standards body.

=== Security and key management ===
ISDCF has addressed practical aspects of digital-cinema security, including KDM delivery and the management of equipment information.

In 2009, ISDCF examined the Trusted Device List (TDL) process in response to requests from major film distributors. The discussions concerned information about digital-cinema equipment, security certificates and equipment locations and the practical mechanisms by which that information could be exchanged.

ISDCF also maintains technical documents concerning KDM formulation and other aspects of digital-cinema security and distribution.

=== Audio ===
ISDCF has addressed audio-channel assignments and interoperability among different digital-cinema audio systems.

In 2011, ISDCF adopted a 16-channel audio distribution format for Interop-DCP distribution, providing a method for carrying multichannel and accessibility-related audio in a common distribution format.

Subsequent interoperability testing examined audio routing and channel assignments in both Interop-DCP and SMPTE-DCP environments.

=== Subtitles, captions and accessibility ===
ISDCF has worked on technical issues involving subtitles, closed captions and accessibility content in digital cinema.

Early ISDCF meetings addressed the positioning of 3D subtitles and the implications of different subtitle implementations. In 2008, CST reported that 3D subtitles and server software updates were among the subjects discussed at an ISDCF meeting.

The forum has subsequently maintained technical documents concerning subtitles, closed captions and accessibility, including recommendations for closed-caption authoring and the encoding of sign-language video.

Sign-language video encoding was incorporated into the application profile documented by SMPTE RDD 52.

== Digital Cinema Naming Convention ==
The Digital Cinema Naming Convention (DCNC) is a naming convention maintained by ISDCF for digital-cinema compositions. It provides a structured way of encoding technical information about a particular version of a DCP in the composition's title metadata.

A single feature may be distributed in multiple DCP compositions that differ in language, subtitles, audio configuration, aspect ratio, accessibility features, dimensionality or other technical characteristics. The naming convention was created to make these distinctions visible to cinema personnel and to the digital-cinema systems that display composition titles.

The problem addressed by the convention arose partly from the limited display capacity of some early digital-cinema servers. Long composition titles could be truncated, making it difficult for operators to distinguish a feature from a trailer or to determine its language, image format or other characteristics. The convention therefore places abbreviated information in defined fields and in a consistent order.

An ISDCF naming-convention document from 2010 states that the convention was created by studios and the Inter-Society Digital Cinema Forum for the ContentTitleText element of a Composition Playlist. The document identifies studios, distributors, exhibitors, service entities and digital-cinema equipment manufacturers as users of the convention.

The convention divides the name into fields separated by underscores, while hyphens are used to separate sub-fields within some fields. Depending on the composition, the fields can identify such characteristics as content type, image format, language, territory, rating, audio configuration, resolution, studio, facility and package type.

ISDCF explicitly describes the DCNC as a convention rather than a standard. The convention is maintained as a living document, with modifications reviewed through ISDCF discussions.

The Entertainment Identifier Registry Association, responsible for EIDR, has independently described the DCNC as an ISDCF convention used to encode important feature metadata such as title, language and aspect ratio into DCP naming. EIDR has also distinguished the filename convention from structured metadata contained in the CPL, which provides a machine-readable mechanism for identifying content.

=== Relationship to CPL metadata ===
The DCNC was originally intended to make information visible on systems where only a limited number of characters of a composition title could be displayed.

ISDCF has increasingly supplemented the convention with structured Composition Playlist metadata. Its current documentation states that CPL metadata is being populated in distributed movies and contains more information than the naming convention while also being machine-readable.

The two systems continue to interact. SMPTE RDD 52:2020 lists version 9.6.1 of the ISDCF Digital Cinema Naming Convention among its normative references.

SMPTE RDD 57:2021 likewise lists the ISDCF Digital Cinema Naming Convention as a normative reference and specifies that the "Audio Type" field in ContentTitleText use the ISDCF-defined value "IAB" for an IAB DCP Profile 1 composition.

== Technical documentation and standards work ==
ISDCF maintains technical documents, registries and test material concerning digital-cinema workflows.

The documents cover DCP packaging, physical distribution media, KDMs, audio-channel assignments, digital-cinema language codes, subtitles, captions, accessibility, immersive audio and interoperability testing.

ISDCF's work has at times been incorporated into or used as input for formal SMPTE documents.

=== Distribution media and SMPTE ST 429-9 ===
ISDCF developed recommendations concerning the distribution of DCPs on physical media. These recommendations addressed the organization and formatting of storage devices used to transport DCPs to cinemas.

The revision history of ISDCF Doc3 records recommendations made in 2010 and 2013 concerning changes to SMPTE ST 429-9. The document states that SMPTE ST 429-9:2014 subsequently reflected those requested changes, including the introduction of Mapped File Sets and changes to the organization of files on distribution media.

ISDCF continued to maintain delivery recommendations based on SMPTE ST 429-9:2014, including guidance for content distributors, player manufacturers and theatre-management-system manufacturers.

=== SMPTE DCP Bv2.1 Application Profile ===
SMPTE RDD 52:2020 defines the "SMPTE DCP Bv2.1 Application Profile", a set of features and constraints for Digital Cinema Packages intended for theatrical distribution.

The introduction to RDD 52 states that the profile was integrated, globally agreed upon, tested and rolled out by industry experts, vendors, manufacturers, content owners and industry bodies including ISDCF and EDCF.

The document addresses packaging, picture and audio characteristics, timed text, Composition Playlist metadata, digital signatures, encryption and other elements of DCP implementation.

RDD 52 also includes an annex describing sign-language video encoding in a DCP.

=== Immersive audio ===
ISDCF and EDCF jointly developed the constraints for the first deployment profile of the Immersive Audio Bitstream (IAB) defined by SMPTE ST 2098-2.

SMPTE RDD 57:2021, titled "SMPTE ST 2098-2 Immersive Audio Bitstream and Packaging Constraints: IAB Application Profile 1", was approved on February 25, 2021.

The profile was created because the complete ST 2098-2 feature set was not supported by all immersive-audio renderers then deployed in cinemas. The profile defined a constrained set of supported features for initial industry deployment.

The RDD 57 documentation states that the profile was based on tests performed during an ISDCF plugfest held in February 2020 and on information supplied by equipment manufacturers.

== Test content and registries ==
ISDCF maintains test content for validating digital-cinema equipment and workflows, including framing charts, audio tests and other sample content.

The organization also maintains registries of terminology and identifiers used in digital-cinema workflows. Its terminology registry includes terms for DCPs, CPL metadata, equipment and presentation technologies.

The Digital Cinema Naming Convention registry provides definitions for the fields and terminology used in DCP naming.

== Organization ==
ISDCF operates as a project of the Inter-Society rather than as an independent standards organization.

Its membership includes participants from film studios, cinema exhibitors, systems integrators, equipment manufacturers, consultants and other parts of the cinema industry.

Meetings are open to members and guests in good standing. Meeting notes are made publicly available, and the forum maintains a public mailing list and calendar for information about its activities.

As of September 2026, ISDCF lists Pierre-Anthony Lemieux as interim chair.

== Relationship to standards organizations ==
ISDCF's role differs from that of formal standards organizations such as SMPTE.

Digital Cinema Initiatives established a technical specification and compliance framework for digital cinema, while SMPTE develops formal standards and Registered Disclosure Documents. ISDCF has primarily functioned as an industry forum for discussing practical deployment issues, conducting interoperability tests, developing recommendations and maintaining common terminology.

The distinction was explicit in contemporary reporting. Coverage of ISDCF's 2009 3D luminance demonstration described the activity as an industry demonstration rather than a formal standards test because ISDCF was not a standards body.

At the same time, ISDCF's recommendations and testing have contributed to the development and deployment of formal SMPTE documents. RDD 52 identifies ISDCF among the industry bodies involved in the development and rollout of the Bv2.1 DCP application profile, while RDD 57 identifies ISDCF and EDCF as the joint creators of the IAB constraints and states that the profile was based in part on testing conducted at an ISDCF plugfest.

== See also ==
- Digital cinema
- Digital Cinema Package
- Digital Cinema Initiatives
- Society of Motion Picture and Television Engineers
