= CineAsset =

Video mastering software suite

- CineAsset
- Developer(s): Doremi Labs, Dolby Labs
- Stable release: 8.3.7 / August 6, 2019; 5 years ago
- Operating system: Mac OS X Microsoft Windows; Linux
- Type: Video software
- License: Proprietary

CineAsset was a complete mastering software suite by Doremi Labs that could create and playback encrypted (Pro version) and unencrypted DCI compliant packages from virtually any source. CineAsset included a separate "Editor" application for generating Digital Cinema Packages (DCPs). CineAsset Pro added the ability to generate encrypted DCPs and Key Delivery Messages (KDMs) for any encrypted content in the database. It has since been discontinued, along with CineAsset Player.

== Features ==
Feature	Description
CineAsset DCP Editor	Convert popular video files to DCI compliant digital cinema packages (DCPs); Multi-reel support; Multiple Filters (Scale, XYZ Colorspace Conversion, Timecode Burn-in, Logo Overlay, Audio Delay, Trimmer); Create and playback DCPs with subtitles; Generate encrypted DCPs (Pro version only); Support for still picture import (create DCPs from a single image); Custom Luts and Matrix values for color conversion (.csv and .3dl files); High Frame Rate support (47.95, 48, 50, 59.94, 60, 72 and 96); Supplemental DCP support; Load/save project capability; Command line support; API Available; Support for Projector Certificates; KDM and Certificate Manager – database of KDMs and certificates creates an easy way to see properties make modifications to selected items; CineInspect DCP validation tool; Event Cinema support with H.264 encoding, MPEG2 encoding and VC1 wrapping; DCP import with DKDM support; Archive framerate support (16, 18.18, 20 and 21.82fps)
CineAsset Render Nodes (optional)	Increases processing speed by distributing JPEG2000 encoding across multiple computers on a network; Supports up to 5 render nodes per CineAsset
CineAsset Database	Build clip databases; Generate KDM's for encrypted content (Pro version only); Dropin folder for automated transfer of image sequences and other media files; Multimedia Export (Image Sequence, WAV, QuickTime, MPEG)
CinePlayer DCP Player	Real time XYZ to RGB color correction; Playback encrypted DCPs; Playback DCPs with subtitles; Playback other multimedia formats (MXF, MOV, etc.); VU meter; Adjustable playback framerate; CineInspect DCP validation tool; SDI output with third party I/O card
CineAsset Device Control	Device KDM manager allows management of KDMs on selected device; Convert, transfer, schedule and playback 2D or 3D video clips; Ingest content via Ethernet or FTP and automate file transfer to servers; Transport controls for the connected servers; Retrieve Media Block certificates
CineAsset Task View	Monitor and control tasks in the queue; View detailed information about processes and incomplete tasks
CineExport DCP Export Plug-in for Compressor	Compatible with Apple Compressor 3.5.3 and 4.0; Standard version without encryption and Pro version with encryption and KDM generation

== Supported formats ==
=== Input ===
==== Containers ====
- AVI
- MOV
- MXF
- MPG
- TS
- WMV
- M2TS
- MTS
- MP4
- MKV

==== Video Codecs ====
- JPEG2000
- ProRes 422
- DNxHD®
- YUV Uncompressed 8-10 bits
- DIVX®
- XVID®
- MPEG4
- AVC / H-264
- VC-1
- MPEG2

==== Image Sequences ====
- BMP
- TIFF
- TGA
- DPX
- JPG
- J2C

==== Audio Files ====
- WAV
- MP3
- WMA
- MP2

=== Output ===
==== JPEG2000 ====
- 2D and 3D at up to 4K resolution
- Bit Rate: 50–250 Mbit/s (500 Mbit/s for frame rates above 30 fps)
- Speed: Faster than real-time processing when using optional render nodes

==== MPEG2 ====
- I-Only or Long GOP
- 1080p up to 80 Mbit/s

==== H264 ====
- 1080p up to 50 Mbit/s

==== VC1 ====
- DCP wrapping only (no transcode)

== See also ==
- CineExport
- CinePlayer
- Non-linear video editing
- List of video editing software
- Comparison of video editing software
