= Media Block =

Component in a digital cinema projection system

A Media Block or Integrated Media Block (IMB) is a component in a digital cinema projection system. Its purpose is to convert the Digital Cinema Package (DCP) content into data that ultimately produces picture and sound in a theater in compliance with DCI anti-piracy encryption requirements.

== Terminology ==
DCI specification allows for two different security system architectures.

In the first the Media Block is outside of the projector. This design is simply referred to as a "Media Block" and is typically a device attached directly to the motherboard of a Digital Cinema server. The media block is usually connected to the projector by dual-link SDI cables. Such media block is limited to processing 2K output, downscaling 4K DCPs if necessary.

The second architecture describes an "Integrated Media Block". This refers to a device attached and integrated directly into the projector, which receives image data from the server, usually via a cat6 Ethernet connection. They can process 2K and 4K output.

Some hardware implementations integrate the entire server on a single board and are able to work both as a MB as well as an IMB.

== Security features ==
All security functions are contained within a Secure Processing Block (SPB), a tamper-proof physical device.

Upon ingestion into a DCP server, Key Delivery Messages (KDM) are stored on flash memory in the media block or IMB. A KDM is written to enable the playback of a specific DCP during a specific time window and on a specific media block or IMB, identified by its serial number during the authoring process. Media blocks and IMBs also contain a secure clock that is set in the factory cannot be altered by the end user, which the DCP servers to which they are attached use to determine showtimes. The secure clock prevents theaters from showing encrypted movies outside the times authorized by the KDM (e.g. after it has expired) by simply changing the date and time in the server's BIOS. Media blocks and IMBs also typically include anti-tamper devices, designed to self-destruct the unit if unauthorized modification of its hardware, software or secure clock is attempted.
