= CinePlayer =

Media player for Digital Cinema Package

- CinePlayer
- Developer: Doremi Labs
- Stable release: 6.4.5 / January 15, 2014; 12 years ago
- Operating system: Mac OS X Microsoft Windows; Linux
- Type: Video software
- License: Proprietary
- Website: CineExport: Product page

CinePlayer is a software based media player used to review Digital Cinema Packages (DCP) without the need for a digital cinema server by Doremi Labs. CinePlayer can play back any DCP, not just those created by Doremi Mastering products. In addition to playing DCPs, CinePlayer can also playback JPEG2000 image sequences and many popular multimedia file types.

There are two versions of CinePlayer available, standard and Pro. The standard version supports playback of non-encrypted, 2D DCP's up to 2K resolution. The Pro version supports playback of encrypted, 2D or 3D DCP's with subtitles up to 4K resolution.

== Supported formats ==
=== Containers ===
- AVI
- MOV
- MXF
- MPG
- TS
- WMV
- M2TS
- MTS
- MP4
- MKV

=== Video codecs ===
- JPEG2000
- ProRes 422
- DNxHD
- YUV Uncompressed 8-10 bits
- DIVX
- XVID
- MPEG4
- AVC / H-264
- VC-1
- MPEG2

=== Supported image sequences ===
- BMP
- TIFF
- TGA
- DPX
- JPG
- J2C

=== Supported audio files ===
- WAV
- MP3
- WMA
- MP2

== See also ==
- Doremi Labs
- CineAsset
- CineExport
- Comparison of DCP creation tools
- Non-linear video editing
- List of video editing software
- Comparison of video editing software
