= CineExport =

Plug-in for Apple Compressor

- CineExport
- Developer: Doremi Labs
- Stable release: 1.2.2 / January 15, 2014; 12 years ago
- Operating system: Mac OS X
- Type: Video software
- License: Proprietary
- Website: CineExport: Product page

CineExport is a plug-in for Apple Compressor used to convert Final Cut Pro sequences and popular media formats to DCI compliant Digital Cinema Packages (DCP) by Doremi Labs. Using the powerful CineAsset encoding engine, CineExport can be used to create JPEG2000 DCP's in the XYZ color space. MPEG-2 and H.264 encoded DCP's can also be created for alternative content and compatible players.

Standard and Pro versions are available allowing creation of 2D and 3D DCP's at up to 4K resolution. The Pro version allows the generation of encrypted DCP's along with KDM generation for encrypted content. DCP's created by CineExport are compatible with any standard digital cinema server.

== Features ==
- Easily convert popular video formats to DCP
- Easily convert Final Cut Pro sequences to DCP
- Compatible with all formats supported by Compressor 3.5.3 and 4.0
- Standard and Pro versions available
- XYZ Colorspace Conversion
- Adjust frame rate
- Uses Digital Cinema Naming Convention
- Stereoscopic support
- Custom Luts and Matrix values for color conversion (.csv and .3dl files)
- High Frame Rate support, up to 96 fps
- Adjust resolution (up to 4K supported)
- Create DCP's with subtitles
- Interop and SMPTE packaging formats supported
- Certificate Manager
- Generate encrypted DCP's (Pro version only)
- Generate KDM's for encrypted content (Pro version only)

== Supported Output Format ==
JPEG2000 Digital Cinema Package

- 2D and 3D at up to 4K resolution
- Bit Rate up to 250 Mbit/s (500 Mbit/s for frame rates above 30 fps)
- XYZ (YCxCz for 3D) Color Conversion

MPEG2 Digital Cinema Package

- I-Only or Long GOP
- 1080p up to 80 Mbit/s

H.264 Digital Cinema Package

- 1080p up to 50 Mbit/s

== See also ==
- CineAsset
- CinePlayer
- Non-linear video editing
- List of video editing software
