= Digital projection =

Digital projection may refer to:

- Digital cinema projectors, used in movie theatres for public exhibition
- Video projectors, generally used in home theatres and offices
