= Virtual Print Fee =

Subsidy paid by a film distributor

Virtual Print Fee (VPF) is a subsidy paid by a film distributor towards the purchase of digital cinema projection equipment for use by a film exhibitor in the presentation of first release motion pictures. The subsidy is paid in the form of a fee per booking of a movie, intended to match the savings that occurs by not shipping a film print.

The model is designed to help redistribute the savings realized by studios when using digital distribution instead of film print distribution and is intended to vanish when the transition phase is over when the vast majority of cinemas screens are equipped.

== History ==
The first public demonstration of digital projection for cinema took place at ShoWest in 1999, and it was readily apparent that the technology was further ahead than the business model. Early technology presentations attempted to claim that the technology would pay for itself through new revenues generated by new forms of content. But exhibitors knew their audience, and could see that digital projection was only a replacement technology, creating new financial liabilities, and not new revenue. It wasn’t until the rollout of digital 3-D years later in 2005 that digital projection demonstrated that it could be used to generate additional revenue.

The economics were challenging. Film projectors and platters cost in the neighborhood of US$30,000, while early digital projectors cost up to US$150,000. Further, film projectors had a lifetime of 30 years with relatively small annual expenditures in maintenance and replacement parts. On the other hand, exhibitors felt they would be lucky to get 10 years of service from a digital projector, after which there would have to be a refresh in capital expenditure. Meanwhile, distributors would realize significant savings by eliminating the high cost of film prints with corresponding shipping costs, and instead distributing digital files either by satellite or hard drive.

The Virtual Print Fee was designed to better balance savings and expenditures for both exhibitors and distributors. It is intended to primarily assist in the replacement of film projectors, and not assist in the purchase of new projection equipment for new construction. To give confidence to financial institutions that digital cinema technology was stable and worthy of investment, Digital Cinema Initiatives was created in 2002, resulting in the release of the first version of the DCI Digital Cinema System Specification in 2005. The DCI Specification continues to be the core specification for digital cinema, establishing the baseline technology and system requirements for which studios will release digital movies.

The first set of VPF agreements executed with four major studios were announced by Christie/AIX in November 2005. Christie/AIX at that time was a subsidiary of Access Integrated Technology, now renamed Cinedigm Digital Cinema Corp. The agreements were for the rollout of digital cinema technology to 4000 screens. Since that time, numerous other Digital Cinema Deployment Agreements have been executed around the world, allowing exhibitors in nearly every territory to benefit from VPF subsidies in the conversion from film projection to digital projection.
