= 2K resolution =

Display devices or content having horizontal resolution of approximately 2,000 pixels

This chart shows the most common display resolutions, with the color of each resolution type indicating the display ratio (e.g. red indicates a 4:3 ratio).

2K resolution is a generic term for display devices or content having a horizontal resolution of approximately 2,000 pixels. In the movie projection industry, Digital Cinema Initiatives is the dominant standard for 2K output and defines a 2K format with a resolution of 2048 × 1080. For television and consumer media, the dominant resolution in the same class is 1920 × 1080, but in the cinema industry this is generally referred to as HD and distinguished from the various 2K cinema formats.

== Resolutions ==
Examples of 2K resolutions
Format	Resolution	Display aspect ratio	Pixels
2K scan from 35 mm film (typical)	2048 × 1556	1.32:1 (512:389, ≈4:3)	3,186,688
DCI 2K (native resolution)	2048 × 1080	1.90:1 (256:135, ≈17:9)	2,211,840
DCI 2K (flat cropped)	1998 × 1080	1.85:1	2,157,840
DCI 2K (CinemaScope cropped)	2048 × 858	2.39:1	1,755,136
QXGA	2048 × 1536	1.33:1 (4:3)	3,145,728
WUXGA	1920 × 1200	1.60:1 (16:10)	2,304,000
Full HD	1920 × 1080	1.78:1 (16:9)	2,073,600
QWXGA	2048 × 1152	1.78:1 (16:9)	2,359,296

== Standards and terminology ==
In the cinematography industry, 2K resolution traditionally refers to a digital scan of 35 mm film with a resolution around 2000 pixels wide. Typically this is done at 2048 × 1556, but the exact dimensions vary based on the aspect ratio and size of the scan area.

In modern cinema, another common 2K resolution is 2048 × 1080. This is the resolution of the 2K container format standardized by DCI in their Digital Cinema System Specification in 2005. The resolution of the encapsulated video content follows the SMPTE 428-1 standard, which establishes the following resolutions for a 2K distribution:

- 2048 × 1080 (full frame, 256∶135 or ≈1.90∶1 aspect ratio)
- 1998 × 1080 (flat crop, 1.85∶1 aspect ratio)
- 2048 × 858 (CinemaScope crop, ≈2.39∶1 aspect ratio)

However, the term 2K itself is generic, was not coined by DCI, and does not refer specifically to the DCI 2K standard. Usage of the term 2K predates the publication of the DCI standard. The resolution 1920 × 1080 has also been referred to as a 2K resolution by other standards organizations like NHK Science & Technology Research Laboratories and ITU Radiocommunication Sector (which were involved in the standardization of 1080p HDTV and 4K UHDTV). In consumer products, 2560 × 1440 (1440p) is sometimes referred to as 2K, but it and similar formats are more traditionally categorized as 2.5K resolutions.

== See also ==
- 21:9 aspect ratio
