= Digital Cinema Package =

Format used to deliver movies to cinemas

A Digital Cinema Package (DCP) is a collection of digital files used to store and convey digital cinema (DC) audio, image, and data streams.

The term was popularized by Digital Cinema Initiatives, LLC in its original recommendation for packaging DC contents. However, the industry tends to apply the term to the structure more formally known as the composition. A Digital Cinema Package is a container format for compositions, a hierarchical file structure that represents a title version. The Digital Cinema Package may carry a partial composition (e.g. not a complete set of files), a single complete composition, or multiple and complete compositions.

The composition consists of a Composition Playlist (in XML format) that defines the playback sequence of a set of Track Files. Track Files carry the essence (audio, image, subtitles), which is wrapped using Material eXchange Format (MXF). Track Files must contain only one essence type.

Two track files at a minimum must be present in every composition, a track file carrying picture essence, and a track file carrying audio essence. The composition, consisting of a Composition Playlist (CPL) and associated track files, are distributed as a Digital Cinema Package (DCP). A composition is a complete representation of a title version, while the DCP need not carry a full composition. However, as already noted, it is commonplace in the industry to discuss the title in terms of a DCP, as that is the deliverable to the cinema.

The Picture Track File essence is compressed using JPEG 2000 and the Audio Track File carries a 24-bit linear PCM uncompressed multichannel WAV file. Encryption may optionally be applied to the essence of a track file to protect it from unauthorized use. The encryption used is AES 128-bit in CBC mode.

In practice, there are two versions of composition in use. The original version is called Interop DCP. In 2009, a specification was published by SMPTE (SMPTE ST 429-2 Digital Cinema Packaging – DCP Constraints) for what is commonly referred to as SMPTE DCP. SMPTE DCP is similar but not backwards compatible with Interop DCP, resulting in an uphill effort to transition the industry from Interop DCP to SMPTE DCP. SMPTE DCP requires significant constraints to ensure success in the field, as shown by ISDCF. While legacy support for Interop DCP is necessary for commercial products, new productions are encouraged to be distributed in SMPTE DCP.

== Technical specifications ==
The DCP root folder (in the storage medium) contains a number of files, some used to store the image and audio contents, and some other used to organize and manage the whole playlist.

=== Picture MXF files ===
Picture contents may be stored in one or more reels corresponding to one or more MXF files. Each reel contains pictures as MPEG-2 or JPEG 2000 essence, depending on the adopted codec. MPEG-2 is no longer compliant with the DCI specification. JPEG 2000 is the only accepted compression format.

- Supported frame rates are:
  - SMPTE (JPEG 2000)
    - 24, 25, 30, 48, 50, and 60 fps @ 2K
    - 24, 25, and 30 fps @ 4K
    - 24 and 48 fps @ 2K stereoscopic
  - MXF Interop (JPEG 2000) – Deprecated
    - 24 and 48 fps @ 2K (MXF Interop can be encoded at 25 frame/s but support is not guaranteed)
    - 24 fps @ 4K
    - 24 fps @ 2K stereoscopic
  - MXF Interop (MPEG-2) – Deprecated
    - 23.976 and 24 fps @ 1920 × 1080
- Maximum frame sizes are 2048 × 1080 for 2K DC, and 4096 × 2160 for 4K DC. Common formats are:
  - SMPTE (JPEG 2000)
    - Flat (1998 × 1080 or 3996 × 2160), = 1.85:1 aspect ratio
    - Scope (2048 × 858 or 4096 × 1716), = 2.39:1 aspect ratio
    - HDTV (1920 × 1080 or 3840 × 2160), 16:9 aspect ratio (~1.78:1) (although not specifically defined in the DCI specification, this resolution is DCI compliant per section 8.4.3.2).
    - Full (2048 × 1080 or 4096 × 2160) (~1.9:1 aspect ratio, official name by DCI is Full Container. Not widely accepted in cinemas.)
  - MXF Interop (MPEG-2) – Deprecated
    - Full Frame (1920 × 1080)
- 12 bits per component precision (36 bits total per pixel)
- XYZ' colorspace; the prime mark indicates gamma encoding (gamma=2.6)
- Maximum bit rate is 250 Mbit/s (1.3 MBytes per frame at 24 frame per second)

=== Sound MXF files ===
Sound contents are also stored in reels corresponding to picture reels in number and duration. In case of multilingual features, separate reels are required to convey different languages. Each file contains linear PCM essence.

- Sampling rate is 48,000 or 96,000 samples per second
- Sample precision of 24 bits
- Linear mapping (no companding)
- Up to 16 independent channels

=== Asset map file ===
List of all files included in the DCP, in XML format.

=== Composition playlist file ===
Defines the playback order during presentation. The order is saved in XML format in this file; each picture and sound reel is identified by its UUID. In the following example, a reel is composed by picture and sound:

<Reel>
  <Id>urn:uuid:632437bc-73f9-49ca-b687-fdb3f98f430c</Id>
  <AssetList>
    <MainPicture>
      <Id>urn:uuid:46afe8a3-50be-4986-b9c8-34f4ba69572f</Id>
      <EditRate>24 1</EditRate>
      <IntrinsicDuration>340</IntrinsicDuration>
      <EntryPoint>0</EntryPoint>
      <Duration>340</Duration>
      <FrameRate>24 1</FrameRate>
      <ScreenAspectRatio>2048 858</ScreenAspectRatio>
    </MainPicture>
    <MainSound>
      <Id>urn:uuid:1fce0915-f8c7-48a7-b023-36e204a66ed1</Id>
      <EditRate>24 1</EditRate>
      <IntrinsicDuration>340</IntrinsicDuration>
      <EntryPoint>0</EntryPoint>
      <Duration>340</Duration>
    </MainSound>
  </AssetList>
</Reel>

=== Packing list file or package key list (PKL) ===
All files in the composition are hashed and their hash is stored here, in XML format. This file is generally used during ingestion in a digital cinema server to verify if data have been corrupted or tampered with in some way. For example, an MXF picture reel is identified by the following <asset> element:

<Asset>
  <Id>urn:uuid:46afe8a3-50be-4986-b9c8-34f4ba69572f</Id>
  <Hash>iqZ3X7TdAjAqniOxT2/hj66VCUU=</Hash>
  <Size>210598692</Size>
  <Type>application/x-smpte-mxf;asdcpKind=Picture</Type>
</Asset>

The hash value is the Base64 encoding of the SHA-1 checksum. It can be calculated with the command:

openssl sha1 -binary "FILE_NAME" | openssl base64

=== Volume index file ===
A single DCP may be stored in more than one medium (e.g., multiple hard disks). The XML file VOLINDEX is used to identify the volume order in the series.

== 3D DCP ==
The DCP format is also used to store stereoscopic (3D) contents for 3D films. In this case, 48 frames exist for every second – 24 frames for the left eye, 24 frames for the right.

Depending on the projection system used, the left eye and right eye pictures are either shown alternately (double or triple flash systems) at 48 fps or, on 4k systems, both left and right eye pictures are shown simultaneously, one above the other, at 24 fps. In triple flash systems, active shutter glasses are required whereas optical filtering such as circular polarisation is used in conjunction with passive glasses on polarized systems.

Since the maximum bit rate is always 250 Mbit/s, this results in a net 125 Mbit/s for single frame, but the visual quality decrease is generally unnoticeable.

== D-Box ==
D-Box codes for motion controlled seating (labelled as "Motion Data" in the DCP specification), if present, are stored as a monoaural WAV file on Sound Track channel 13. Motion Data tracks are unencrypted and not watermarked.

== Creation ==
Most film producers and distributors rely on digital cinema encoding facilities to produce and quality control check a digital cinema package before release. Facilities follow strict guidelines set out in the DCI recommendations to ensure compatibility with all digital cinema equipment. For bigger studio release films, the facility will usually create a Digital Cinema Distribution Master (DCDM).

A DCDM is the post-production step prior to a DCP. The frames are in XYZ TIFF format and both sound and picture are not yet wrapped into MXF files. A DCP can be encoded directly from a DCDM. A DCDM is useful for archiving purposes and also facilities can share them for international re-versioning purposes. They can easily be turned into alternative version DCPs for foreign territories. For smaller release films, the facility will usually skip the creation of a DCDM and instead encode directly from the Digital Source Master (DSM) the original film supplied to the encoding facility. A DSM can be supplied in a multitude of formats and color spaces. For this reason, the encoding facility needs to have extensive knowledge in color space handling including, on occasion, the use of 3D LUTs to carefully match the look of the finished DCP to a celluloid film print. This can be a highly involved process in which the DCP and the film print are "butterflied" (shown side by side) in a highly calibrated cinema.

Less demanding DCPs are encoded from tape formats such as HDCAM SR. Quality control checks are always performed in calibrated cinemas and carefully checked for errors. QC checks are often attended by colorists, directors, sound mixers and other personnel to check for correct picture and sound reproduction in the finished DCP.

== Accessibility ==
=== Hearing impaired audio ===
A Hearing Impaired (HI) audio track is designed for people who are hearing-impaired to better hear dialog. Moviegoers can wear headphones which play this audio track synchronized with the film. Hearing Impaired audio is stored in the DCP on Sound Track channel 7.

=== Audio description ===
Audio description is narration for people who are blind or visually impaired. Audio description is stored in the DCP as "Visually Impaired-Native" (VI-N) audio on Sound Track channel 8.

=== Sign Language Video ===
A Sign Language Video track can be included in a DCP to allow for display of sign language synchronized with the film. Sign Language Video tracks are displayed to moviegoers in portrait orientation on a second screen device. In September 2017, new Libras accessibility requirements took effect in Brazil mandating availability of Brazilian Sign Language for films shown in Brazilian movie theaters.

Sign Language Video tracks have no audible audio and are encoded in VP9 format with a maximum bit rate of 1 Mbps, in 480x640px resolution, and with a frame rate of 24 frames per second (even if the main film is a different frame rate).

VP9 video is stored in Sound Track channel 15, identified by an MCA (Multichannel Audio) Tag Name of "Sign Language Video Stream". VP9-compressed video is stored in an uncompressed PCM audio channel with a 48 kHz sample rate and a 24-bit bitrate, occupying a fixed bandwidth of 1.152 Mbps. Since VP9 uses a variable bitrate, video is stored in evenly-distributed 2-second chunks, decoded by the media block. This method retains random access playback ability ("trick play") and is compatible with all existing digital cinema projection systems. Sign Language Video tracks are unencrypted and not watermarked.

The InterSociety Digital Cinema Forum (ISDCF) released an open-source encoder and decoder for Sign Language Video on GitHub.

== Encryption ==
The distributor can choose to encrypt the media (MXF) files with AES encryption to stop unauthorised access. The symmetric AES keys used to encrypt the content essence must be carefully protected, so they are never distributed directly. Instead the AES keys are themselves encrypted using asymmetric 2048 bit RSA. Each playback system has its own unique public/private key pair. The private key is never shared and is buried in the playback systems within secure hardware meeting FIPS-140 security standards. The matching public key is shared with the distributor, who can then create Key Delivery Messages (KDMs) which control access to the encrypted content for each playback system. KDMs are XML files containing the RSA-encrypted AES keys that can be decrypted only by the private key within the destination device. A KDM is associated to the particular compositions (CPLs) which may include multiple encrypted picture, sound and subtitle assets, and each playback system requires a uniquely generated KDM. KDMs also provide the ability to define date/time windows within which the KDM is valid. Playback systems will not allow playback outside of this validity window, allowing distributors to ensure that content cannot be unlocked prior to release date and to enforce the rental agreement period agreed with the exhibitor.

Encryption of subtitles is primarily designed for protection during transport; subtitle content may be transmitted in plaintext to a projection unit.

== Watermarking ==
Forensic Marking (FM) refers to tracking information embedded via digital watermarking to the image ("Image Forensic Marking") and audio ("Audio Forensic Mark") channels via an embedder in the Media Block. This technology is similar to coded anti-piracy used for celluloid film. Watermarking does not stop unauthorized recordings or their distribution, though it may deter unauthorized copying by those aware of the watermarking process. Watermarks are designed to be detectable in any copies, including unauthorized recordings (such as cams). Information obtained from watermarks in unauthorized copies, along with logs generated by Media Blocks, can be examined as part of an investigation to identify the source of the recordings, called traitor tracing. Up to 30 minutes of a recording may be required to positively identify the watermark. The DCI specification does not mandate a specific watermarking technology, and there are multiple such systems available. A watermark is generated in real time (or faster) and is inserted every 5 minutes. The watermark includes a time stamp and a unique ID associated with the Secure Processing Block (SPB). Image and audio watermarking is required to be transparent to humans as well as to survive any tampering or format conversions, including multiple conversions between analog and digital formats, pitch shifting, scaling, or cropping.

Watermarking must be applied to all encrypted channels (audio or image) and must not be applied to unencrypted channels. Watermarking can be disabled for all channels ("no FM mark") or specific audio tracks only ("selective audio FM mark") via setting the associated value in the ForensicMarkFlagList element of the KDM. In the case of specific unwatermarked audio tracks, all tracks numbered above the specified track number will have FM disabled. D-Box and Sign Language Video tracks must have FM disabled.

== Delivery methods ==
The most common method uses a specialist hard disk (most commonly the CRU DX115) designed specifically for digital cinema servers to ingest from. These hard drives were originally designed for military use but have since been adopted by digital cinema for their hard wearing and reliable characteristics. The hard disk drives are usually formatted with the Linux ext2 or ext3 file system as D-Cinema servers are typically Linux-based and are required to have read support for these file systems. Usually the inode size is set to 128 bytes to avoid compatibility issues with some servers. NTFS and FAT32 are also occasionally used. Hard drive units are normally hired from a digital cinema encoding company, sometimes in quantities of thousands. Drives are commonly shipped in protective hard cases. The drives are delivered via express courier to the exhibition site. Other methods adopt a full digital delivery, using either dedicated satellite links or high-speed Internet connections.

For example, theaters received Cats before opening day, Friday 20 December 2019. When the film received poor reviews after its world premiere on 16 December, Universal notified theaters on 20 December that an updated version of the film with "some improved visual effects" would be available for download on 22 December and on hard drive by 24 December.
