= Digital Cinema Initiatives =

Consortium of major motion picture studios

Digital Cinema Initiatives, LLC
- Type: Limited liability company
- Industry: Mass media
- Genre: Digital cinema
- Founded: March 2002; 24 years ago
- Headquarters: California
- Website: www.dcimovies.com

Digital Cinema Initiatives, LLC (DCI) is a consortium of major motion picture studios, formed to establish specifications for a common systems architecture for digital cinema systems.

The organization was formed in March 2002 by Metro-Goldwyn-Mayer, (Note: Metro-Goldwyn-Mayer withdrew as a member of DCI in May 2005, prior to the release of the DCI Specification.) Paramount Pictures, Sony Pictures, 20th Century Studios, (Note: 20th Century Studios withdrew as a member of DCI in March 2019, as a consequence of its merger with The Walt Disney Company.) Universal Studios, Walt Disney Studios and Warner Bros. Entertainment.

The primary purpose of DCI is to establish and document specifications for an open architecture for digital cinema that ensures a uniform and high level of technical performance, reliability and quality. By establishing a common set of content requirements, distributors, studios, exhibitors, d-cinema manufacturers and vendors can be assured of interoperability and compatibility. Because of the relationship of DCI to many of Hollywood's key studios, conformance to DCI's specifications is considered a requirement by software developers or equipment manufacturers targeting the digital cinema market.

== Specification ==
On July 20, 2005, DCI released Version 1.0 of its "Digital Cinema System Specification", commonly referred to as the "DCI Specification". The document describes overall system requirements and specifications for digital cinema. Between March 28, 2006, and March 21, 2007, DCI issued 148 errata to Version 1.0.

DCI released Version 1.1 of the DCI Specification on April 12, 2007, incorporating the previous 148 errata into the DCI Specification. On April 15, 2007, at the annual NAB Digital Cinema Summit, DCI announced the new version, as well as some future plans. They released the "Stereoscopic Digital Cinema Addendum" to begin to establish 3-D technical specifications in response to the popularity of 3-D stereoscopic films. It was also announced "which studios would take over the leadership roles in DCI after the current leadership term expires at the end of September."

Subsequently, between August 27, 2007, and February 1, 2008, DCI issued 100 errata to Version 1.1. So, DCI released Version 1.2 of the DCI Specification on March 7, 2008, again incorporating the previous 100 errata into the specification document. An additional 96 errata were issued by August 30, 2012, so a revised Version 1.2 incorporating those additional errata was approved on October 10, 2012. DCI approved DCI Specification Version 1.3 on June 27, 2018, integrating the 45 errata issued to the previous version into a new document.

On July 20, 2020, fifteen years to the day after Version 1.0, DCI issued a new DCI Specification Version 1.4 that assimilated 29 errata issued since Version 1.3. On October 13, 2021, DCI approved a new DCI Specification Version 1.4.1 that integrated the 23 errata that had been issued to DCI Specification Version 1.4. For the convenience of users, DCI also created an online HTML version of DCI Specification, Version 1.4.1. Due to the HTML conversion process, the footnotes in the DCSS now appear as endnotes. The PDF version contains pagination and page numbers whereas the HTML version does not.

DCI Specification Version 1.4.2, dated June 15, 2022, includes revisions and refinements respecting Object-Based Audio Essence (OBAE), also known as Immersive Audio Bitstream (IAB). Version 1.4.2 also implements post-show log record collection utilizing SMPTE 430-17 SMS-OMB Communications Protocol Specification. Additionally, Version 1.4.2 incorporated two prior addenda: the Digital Cinema Object-Based Audio Addendum, dated October 1, 2018 and the Stereoscopic Digital Cinema Addendum, Version 1.0, dated July 11, 2007. Users using Version 1.4.2 no longer need to refer to the separate addenda. Previous DCSS versions are archived on the DCI web site.

Based on many SMPTE and ISO standards, such as JPEG 2000-compressed image and "broadcast wave" PCM/WAV sound, the DCI Specification explains the route to create an entire Digital Cinema Package (DCP) from a raw collection of files known as the Digital Cinema Distribution Master (DCDM), as well as the specifics of its content protection, encryption, and forensic marking.

The DCI Specification also establishes standards for the decoder requirements and the presentation environment itself, such as ambient light levels, pixel aspect and shape, image luminance, white point chromaticity, and those tolerances to be kept.

Even though it specifies what kind of information is required, the DCI Specification does not include specific information about how data within a distribution package is to be formatted. Formatting of this information is defined by the Society of Motion Picture and Television Engineers (SMPTE) digital cinema standards and related documents. (Note: As of 1 January 2023, the following sixty-two SMPTE engineering guidelines, recommended practices, registered disclosure documents and standards had been adopted and published: • EG 1008:2022 Digital Cinema – Overview for the SMPTE 428, 429, 430, 431, 432, and 433 Document Suites • ST 427:2009 Link Encryption for 1.5 Gb/s Serial Digital Interface • ST 428-1:2019 Image Characteristics • ST 428-2:2006 Audio Characteristics • ST 428-3:2006 Audio Channel Mapping and Channel Labeling [withdrawn] • RP 428-4:2010 Audio File Formats and Delivery Constraints • RP 428-5:2010 Mapping of Images into Constrained Tag Image File • RP 428-6:2009 Digital Leader • ST 428-7:2014 Subtitle • ST 428-9:2008 Serial Digital Interface Signal Formatting • ST 428-10:2008 Closed Caption and Closed Subtitle • ST 428-11:2013 Additional Frame rates for D-Cinema • ST 428-12:2013 Common Audio Channels and Soundfield Groups • ST 428-19:2010 Additional Frame Rates Level AFR2 and Level AFR4 — Serial Digital Interface Signal Formatting • ST 428-21:2011 Archive Frame Rates for D-Cinema • ST 429-2:2020 DCP Operational Constraints • ST 429-3:2007 Sound and Picture Track File • ST 429-4:2020 MXF JPEG2000 Application • ST 429-5:2017 Timed Text Track File • ST 429-6:2006 MXF Track File Essence Encryption • ST 429-7:2006 Composition Playlist • ST 429-8:2007 Packing List • ST 429-9:2014 Asset Mapping and File Segmentation • ST 429-10:2008 Stereoscopic Picture Track File • ST 429-12:2008 Caption and Closed Subtitles • ST 429-13:2009 DCP Operational Constraints for Additional Frame Rates • ST 429-14:2014 Aux Data Track File • ST 429-16:2014 Additional Composition Metadata and Guidelines • ST 429-17:2017 XML Constraints • ST 429-18:2019 Immersive Audio Track File • ST 429-19:2019 DCP Operational Constraints for Immersive Audio • ST 430-1:2017 Key Delivery Message • ST 430-1:2017 Am1:2019 Key Delivery Message - Amendment 1 • ST 430-2:2017 Digital Certificate • ST 430-3:2012 Generic Extra-Theater Message Format • ST 430-4:2008 Log Record Specification • ST 430-4:2008 Am1:2011 Log Record Specification - Amendment 1 • ST 430-5:2011 Security Log Event Class and Constraints • ST 430-6:2010 Auditorium Security Messages for Intra-Theater Communications • ST 430-7:2008 Facility List Message [withdrawn] • ST 430-7:2008 Am1:2001 Facility List Message – Amendment 1 [withdrawn] • ST 430-9:2008 Key Delivery Bundle • ST 430-9:2008 Am1:2011 Key Delivery Bundle – Amendment 1 • ST 430-10:2010 Auxiliary Content Synchronisation Protocol • ST 430-11:2011 Auxiliary Resource Presentation List • ST 430-12:2014 FSK Synchronization Protocol • ST 430-12:2014 Am1:2019 FSK Synchronization Protocol – Amendment 1 • ST 430-14:2022 Digital Sync and Aux Data Transfer Protocol • ST 430-15:2017 Facility List Message Exchange Protocol • ST 430-16:2017 Extended Facility List Message • ST 430-17:2022 SMS-OMB Communications Protocol Specification • ST 431-1:2006 Screen Luminance Level, Chromaticity and Uniformity • RP 431-2:2011 Reference Projector and Environment • EG 432-1:2010 Color Processing for D-Cinema • EG 432-2:2006 D-Cinema Low Frequency Effects (LFE) Channel Audio Characteristics • ST 433:2008 XML Data Types • ST 433:2008 Am1:2011 XML Data Types – Amendment 1 • RDD 20:2010 Cinelink 2 Specification • RDD 28:2014 Dolby Atmos® Print Master File Specification • RDD 29:2019 Dolby Atmos® Bitstream Specification • RDD 52:2020 SMPTE DCP Bv2.1 Application Profile • RDD 57:2021 IAB Application Profile 1)

== Image and audio capability overview ==
=== 2D image ===
Comparison of 4K DCI resolutions and 16:9

- 2048×1080 (2K) at 24 frame/s or 48 frame/s, or 4096×2160 (4K) at 24 frame/s
  - In 2K, for Scope (2.39:1) presentation 2048×858 pixels of the imager is used
  - In 2K, for Flat (1.85:1) presentation 1998×1080 pixels of the imager is used
  - In 4K, for Scope (2.39:1) presentation 4096×1716 pixels of the imager is used
  - In 4K, for Flat (1.85:1) presentation 3996×2160 pixels of the imager is used
- 12 bits per color component (36 bits per pixel) via dual HD-SDI (encrypted)
  - 10 bits only permitted for 2K at 48 frame/s
- CIE XYZ color space, gamma-corrected
- TIFF 6.0 container format (one file per frame)
- JPEG 2000 compression
  - From 0 to 5 or from 1 to 6 wavelet decomposition levels for 2K or 4K resolutions, respectively
  - Compression rate of 4.71 bits/pixel (2K @ 24 frame/s), 2.35 bits/pixel (2K @ 48 frame/s), 1.17 bits/pixel (4K @ 24 frame/s)
- 250 Mbit/s maximum image bit rate

=== Stereoscopic 3D image ===
- 2048×1080 (2K) at 48 frame/s - 24 frame/s per eye (4096×2160 4K not supported)
  - In 2K, for Scope (2.39:1) presentation 2048×858 pixels of the imager is used
  - In 2K, for Flat (1.85:1) presentation 1998×1080 pixels of the imager is used
  - Optionally, in the HD-SDI link only: 12 bit color, YCxCz 4:2:2 (i.e. chroma subsampling in XYZ space), each eye in separate stream

=== Audio ===
- 24 bits per sample, 48 kHz or 96 kHz
- Up to 16 channels
- WAV container, uncompressed PCM

DCI has additionally published a document outlining recommended practice for High Frame Rate digital cinema. This document discloses the following proposed frame rates: 60, 96, and 120 frames per second for 2D at 2K resolution; 48 and 60 for stereoscopic 3D at 2K resolution; 48 and 60 for 2D at 4K resolution. The maximum compressed bit rate for support of all proposed frame rates should be 500 Mbit/s.

== Related information ==
The idea for DCI was originally mooted in late 1999 by Tom McGrath, then COO of Paramount Pictures, who applied to the U.S. Department of Justice for anti-trust waivers to allow the joint cooperation of all seven major motion picture studios.

Universal Pictures made one of the first feature-length DCPs created to DCI specifications, using their film Serenity. Although it was not distributed theatrically, it had one public screening on November 7, 2005, at the USC Entertainment Technology Center's Digital Cinema Laboratory in the Pacific Theatre, Hollywood. Inside Man (2006) was Universal's first DCP commercial release, and, in addition to 35mm film distribution, was delivered via hard drive to 20 theatres in the United States along with two trailers.

The Academy Film Archive houses the Digital Cinema Initiatives, LLC Collection, which includes film and digital elements from DCI's Standard Evaluation Material (StEM), a 12-minute production shot on 35mm and 65mm film, created for vendors and standards organizations to test and evaluate image compression and digital projection technologies.

== Bibliography ==
- High frame rates digital cinema recommended practice, DCI, 2015 (PDF)
