= Comparison of movie cameras =

This article summarized the comparison of movie cameras.

== 35 mm ==
The 35 mm film gauge has long been the most common gauge in professional usage, and thus enjoys the greatest number of cameras currently available for professional usage. The modern era of 35 mm cameras dates to 1972, when Arri's Arriflex 35BL and Panavision's original Panaflex models emerged as the first self-blimped, lightweight cameras. Another distinguishing characteristic of modern cameras is the adoption of stronger lens mount seatings secured with a breech lock – namely the Arri PL and PV mount, both of which were designs descended from the BNCR mount of Mitchell cameras.

=== General ===
- Camera model – specific camera body models and variants, usually officially authorized
- Camera line – either the body family (similar bodies) or system family (complementary design)
- Manufacturer – company of origin
- Introduced – first year of known usage
- Weight – usually just the body, but may include accessories as mentioned
- MOS/sync – Sync-sound cameras are able to both maintain a constant speed (usually crystal lock) and run quietly enough not to be heard by the sound recordist. MOS cameras do not meet either one or both of these requirements, and are usually used either for applications where camera noise is not a concern, or non-standard camera speeds are required. A camera is also deemed MOS if it cannot hold a constant speed, regardless of its noise levels.
- Noise level – measured noise made by the camera, dB(A), with film and at a given distance from the film plane, usually one meter. MOS cameras do not have a measured noise level since they are not intended to be used with recorded sound and thus are much louder.

A limited number of cameras prior to the modern period are listed due to their prevalence in special applications.

Camera model	Camera line	Manufacturer	Introduced	Weight	MOS/sync	Noise level
Eyemo 71K	Eyemo	Bell and Howell	1925	11 lb (5.0 kg)	MOS	N/A
Arriflex 35-2C	Arriflex 35 II	Arri	1964	13.5 lb (6.1 kg), with empty magazine	MOS	N/A
Arriflex 35BL-1	Arriflex 35BL	Arri	1972	28.5 lb (12.9 kg), with empty magazine	Sync	26 dB
Panaflex-X	Panaflex	Panavision	1974	20.5 lb (9.3 kg)	Sync	<24 dB
Arriflex 35BL-2	Arriflex 35BL	Arri	1975	28.5 lb (12.9 kg), with empty magazine	Sync	26 dB
Panaflex Gold II	Panaflex	Panavision	1976	24.4 lb (11.1 kg), with short eyepiece	Sync	<24 dB
Arriflex 35BL-3	Arriflex 35BL	Arri	1980	28.7 lb (13.0 kg), with empty magazine	Sync	22 dB
Arriflex 35-3C	Arriflex 35 III	Arri	1982	8.8 lb (4.0 kg); 13.5 lb (6.1 kg), with empty magazine	MOS	N/A
Moviecam SuperAmerica	Moviecam SuperAmerica	Moviecam	1984	29 lb (13 kg)	Sync	20 dB
Arriflex 35BL-4	Arriflex 35BL	Arri	1986	30.9 lb (14.0 kg), with empty magazine	Sync	22 dB
Panaflex Platinum	Panaflex	Panavision	1986	24 lb (11 kg)	Sync	<22 dB
Panaflex Panastar II	Panaflex Panastar	Panavision	1987	24.4 lb (11.1 kg)	MOS	N/A
Arriflex 35BL-4s	Arriflex 35BL	Arri	1988	31.9 lb (14.5 kg), with empty magazine	Sync	20 dB
Arriflex 535	Arriflex 535	Arri	1990	21.6 lb (9.8 kg), body only; 29.4 lb (13.3 kg), with finder; 36.4 lb (16.5 kg), with finder and empty magazine	Sync	19 dB
Moviecam Compact	Moviecam Compact	Moviecam	1990	13.6 lb (6.2 kg)	Sync	<20 dB
Arriflex 535B	Arriflex 535	Arri	1992	26 lb (12 kg), with empty magazine	Sync	19 dB
Arriflex 435	Arriflex 435	Arri	1995	14.3 lb (6.5 kg), without magazine	MOS	N/A
Arriflex 435ES	Arriflex 435	Arri	1995	14.3 lb (6.5 kg), without magazine	MOS	N/A
Moviecam SL	Moviecam SL	Moviecam	1995	8.25 lb (3.74 kg)	Sync	25 dB
Aaton 35-III	Aaton 35	Aaton	1997	16 lb (7.3 kg), with full magazine and onboard battery	Sync	30 dB (4 perf), 26 dB (3 perf)
Panaflex Millennium	Panaflex Millennium	Panavision	1997	17.5 lb (7.9 kg)	Sync	<19 dB
Panaflex Millennium XL	Panaflex Millennium	Panavision	1999	11.8 lb (5.4 kg)	Sync	<23 dB
Arricam LT	Arricam	Arri	2000	8.7 lb (3.9 kg), body only; 11.56 lb (5.24 kg), with finder	Sync	<24 dB
Arricam ST	Arricam	Arri	2000	11.9 lb (5.4 kg), body only; 17.95 lb (8.14 kg), with finder	Sync	<20 dB
Arriflex 435 Advanced	Arriflex 435	Arri	2001	14.3 lb (6.5 kg), without magazine	MOS	N/A
Aaton 35-3P	Aaton 35	Aaton	2002	16 lb (7.3 kg), with full magazine and onboard battery	Sync	30 dB (4 perf), 24 dB (3 perf)
Arriflex 235	Arriflex 235	Arri	2004	7.7 lb (3.5 kg), with viewfinder	MOS	N/A
Arriflex 435 Xtreme	Arriflex 435	Arri	2004	14.3 lb (6.5 kg), without magazine	MOS	N/A
Panaflex Millennium XL2	Panaflex Millennium	Panavision	2004			
Aaton Penelope	Aaton Penelope	Aaton	2008	17 lb (7.7 kg), with full magazine and onboard battery	Sync	23 dB (3 perf), 22 dB (2 perf)

=== Lens and gate aperture ===
- Lens mount – the type of mount required for using the camera. Certain lenses may not be able to be used with particular cameras if the mounts are incompatible. The lens mount must be shifted to be centered to accommodate the Super 16 format from standard 16.
- Aperture size – the size of the aperture of the gate.
- Aperture plate – is the gate removable for inspection and what accessories may it have?
- Lens interface – electronic information system located in the lens mount to communicate lens data to the camera and accessories.
- Ground glass – interchangeable ground glasses allow for the viewfinder to display whichever aspect ratio is being framed for.
- Frameline glow – can the camera make the framelines glow for easier viewing in low-light conditions?

Camera model	Lens mount	Super 35?	Aperture size	Aperture plate	Lens interface	Ground glass	Frameline glow?
Eyemo 71K	Eyemo mount, many conversions	No, but conversions exist	Full frame	fixed	none	interchangeable	No
Arriflex 35-2C	Arri standard and Arri bayonet	No, but conversions exist	Academy ratio	fixed	none	interchangeable	No
Arriflex 35BL-1	Arri bayonet	No	Academy ratio, custom sizes exist	removable	none	interchangeable	No
Panaflex-X	PV mount;	Yes	Full frame	removable; interchangeable format masks	none	interchangeable	Yes
Arriflex 35BL-2	Arri bayonet	No	Academy ratio, custom sizes exist	removable	none	interchangeable	No
Panaflex Gold II	PV mount	Yes	Full frame	removable; interchangeable format masks	none	interchangeable	Yes
Arriflex 35BL-3	Arri PL or BNCR mount	No	Academy ratio, custom sizes exist	removable	none, but Lens Data Archive (LDA) can be used	interchangeable	No
Arriflex 35-3C	Arri PL	No	Academy ratio	removable	none, but Lens Data Archive (LDA) can be used	interchangeable	No
Moviecam SuperAmerica	Arri PL and BNCR mount	Yes	full range available	removable	none, but Lens Data Archive (LDA) can be used	interchangeable	Yes
Arriflex 35BL-4	Arri PL	Yes	Academy ratio, custom sizes exist	removable	none, but Lens Data Archive (LDA) can be used	interchangeable	Yes
Panaflex Platinum	PV mount	Yes	Full frame	removable; interchangeable format masks	none	interchangeable	Yes
Panaflex Panastar II	PV mount	Yes	Full frame	removable; interchangeable format masks	none	interchangeable	Yes
Arriflex 35BL-4s	Arri PL	Yes	Academy ratio, custom sizes exist	removable	none, but Lens Data Archive (LDA) can be used	interchangeable	Yes
Arriflex 535	Arri PL	Yes	full range available	removable; interchangeable format masks and filter holders	none, but Lens Data Archive (LDA) can be used	interchangeable	Yes
Moviecam Compact	Arri PL and BNCR mount	Yes	full range available	removable	none, but Lens Data Archive (LDA) can be used	interchangeable	Yes
Arriflex 535B	Arri PL	Yes	full range available	removable; interchangeable format masks and filter holders	none, but Lens Data Archive (LDA) can be used	interchangeable	Yes
Arriflex 435	Arri PL, PV mount	Yes	full range available	removable; interchangeable format masks and filter holders	none, but Lens Data Archive (LDA) can be used	interchangeable	Yes
Arriflex 435ES	Arri PL, PV mount	Yes	full range available	removable; interchangeable format masks and filter holders	none, but Lens Data Archive (LDA) can be used	interchangeable	Yes
Moviecam SL	Arri PL	Yes	full range available	removable	none, but Lens Data Archive (LDA) can be used	interchangeable	Yes
Aaton 35-III	Arri PL, PV mount, or Nikon	Yes	full frame	fixed	none, but Lens Data Archive (LDA) can be used	interchangeable	Yes
Panaflex Millennium	PV mount	Yes	full frame	removable; interchangeable format masks	none	interchangeable	Yes
Panaflex Millennium XL	PV mount	Yes	full frame	removable; interchangeable format masks	none	interchangeable	Yes
Arricam LT	Arri PL	Yes	full frame	removable; interchangeable format masks and filter holders	Lens Data System (LDS) contacts; integrated Lens Data Box (LDB)	interchangeable	Yes
Arricam ST	Arri PL	Yes	full frame	removable; interchangeable format masks and filter holders	Lens Data System (LDS) contacts; integrated Lens Data Box (LDB)	interchangeable	Yes
Arriflex 435 Advanced	Arri PL, PV mount	Yes	full frame	removable; interchangeable format masks and filter holders	Lens Data System (LDS) contacts; usable with FEM-2 unit	interchangeable	Yes
Aaton 35-3P	Arri PL, PV mount, or Nikon	Yes	full frame	fixed	none, but Lens Data Archive (LDA) can be used	interchangeable	Yes
Arriflex 235	Arri PL	Yes	full frame	removable	none, but Lens Data Archive (LDA) can be used	interchangeable	Yes
Arriflex 435 Xtreme	Arri PL, PV mount	Yes	full range available	removable; interchangeable format masks and filter holders	Lens Data System (LDS) contacts and integrated electronics	interchangeable	Yes

=== Shutter ===
- Reflex – is the shutter a reflex mirror design?
- Design – rotary disc shutters have two common designs – a "half-moon" disc of 180° or "butterfly" of two e.g. 90° segments opposite each other which spin at half-speed.
- Location – where the shutter is centered
- Adjustment – how the shutter angle can be adjusted. Most manual designs can only be adjusted when the camera is not running, often with the lens removed. All electronic shutters allow adjustment at all times, including when the camera is running.
- Angles – shutter angles available and in what increments or stops, if not continuous.

Camera model	Reflex?	Design	Location	Adjustment	Angles
Eyemo 71K	No, but many conversions	Half-moon	Beside gate	fixed	160°; many conversions for different angles
Arriflex 35-2C	Yes	Butterfly	Underneath gate	fixed	180°, although the V/B variant is adjustable from 0° to 165°
Arriflex 35BL-1	Yes	Butterfly	Underneath gate	fixed	180°
Panaflex-X	Yes	Butterfly	Beside gate	manually while running or in standby	between 50° and 200°, continuously adjustable
Arriflex 35BL-2	Yes	Butterfly	Underneath gate	fixed	180°
Panaflex Gold II	Yes	Butterfly	Beside gate	manually while running or in standby	between 50° and 200°, continuously adjustable
Arriflex 35BL-3	Yes	Half-moon	Underneath gate	manual	stops at 144°, 172.8°, and 180°
Arriflex 35-3C	Yes	Butterfly	Underneath gate	manual	0° to 165° with stops every 15°
Moviecam SuperAmerica	Yes	Half-moon	Underneath gate	manual	stops at 45°, 90°, 120°, 144°, 172.8°, and 180°.
Arriflex 35BL-4	Yes	Half-moon	Underneath gate	manual	stops at 144°, 172.8°, and 180°
Panaflex Platinum	Yes	Butterfly	Beside gate	electronic or manually while running or in standby	between 50° and 200°, in 0.1° stops
Panaflex Panastar II	Yes	Butterfly	Beside gate	electronic or manually while running or in standby	between 45° and 180°, in 0.1° stops
Arriflex 35BL-4s	Yes	Half-moon	Underneath gate	manual	stops at 144°, 172.8°, and 180°
Arriflex 535	Yes	Half-moon	Underneath gate	electronic	between 11° and 180°, in 0.01° stops
Moviecam Compact	Yes	Half-moon	Underneath gate	manual	stops at 45°, 90°, 120°, 144°, 172.8°, and 180°. 22.5° available on newer models.
Arriflex 535B	Yes	Half-moon	Underneath gate	manual	stops every 15° between 15° and 180°, also stops at 144° and 172.8°
Arriflex 435	Yes	Half-moon	Underneath gate	manual	stops every 15° between 30° and 135°, also stops at 11.2°, 22.5°, 144°, 172.8°, and 180°
Arriflex 435ES	Yes	Half-moon	Underneath gate	electronic	between 11.2° and 180°, in 0.1° stops
Moviecam SL	Yes	Half-moon	Underneath gate	manual	stops at 22.5°, 45°, 90°, 120°, 144°, 172.8°, and 180°.
Aaton 35-III	Yes	Half-moon	Underneath gate	manual	stops at 144°, 150°, 172.8°, and 180°
Panaflex Millennium	Yes	Butterfly	Beside gate	electronic or manually while running or in standby	between 11.2° and 180°, in 0.1° stops
Panaflex Millennium XL	Yes	Butterfly	Beside gate	electronic or manually while running or in standby	between 11.2° and 180°, in 0.1° stops
Arricam LT	Yes	Half-moon	Underneath gate	electronic	between 0° and 180°, in 0.1° stops
Arricam ST	Yes	Half-moon	Underneath gate	electronic	between 0° and 180°, in 0.1° stops
Arriflex 435 Advanced	Yes	Half-moon	Underneath gate	electronic	between 11.2° and 180°, in 0.1° stops
Aaton 35-3P	Yes	Half-moon	Underneath gate	manual	stops at 144°, 150°, 172.8°, and 180°
Arriflex 235	Yes	Half-moon	Underneath gate	manual	stops every 15° between 45° and 150°, also stops at 144°, 172.8°, and 180°
Arriflex 435 Xtreme	Yes	Half-moon	Underneath gate	electronic	between 11.2° and 180°, in 0.1° stops

=== Movement ===
- Movement type – design of the movement mechanism
- Pulldown claws – number of claws which engage the film perforations to transport the film while the shutter is closed. Some claws may have more than one pin in order to engage multiple perfs at a time.
- Registration pins – number of pins which engage the film perforations during exposure in order to ensure consistent image stability from frame to frame.
- Frame rate (forward) – range of speeds in frame/s (frames per second) and smallest increments of change allowed. Accessories noted where required for certain speeds.
- Frame rate (reverse) – range of speeds in frame/s (frames per second) and smallest increments of change allowed. Accessories noted where required for certain speeds.
- Motor – type of motor, voltage, crystal-controlled speeds (Xtal)
- Pulldown – negative pulldown options available
- Pitch control? – does the camera allow for adjustment of the pulldown claw to optimize camera noise and avoid perforation damage?

Camera model	Movement type	Pulldown claws	Registration pins	Frame rate (forward)	Frame rate (reverse)	Motor	Pulldown	Pitch control?
Eyemo 71K	clockwork mechanism	1	0	4–50 frame/s	No	spring-wound, several motors available	4 perf	No
Arriflex 35-2C	cam-driven	1	0	depends on motor; speeds ranging from 5–80 frame/s available	No	several available, including 32V DC handgrip, 16V DC governor, 24-28V DC and 16V DC variables.	4 perf	No
Arriflex 35BL-1	cam-driven	4	2	5–100 frame/s	No	12V DC, Xtal at 24, 25, and 30 frame/s	4 perf	No
Panaflex-X	Mitchell-design, cam driven	2	2	4–34 frame/s	No	24V DC brushed, Xtal at 24, 25, and 29.97 frame/s	4 and 3 perf	Yes
Arriflex 35BL-2	cam-driven	2	2	5–50 frame/s	No	12V DC, Xtal at 24, 25, and 30 frame/s	4 perf	No
Panaflex Gold II	Mitchell-design, cam driven	2	2	4–34 frame/s	No	24V DC brushed, Xtal at 24, 25, and 29.97 frame/s	4 and 3 perf	Yes
Arriflex 35BL-3	cam-driven	2	2	5–50 frame/s	No	12V DC, Xtal at 24, 25, and 30 frame/s	4 perf	No
Arriflex 35-3C	cam-driven	1 (dual-pin)	1	4–100 frame/s; some models can reach 130 frame/s	4–100 frame/s; some models can reach 130 frame/s	12/24V DC, Xtal at 24, 25, and 30 frame/s	4 and 3 perf	No
Moviecam SuperAmerica	compensating link movement	2	2	12–32 frame/s in 1 frame/s increments; 1–50 frame/s in 0.001 frame/s increments with speedbox	12–32 frame/s in 0.001 frame/s increments with speedbox	24V DC microprocessor-controlled, Xtal at all speeds	4 perf	Yes
Arriflex 35BL-4	cam-driven	2	2	5–40 frame/s	No	12V DC, Xtal at 24, 25, and 30 frame/s	4 perf	No
Panaflex Platinum	Mitchell-design, cam driven	2	2	4–36 frame/s in 0.1 frame/s increments	4–36 frame/s in 0.1 frame/s increments	24V DC brushed, Xtal at all speeds	4 and 3 perf	Yes
Panaflex Panastar II	Mitchell-design, cam driven	4	2	4–120 frame/s in 1 frame/s increments	4–120 frame/s in 1 frame/s increments	24V DC brushed, Xtal at all speeds	4 and 3 perf	Yes
Arriflex 35BL-4s	seven-link movement	2	2	5–40 frame/s	No	12V DC, Xtal at 24, 25, and 30 frame/s	4 and 3 perf	Yes
Arriflex 535	seven-link movement	2	2	3–50 frame/s in 0.001 frame/s increments; 1 frame/s if phase button held	3–50 frame/s in 0.001 frame/s increments	24V DC microprocessor-controlled, Xtal at 1, 24, 25, 29.97, and 30 frame/s forwards	4 and 3 perf	Yes
Moviecam Compact	compensating link movement	2	2	12–32 frame/s in 1 frame/s increments; 2–50 frame/s in 0.001 frame/s increments with speedbox	12–32 frame/s in 0.001 frame/s increments with speedbox	24V DC microprocessor-controlled, Xtal at all speeds	4 perf; 3 perf available for Mk 2	Yes
Arriflex 535B	seven-link movement	2	2	3–60 frame/s in 0.001 frame/s increments; 1 frame/s if phase button held	3–60 frame/s in 0.001 frame/s increments	24V DC microprocessor-controlled, Xtal at all speeds	4 and 3 perf	Yes
Arriflex 435	five-link movement	2 (3-pin)	2	1–150 frame/s in 0.001 frame/s increments up to 100 frame/s and 0.01 frame/s increments after	1–150 frame/s in 0.001 frame/s increments up to 100 frame/s and 0.01 frame/s increments after	DC quartz-controlled, Xtal at all speeds	4 and 3 perf	Yes
Arriflex 435ES	five-link movement	2 (3-pin)	2	1–150 frame/s in 0.001 frame/s increments up to 100 frame/s and 0.01 frame/s increments after	1–150 frame/s in 0.001 frame/s increments up to 100 frame/s and 0.01 frame/s increments after	DC quartz-controlled, Xtal at all speeds	4 and 3 perf	Yes
Moviecam SL	compensating link movement	2	2	12–40 frame/s in 1 frame/s increments; 2–40 frame/s in 0.001 frame/s increments with speedbox	12–32 frame/s in 0.001 frame/s increments with speedbox (Compact mags only)	24V DC microprocessor-controlled, Xtal at all speeds	4 perf	Yes
Aaton 35-III	magnetic drive wheels between body and mag	co-planar	No	3-32 frame/s in 0.001 frame/s increments	No	tri-phase brushless, Xtal at all speeds	4 and 3 perf	Yes
Panaflex Millennium	Mitchell-design, cam driven	2	2	3–50 frame/s in 0.001 frame/s increments	3–50 frame/s in 0.001 frame/s increments	dual brushless for shutter and movement, single variable for shutter angle, Xtal all speeds	4 and 3 perf	Yes
Panaflex Millennium XL	Mitchell-design, cam driven	2	2	3–40 frame/s in 0.001 frame/s increments	No	dual brushless for shutter and movement, single variable for shutter angle, Xtal all speeds	4 and 3 perf	Yes
Arricam LT	five-link movement	2	2	1–48 frame/s in 0.001 frame/s increments; speeds with decimal places must be set with accessories	1–32 frame/s in 0.001 frame/s increments; speeds with decimal places must be set with accessories	dual brushless for shutter and movement, Xtal all speeds	4, 3, and 2 perf	Yes
Arricam ST	five-link movement	2	2	1–60 frame/s in 0.001 frame/s increments; speeds with decimal places must be set with accessories	1–32 frame/s in 0.001 frame/s increments; speeds with decimal places must be set with accessories	dual brushless for shutter and movement, Xtal all speeds	4, 3, and 2 perf	Yes
Arriflex 435 Advanced	five-link movement	2 (3-pin)	2	0.1–150 frame/s in 0.001 frame/s increments up to 100 frame/s and 0.01 frame/s increments after	0.1–150 frame/s in 0.001 frame/s increments up to 100 frame/s and 0.01 frame/s increments after	DC quartz-controlled, Xtal at all speeds	4 and 3 perf	Yes
Aaton 35-3P	magnetic drive wheels between body and mag	co-planar	No	2-40 frame/s in 0.001 frame/s increments	No	triphase brushless, Xtal at all speeds	4 and 3 perf	Yes
Arriflex 235	five-link movement	1 (dual-pin)	1	1–75 frame/s in 0.001 frame/s increments	25 frame/s (can't be used with shoulder mags or older 200' mags)	DC quartz-controlled, Xtal at all speeds	4, 3, and 2 perf	No
Arriflex 435 Xtreme	five-link movement	2 (3-pin)	2	0.1–150 frame/s in 0.001 frame/s increments up to 100 frame/s and 0.01 frame/s increments after	0.1–150 frame/s in 0.001 frame/s increments up to 100 frame/s and 0.01 frame/s increments after	DC quartz-controlled, Xtal at all speeds	4 and 3 perf	Yes

=== Viewfinder ===
Camera model	Viewfinder
Eyemo 71K	Originally parallax, but reflex conversions frequently use Arri eyepiece accessories.
Arriflex 35-2C	Fixed eyepiece on camera door; 6.5x magnified image. Interchangeable doors for pivoting or anamorphic viewfinders available. A periscope attachment accessory can also be used for odd angles, but will slightly crop the frame in the viewfinder.
Arriflex 35BL-1	Standard and anamorphic extension tubes; eyepiece rotates 90° above and below level with continuous upright image.
Panaflex-X	Fixed angle and includes integrated anamorphic switch and contrast viewing filters (ND .6 and .9). Short, medium and long eyepieces; all can be heated and have manual iris. Medium and long eyepieces include extra magnifier switch.
Arriflex 35BL-2	Standard and anamorphic extension tubes; eyepiece rotates 90° above and below level with continuous upright image.
Panaflex Gold II	Rotates 360° vertically with continuously upright image and includes integrated anamorphic switch and contrast viewing filters (ND .6 and .9). Short, medium and long eyepieces; all can be heated and have manual iris. Medium and long eyepieces include extra magnifier switch.
Arriflex 35BL-3	Standard and anamorphic extension tubes; eyepiece rotates 90° above and below level with continuous upright image.
Arriflex 35-3C	6.5x magnified image; doors can be changed between fixed eyepiece, 210° rotating eyepiece, and offset eyepiece.
Moviecam SuperAmerica	Spherical and anamorphic short eyepieces, spherical long eyepiece, and long eyepiece with anamorphic switch. Orientable viewfinder block also allows rotation from left to right of and extension away from the camera, but standard viewfinder does not. Both can rotate 360° vertically, offer continuous upright image, and include an integrated contrast viewing filter (ND .6), heated eyepiece, and manual iris. 6.1x magnification, with 2.4x zoom available on long eyepieces.
Arriflex 35BL-4	Super wide angle eyepiece with 6.5x magnification and manual iris. Standard and anamorphic extension tubes, as well as a longer standard tube with switchable contrast viewing filter and 2x zoom; eyepiece rotates 90° above and below level with continuous upright image. Bigger exit pupil for brighter image than older BL models.
Panaflex Platinum	Rotates 360° vertically with continuously upright image and includes integrated anamorphic switch and contrast viewing filters (ND .6 and .9). Short, medium and long eyepieces; all can be heated and have manual iris. Medium and long eyepieces include extra magnifier switch.
Panaflex Panastar II	Rotates 360° vertically with continuously upright image and includes integrated anamorphic switch and contrast viewing filters (ND .6 and .9). Short, medium and long eyepieces; all can be heated and have manual iris. Medium and long eyepieces include extra magnifier switch.
Arriflex 35BL-4s	Super wide angle eyepiece with 6.5x magnification and manual iris. Standard and anamorphic extension tubes, as well as a longer standard tube with switchable contrast viewing filter and 2x zoom; eyepiece rotates 90° above and below level with continuous upright image. Bigger exit pupil for brighter image than older BL models.
Arriflex 535	Spherical and anamorphic viewfinders; can rotate vertically and left to right, with upright image continuously. Switchable contrast viewing filters (ND .3 and .6); medium and long extension tubes, heated eyepiece, and manual iris.
Moviecam Compact	Spherical and anamorphic short eyepieces, spherical long eyepiece, and long eyepiece with anamorphic switch. Orientable viewfinder block also allows rotation from left to right of and extension away from the camera, but standard viewfinder does not. Both can rotate 360° vertically, offer continuous upright image, and include an integrated contrast viewing filter (ND .6), heated eyepiece, and manual iris. 6.1x magnification, with 2.4x zoom available on long eyepieces.
Arriflex 535B	Spherical and anamorphic viewfinders; can rotate vertically and left to right, with upright image continuously. Switchable contrast viewing filters (ND .3 and .6); medium and long extension tubes, heated eyepiece, and manual iris.
Arriflex 435	Spherical and anamorphic viewfinders; can rotate 360° vertically and 270° left to right, with upright image continuously and can be extended out. Integrated contrast viewing filter (ND .6); medium and long extension tubes, heated eyepiece, and manual iris.
Arriflex 435ES	Spherical and anamorphic viewfinders; can rotate 360° vertically and 270° left to right, with upright image continuously and can be extended out. Integrated contrast viewing filter (ND .6); medium and long extension tubes, heated eyepiece, and manual iris.
Moviecam SL	Spherical and anamorphic short eyepieces, spherical long eyepiece, and long eyepiece with anamorphic switch. Orientable viewfinder block also allows rotation from left to right of and extension away from the camera, but standard viewfinder does not. Both can rotate 360° vertically, offer continuous upright image, and include an integrated contrast viewing filter (ND .6), heated eyepiece, and manual iris. 6.1x magnification, with 2.4x zoom available on long eyepieces.
Aaton 35-III	Short, medium, and long eyepieces, also available in anamorphic; all can rotate 360° and to left or right of camera with upright image continuously and have manual iris. Heated eyepiece integrated into long eyepiece and optional in medium eyepiece.
Panaflex Millennium	Rotates 360° vertically with continuously upright image and includes integrated anamorphic switch and contrast viewing filters (ND .6 and .9). Short, medium and long eyepieces; all can be heated and have manual iris. Medium and long eyepieces include extra magnifier switch.
Panaflex Millennium XL	Rotates 360° vertically with continuously upright image and includes integrated anamorphic switch and contrast viewing filters (ND .6 and .9). Short, medium and long eyepieces; all can be heated and have manual iris. Medium and long eyepieces include extra magnifier switch.
Arricam LT	Can use LT, ST, LT universal, or ST universal viewfinders (universals have anamorphic switch); all can rotate 360° and to left or right of camera with upright image continuously. Integrated contrast viewing filter (ND .6); medium and long extension tubes, heated eyepiece, and manual iris.
Arricam ST	Can use LT, ST, LT universal, or ST universal viewfinders (universals have anamorphic switch); all can rotate 360° and to left or right of camera with upright image continuously. Integrated contrast viewing filter (ND .6); medium and long extension tubes, heated eyepiece, and manual iris.
Arriflex 435 Advanced	Spherical and anamorphic viewfinders; can rotate 360° vertically and 270° left to right, with upright image continuously and can be extended out. Integrated contrast viewing filter (ND .6); medium and long extension tubes, heated eyepiece, and manual iris.
Aaton 35-3P	Short, medium, and long eyepieces, also available in anamorphic; all can rotate 360° and to left or right of camera with upright image continuously and have manual iris. Heated eyepiece integrated into long eyepiece and optional in medium eyepiece.
Arriflex 235	spherical or universal (with anamorphic switch) viewfinder; arm can telescope further away from camera, rotate 360° on camera axis, and 270° left and right of camera, all with continuous upright image. Optional heated eyecup; medium and long extension tubes, heated eyepiece, and manual iris.
Arriflex 435 Xtreme	Spherical and anamorphic viewfinders; can rotate 360° vertically and 270° left to right, with upright image continuously and can be extended out. Integrated contrast viewing filter (ND .6); medium and long extension tubes, heated eyepiece, and manual iris.

== 16 mm ==
16 mm film occupies a rather curious position within filmmaking – with a wide range encompassing virtually every field – amateur home movies, student films, experimental films, television work, commercials, music videos, corporate films, industrial research, medical applications, and lower budget features. Its robust image quality in relation to its size allows for a much more versatile, accessible, and affordable usage in many fields where neither 35 mm nor Super 8 would be well-suited. Despite current challenges from the burgeoning digital video market, the consistent improvement of cameras, lenses, and film stocks have enabled the Super 16 format to flourish recently, with many labs reporting increased usage. The modern era of 16 mm cameras is concurrent with that of 35 mm for both the same reasons as 35 mm as well as an additional change: the creation of the Super 16 format by Rune Ericsson in 1971. The format expanded the usable film negative horizontally, which required a larger film gate and necessitated either specialized conversion of machined parts or purchase of new cameras designed with Super 16 gates. Since the format took more than a decade to slowly standardize, the competition from both high and low end video cameras has decimated the demand for 16 mm cameras for most non-professional usage. Therefore, there are relatively few Super 16 cameras, although most are considered professional-grade.

=== General ===
A limited number of cameras prior to this period are listed due to their prevalence in special applications.

Camera model	Camera line	Manufacturer	Introduced	Weight	MOS/sync	Lens mount
7LTR (Super 16)	Aaton LTR	Aaton	1974		Sync	Aaton universal
54LTR	Aaton LTR	Aaton	1982		Sync	Aaton universal
Arriflex 16HSR2 (Super 16)	Arriflex 16SR	Arri	1982	11.02 lb (5.00 kg), with empty magazine	Sync	Arri bayonet (Arri PL for some later models)
Arriflex 16SR2 (Super 16)	Arriflex 16SR	Arri	1982	11.02 lb (5.00 kg), with empty magazine	Sync	Arri bayonet (Arri PL for some later models)
Panaflex 16 ("The Elaine")	Panaflex 16	Panavision	June 27, 1984	16.6 lb (7.5 kg), with eyepiece	Sync	PV mount
XTR	Aaton XTR	Aaton	1984		Sync	Aaton universal
Arriflex 16HSR3	Arriflex 16SR	Arri	1992	14.5 lb (6.6 kg)	Sync	Arri PL
Arriflex 16SR3	Arriflex 16SR	Arri	1992	14.5 lb (6.6 kg)	Sync	Arri PL
X0plus	Aaton XTR	Aaton	1992		Sync	Aaton universal
XTRplus	Aaton XTR	Aaton	1992		Sync	Aaton universal
XTRprod	Aaton XTR	Aaton	1994	13 lb (5.9 kg), with onboard battery and full magazine	Sync	Arri PL, Aaton universal, or PV mount
A-Minima	A-Minima	Aaton	2000	5 lb (2.3 kg), with onboard battery and full magazine	Sync	Arri PL and Nikon
Arriflex 416	Arriflex 416	Arri	2006	12.1 lb (5.5 kg), with full magazine	Sync	Arri PL
Arriflex 416 Plus	Arriflex 416	Arri	2006	12.6 lb (5.7 kg), with full magazine	Sync	Arri PL
Xtera	Aaton XTR	Aaton	2006		Sync	Arri PL, Aaton universal, or PV mount
