= Arriflex 765 =

65 mm movie camera by Arri

- Variant models: Arriflex 765
- Manufacturer: Arri
- Introduced: 1989
- Gauge: 65 mm
- Weight: 32 kg/70 lbs with loaded 500'magazine
- Movement: dual registration pins and pulldown claws, 5-perf pulldown
- Speed: 2–100 frames per second
- Aperture plate: removable
- Motor: DC with quartz crystal control
- Operating noise level: MOS
- Indicators: speed, run, counter (ft or m), shutter angle, time code (user bit and sensitivity level), voltage, incorrect movement, asynchronous speed, low battery, film end
- Lens mount: Maxi PL Mount, 64 mm
- Lens control: Arri-style follow focus
- Shutter: reflex mirror; manual model stops at 15°, 30°, 45°, 60°, 75°, 90°, 105°, 120°, 135°, 144°, 172.8° and 180°
- Viewfinder: covers 65 mm
- Video assist: Integrated Video System (IVS) or IVS-2; Standard 0.5 inch CCD camera mountable through C-mount
- Ground glass: Interchangeable. Arriglow module available.
- Magazines: top-mounted, available in 500 ft (150 m), 1000 ft (300 m)
- Film cores: standard cores
- Matte boxes: Arriflex MB or LMB models, 19 mm rods
- Electronic accessories: 24 V
- Other accessories: lightweight follow focus (LFF), lightweight support rods, third party accessories
- Batteries: 24V
- Camera support: Arrihead, bridge plate, handgrip, shoulder set, shoulder cushion, underslung bracket for Steadicam

The Arriflex 765 is a 65 mm movie camera created by Arri in 1989.

== History ==
The camera was conceptualized by Otto Blaschek, who had already engineered the Arriflex 35BL and the 35 III, for which he won the "Scientific and Engineering Award" of the Academy of Motion Pictures. The development of this camera started in 1983. The goal was to design a 65 mm movie camera, which was quiet enough to fit sync sound productions and had a similar ergonomy to 35 mm cameras, to answer the growing demand for 65 mm cameras. Other 65 mm cameras had noise production of up to 50 dBA, which made sound recording impossible.

The final Arri 765 uses four crystal sync motors, two in the body and two in the magazine, due to the wider and thus heavier film stock. This way it achieves less than 25 dBA at 24 fps.

The Arri 765 was used for special effects shots on Alien 3 and certain scenes of Far and Away (both 1992). Films shot on the Arri 765 include Shutter Island (2010), Gravity (2013) and The Hateful Eight (2015).

== Technical data ==
The Arri 765 is a 65 mm camera with a 5-perforation pull-down mechanism. The mirror reflex shutter is manually adjustable between 180° and 15° and has a diameter of 200 mm. The camera can record between 2 and 100 fps, the motors can run both in forward and reverse mode. Its power is 24 V, and multiple accessories can be powered through the camera, like Arriglow and Video Assist. The camera takes both 500 ft and 1000 ft magazines. Due to its compact build, it is adaptable to most 35 mm filmmaking workflows.

The camera with a loaded 500 ft magazine weighs 70 lbs (32 kg).
