= Arriflex 16BL =

German 16mm motion picture camera (1965)

The Arriflex 16BL is ARRI's first silent 16mm production motion picture camera, released in 1965. It was replaced by the Arriflex 16SR in 1975.

== Function ==
The functionality of the Arriflex 16BL is similar to the Arriflex 16M. It is built around the spinning reflex twin-bladed "butterfly" mirror shutter, set at 45 degrees horizontally to the lens axis. It is self-blimped and measures 31 dB while running, at a 3 ft distance from the camera.

The 16BL introduced the Arri Bayonet lens mount, which was also used in later cameras. This stainless steel mount is much stronger than the aluminium Arri standard mount. The viewfinder is located on the gate door.

The Arriflex 16BL can load 1200 ft and 400 ft external magazines, which can be attached to the top. The camera is driven by a 12V crystal control motor, which can be controlled on the right side. It can record between 8 and 48 fps.

The standard matte box is adjustable to fit the lenses' different focal lengths.

== Trivia ==
During the development this camera model was called Arriflex 16Q, for "quiet". The name was changed to Arriflex 16BL, for "blimp".

The Arriflex 16BL was used by Tim Philo to film Sam Raimi's The Evil Dead (1981)

The Arriflex 16BL remains popular with independent filmmakers because it is one of the most affordable silent 16mm cameras.
