= Arri =

Supplier of motion picture film equipment

Arnold & Richter Cine Technik (A&R)
- Type: Private
- Industry: Motion picture equipment
- Founded: 12 September 1917; 109 years ago
- Founders: August Arnold; Robert Richter
- Headquarters: Munich, Germany
- Products: Motion picture cameras Cinema lenses Lighting equipment Archive technologies Digital surgical microscope
- Revenue: €480 million (2021)
- Number of employees: 1,600 (2023)
- Parent: Riedel Communications
- Website: www.arri.com

Arri Group (Note: The company's original German pronunciation is /ˈɑːri/ ah-ree, though it frequently uses the pronunciation /ˈærɪ/ air-ee in English-speaking countries.) (stylized in all caps) is a German manufacturer of motion picture film equipment. Based in Munich, the company was founded in 1917. It produces professional motion picture cameras, lenses, lighting and post-production equipment. It is cited by Hermann Simon as an example of a "hidden champion". The Arri Alexa digital camera system, debuting in 2010, was used to shoot several films that won the Academy Award for Best Cinematography, including Hugo (2011), Life of Pi (2012), Gravity (2013), Birdman (2014), The Revenant (2015) and 1917 (2019).

== History ==
=== Early history ===
Arri was founded in Munich, Germany on 12 September 1917 by August Arnold and Robert Richter as Arnold & Richter Cine Technik. The acronym Arri was derived from the initial two letters of the founders' surnames, Arnold and Richter.

In 1924, Arnold and Richter developed their first film camera, the small and portable Kinarri 35. In 1937, Arri introduced the world's first reflex mirror shutter in the Arriflex 35 camera, an invention of longtime engineer Erich Kästner. This technology employs a rotating mirror that allows a continuous motor to operate the camera while providing parallax-free reflex viewing to the operator, and the ability to focus the image by eye through the viewfinder, much like an SLR camera for photography. The reflex design was subsequently used in almost every professional motion picture film camera and is still used in the Arri Alexa Studio digital camera. The first Hollywood film to employ an Arriflex was the 1947 Humphrey Bogart and Lauren Bacall film Dark Passage in 1947. Over the years, more than 17,000 Arriflex 35s were built. The design was recognized with two Scientific and Technical Academy Awards in 1966 and 1982.

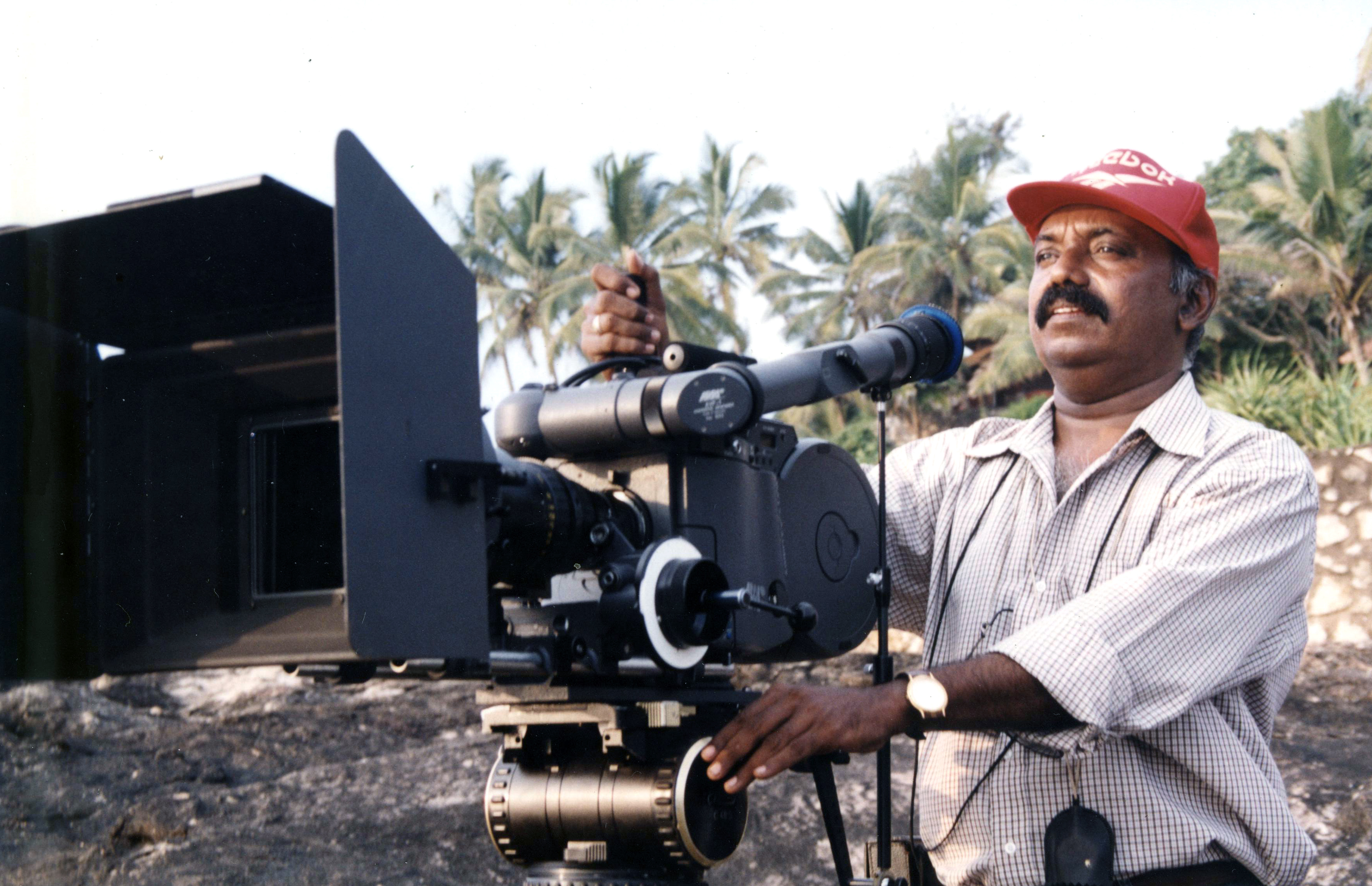
Indian cinematographer Ramachandra Babu with Arriflex 535B camera

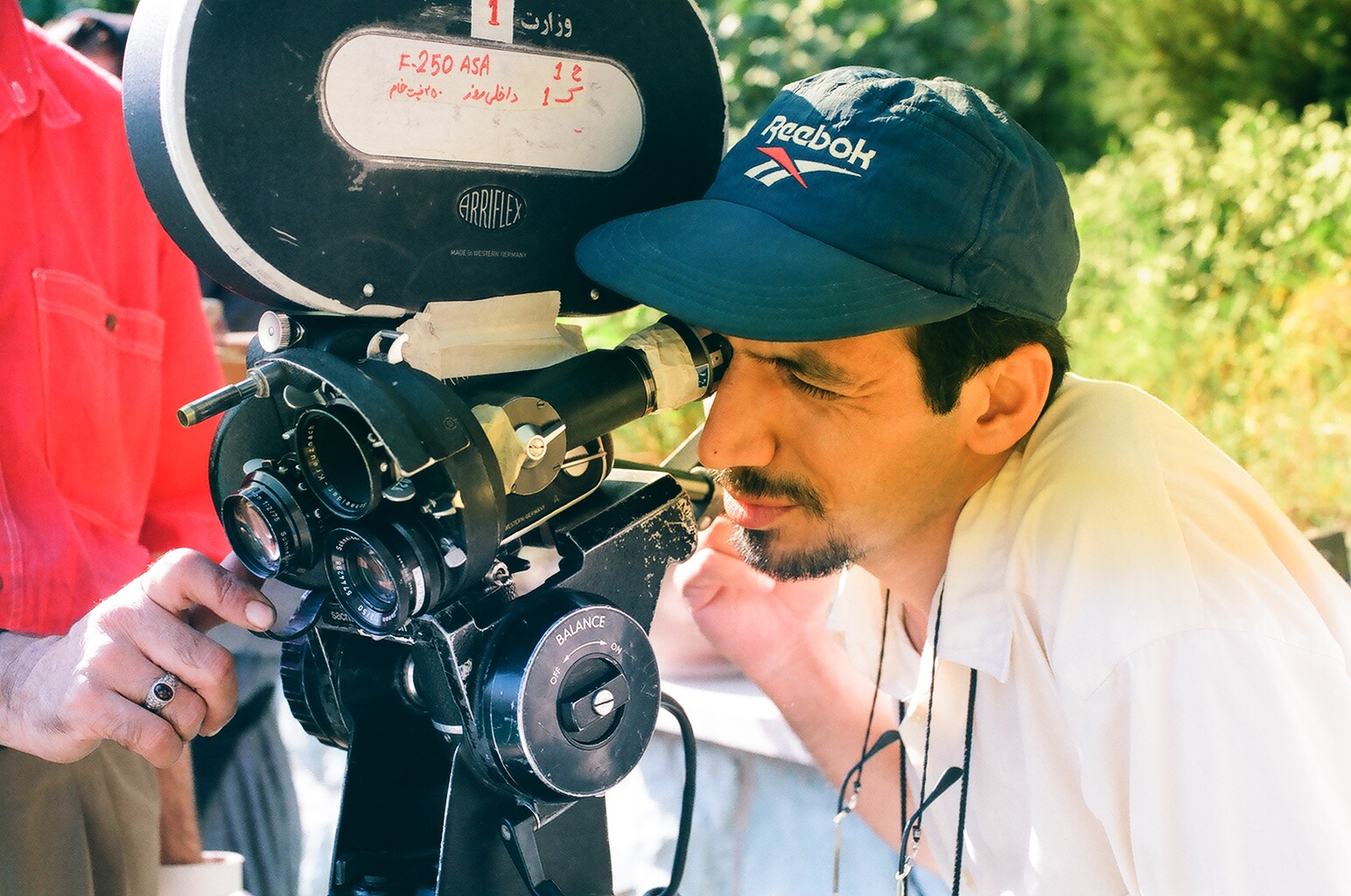
Arriflex camera being used by Abolfazl Attar

=== Rise and Appeasement under Nazi Rule (1926–1938) ===
In its early years, ARRI grew steadily: by 1927, the company had 20 employees, and five years later, it had already doubled that number.

When August Arnold and Robert Richter were not using their technology to produce films or segments for the newsreel (Wochenschau), they rented out their equipment to other film producers for a fee. This idea of renting equipment would later lead to the founding of ARRI Rental, now a major branch of ARRI's global business.

In 1928, the company developed the KINARRI 16, the first 16mm camera—a hand-cranked amateur model soon replaced by an improved version with a spring mechanism. In 1934, ARRI released a mobile sound camera, but due to patent issues, it was only used for the production of two films.

From 1927 onward, the company filmed the Reichsparteitage of the NSDAP, and after the party took power in Germany, ARRI ingratiated itself by sending letters presenting the firm as a longtime supporter. Richter and Arnold both joined the NSDAP in 1933. They hoped to gain protection, commissions, and recommendations for the renewed production of feature films under party-affiliated organizations.

The company hired directors and screenwriters who were aligned with the cultural policies of Nazi Germany, but after only three feature films produced in 1934–35 it abandoned feature-film production. These films were Grenzfeuer (1934), written and directed by Hanns Beck-Gaden; Die Frauen vom Tannhof (1934), directed by Franz Seitz Sr. from a screenplay by Joseph Dalmann; and Es waren zwei Junggesellen (1935), directed by Seitz, with a screenplay by Dalmann and Joe Stöckel.

In 1938, ARRI was commissioned to shoot a film documenting the destruction of the Old Main Synagogue in Munich.

In 1937, ARRI presented the ARRIFLEX 35 at the Leipzig Spring Fair, the first mass-produced reflex film camera. Engineer Erich Kästner played a decisive role, bringing the rotating mirror shutter to production readiness in motion picture cameras. For the first time, the ARRIFLEX 35 allowed users to view the precise frame and focus distribution through the viewfinder without parallax error.

The basic design of this camera is still used today in ARRI's digital ALEXA line.

=== Second World War (1939–1945) ===
From 1939 onwards, the German military became a major customer for ARRIFLEX cameras, which were used for propaganda purposes. Sales to the film industry were largely restricted. Although ARRI was not classified as an armaments manufacturer, in 1942 production was relocated from Türkenstraße in Munich to Brannenburg, approximately 70 km away.

On 13 July 1944, ARRI's Munich headquarters was completely destroyed in an Allied bombing raid.

During the war, a copy of the ARRIFLEX—called the Cineflex—was developed in the United States, primarily for military applications. After 1945, when ARRI was again able to deliver precision-engineered ARRIFLEX cameras from U.S.-occupied Bavaria, the American copy disappeared from the market.

Following the end of the war, ARRI immediately began rebuilding its headquarters in Munich. The reconstruction took place in several phases and lasted approximately ten years.

=== 1950–1989 ===
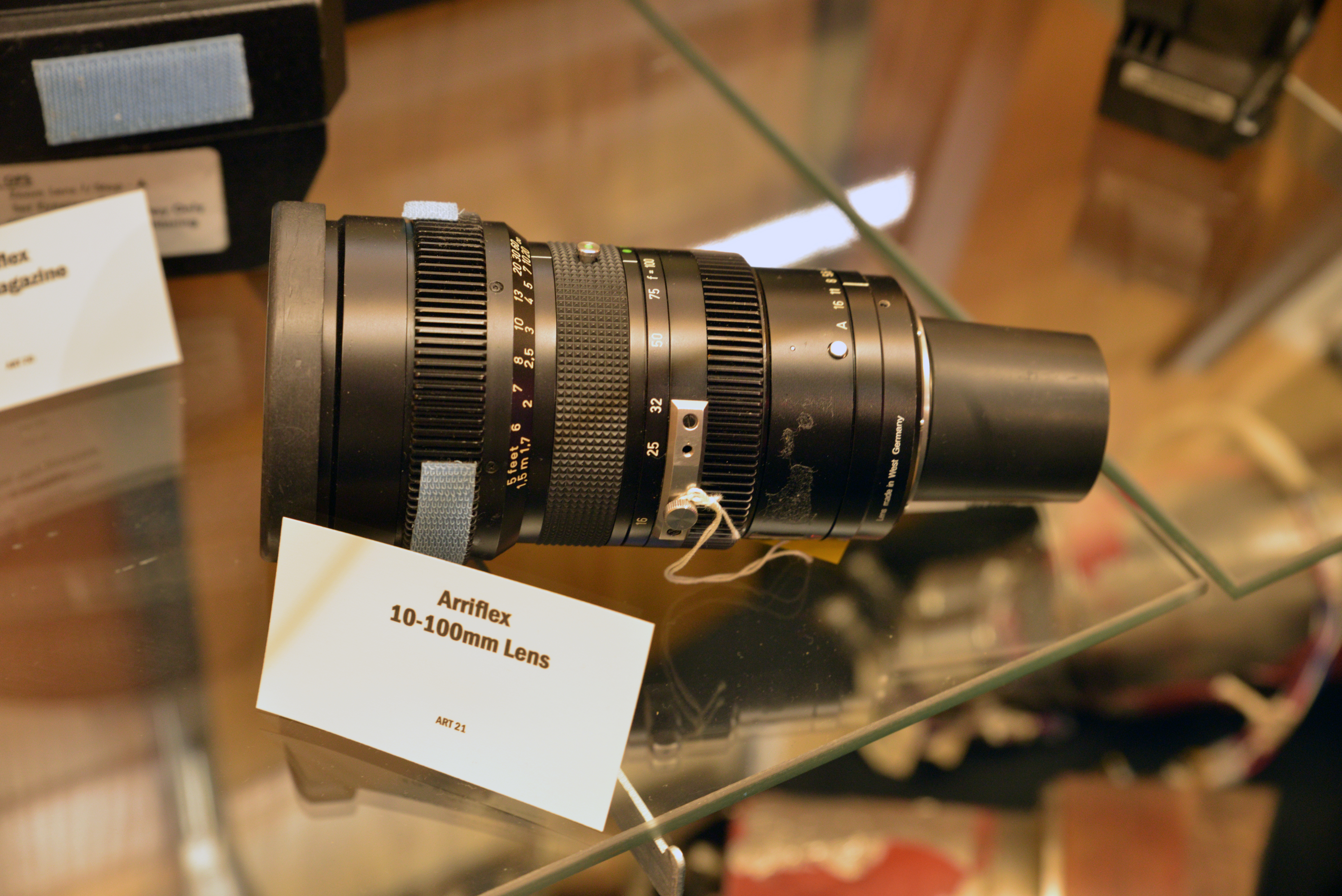
Lens used on Apollo missions

In 1952, Arri introduced the Arriflex 16ST, the first professional 16mm camera with a reflex viewing system. In 1965, a self-blimped 16mm camera was released: the Arriflex 16BL. The Arriflex 35BL followed in 1972 as a lightweight, quiet alternative to the rather heavy and cumbersome blimped cameras of the time. Also in 1972, Arri pioneered the development of daylight luminaires with the Arrisonne 2000 W. The Arriflex 16SR, launched in 1975, featured a redesigned viewfinder with a through-the-lens light meter. The Arriflex 765, a 65mm camera, was released in 1989, partly in response to the growing industry demand for 70mm release prints.

=== 1990–2009 ===
The Arriflex 535 camera was released in 1990, followed by the Arriflex 535B and the Arriflex 16SR 3 in 1992. The Arriflex 435 was released in 1994.

Arri partnered with Carl Zeiss AG in order to develop and manufacture advanced lenses for the motion picture industry. In 1998, Arri released the Ultra Prime lenses.

Development of the Arrilaser, a postproduction film recorder, began in 1997 and it was released for beta testing in 1998.

In 2000, Arri purchased the company Moviecam and developed Arricam, a 35mm camera platform. In 2003, Arri developed its first digital camera, the Arriflex D-20, which later evolved into the D-21. The camera used a 35mm CMOS sensor (instead of CCD) and allowed cinematographers to utilize standard 35mm lenses. This technology was further developed and improved for the Arri Alexa camera.

Arri revealed its Arriscan prototype during IBC 2003. The 16mm/35mm film scanner worked alongside the Arrilaser to support the increasingly popular digital intermediate route through post-production. Later, the Arriscan became a widely used tool for film restoration work and was recognized with a Scientific and Engineering Academy Award in 2009.

Arri released the Master Prime lenses in 2005, designed for a super-fast aperture of T1.3 without breathing and distortion. In 2007, the Master Prime 14mm and 150mm lenses were released.

The Arrilaser 2 was released in 2009, with new client-server architecture and speeds twice as fast as the original model. In 2011, the Arrilaser was recognized with an Academy Award of Merit.

=== 2010–present ===
In 2010, the Arri Alexa camera was released. The camera could compress 1080p footage to ProRes QuickTime formats and allowed direct-to-edit workflows. Later models added to the range included the Alexa Plus, Alexa Studio and Alexa M, which was designed to get the camera closer to the action. The Alexa Plus 4:3, like the Alexa Studio, allowed the full area of the sensor to be used with anamorphic lenses.

The 16mm Arriflex 416 camera and Ultra Prime 16 lenses were used in the filming of the 2010 film Black Swan.

Arri announced a strategic collaboration with Zeiss and Fujinon in 2010 to create new lenses that incorporated enhanced electronic lens data transfer to simplify visual effects workflows in post-production. The Arri/Fujinon Alura Zooms were released that same year, while the Arri/Zeiss Master Anamorphic lens series was released in 2012.

In 2013, Arri created Arri Medical, a business unit that utilizes its camera technology for medical purposes. Apart from a medical imaging documentation service, it has developed a fully digital 3D surgical microscope called the Arriscope.

The Arri Alexa 65, released in 2014, was used in the filming of The Revenant as well as Mission: Impossible – Rogue Nation and Rogue One: A Star Wars Story. The Arri Amira camera was also released in 2014. In 2015, four of the five nominees for the cinematography category of the Academy Awards were filmed using the Arri Alexa.

Arri's subsidiary post-production and creative services company, Arri Film & TV, was renamed Arri Media in 2015 as part of a company restructuring. At NAB 2015, the SkyPanel LED fixtures were introduced by Arri. The SC60 and the SC30 have a full color tunable LED option.

In April 2016, Arri acquired the artemis and Trinity camera stabilizer systems developed by Curt O. Schaller from Sachtler (Vitec / Videndum). As a result, Arri became the exclusive seller of artemis and Trinity stabilizers. At NAB 2016, Arri unveiled its version of the Trinity camera stabilization system.

Under the leadership of Curt O. Schaller the second generation of Arri camera stabilization systems followed in 2022 with ARTEMIS 2 and TRINITY 2.

In 2023, ARRI established ARRI Solutions as a dedicated business unit under the leadership of Kevin Schwutke. With this move, ARRI responded to the growing global demand for virtual production solutions, system integration, and workflow development.

In 2025, Curt O. Schaller was awarded the Scientific and Engineering Award of the Academy of Motion Picture Arts and Sciences (AMPAS) for the concept, design and development of the TRINITY camera stabilization system (ARRI TRINITY 2). In 2026, Curt O. Schaller was also awarded the Engineering, Science & Technology Emmy Award of the Academy of Television Arts & Sciences (ATAS) for the development of the TRINITY camera stabilization system (ARRI TRINITY 2).

On April 14, 2026, after months of public speculation regarding the future of the company, it was announced that ARRI had been acquired by German communications executive Thomas Riedel (Riedel Communications), after having been privately owned and operated by the same family for 108 years.

== Mounts ==
Historically, Arri used three types of lens mounts. The mounts became popular and adapters for them had been made by other camera manufacturers.

Arri standard was a lens mount developed by Arri for use with both 16 mm and 35 mm movie cameras. Lenses are distinguished by a tab inside an outer ring. Because of the weak seating strength and ability of the aluminum mount to gradually become poorly seated, the stainless steel Arri bayonet mount superseded the Arri standard mount in 1965, debuting on the 16BL.

Arri bayonet was a lens mount developed by Arri for use with both 16 mm and 35 mm movie camera lenses. Lenses of this type are distinguished by "outer wings" which both control aperture and bayonet alignment, and are placed in the mount while two pressure tabs are simultaneously depressed at the side of the lens mount on the camera. These tabs provide a relatively strong locking mechanism which allows for higher quality lens seating than offered by the Arri standard mount. Debuting in 1965 with the 16BL, the Arri bayonet mount superseded the Arri standard mount, but cameras with the bayonet mount were also able to accommodate Arri standard lenses due to both mounts having the same flange focal distance and diameter. However, cameras with Arri standard mounts were unable to fit lenses with Arri bayonet mounts, due to the locking mechanism. The bayonet mount began to be superseded around 1980 by the Arri PL mount, which has since become an overwhelmingly predominant mount for most modern cameras, along with Panavision and their PV mount.

Arri PL is a lens mount developed by Arri for use with both 16 mm and 35 mm movie cameras. The PL stands for "positive lock". It is the successor mount to the Arri bayonet; unlike the bayonet mount, however, it is incompatible with older Arri-mount lenses, due to the larger diameter. Originally developed for 35-mm cameras, it became popular on the 16-mm cameras as well, mostly due to the advantage of using the same lenses on both camera packages.

== ARRI rosette-type mount ==
An ARRI rosette-type mount is a standard mechanical connector used in film and video production to attach accessories to a camera. Accessories attached include thing such as handgrips, shoulder rigs, extension arms, and monitors, which are attached to camera cages, baseplates, and support systems via the mount.

The mount features a circular disc with interlocking radial teeth that mesh together with a matching rosette on the accessory. The industry-standard ARRI rosette measures 31.8 mm in diameter, contains 60 teeth, and uses an M6 central threaded screw or hole to lock the two pieces together. The toothed design allows a user to rotate and lock the accessory at virtually any angle (360 degrees), then tighten it down securely so it will not slip or twist during use. Modern variants include additions to help prevent twisting, including locating pins (such as ARRI-style anti-twist pins) or dual-screw plates to prevent the mount from rotating or loosening on the camera body.

== Awards ==
Arri Awards
Award	Presented to	Product	Year
Academy of Motion Picture Arts and Sciences Scientific and Engineering Award	Arnold & Richter KG	ARRIFLEX 35mm	1966
Academy of Motion Picture Arts and Sciences Scientific and Engineering Award	Joachim Gerb and Erich Kästner of the Arnold & Richter Company	ARRIFLEX 35BL	1973
Academy Award of Merit	August Arnold and Erich Kästner of Arnold & Richter, GmbH	The concept and engineering of the first operational 35mm handheld, spinning-mirror reflex motion picture camera	1982
Academy of Motion Picture Arts and Sciences Scientific and Engineering Award	Carl Zeiss Company and Arnold & Richter	Zeiss high-speed 35mm motion picture camera lenses	1987
Academy of Motion Picture Arts and Sciences Scientific and Engineering Award	Arnold & Richter engineer Otto Blaschek and Arriflex Corporation	ARRIFLEX 35 III	1988
Academy of Motion Picture Arts and Sciences Scientific and Engineering Award	Engineering Department of Arnold & Richter	ARRIFLEX 35BL 4S	1990
Academy of Motion Picture Arts and Sciences Scientific and Engineering Award	Arnold & Richter, Otto Blaschek and the Engineering Department of ARRI Austria	ARRIFLEX 765	1992
Gordon E. Sawyer Academy Award	Erich Kästner, Chief Design Engineer at Arnold & Richter from 1932 to 1982	Technical contributions to the industry	1992
Academy of Motion Picture Arts and Sciences Scientific and Engineering Award	Arnold & Richter Cine Technik	The development of the ARRIFLEX 535 series of cameras	1995
Academy of Motion Picture Arts and Sciences Scientific and Engineering Award	Arnold & Richter Cine Technik and ARRI USA, Inc.	ARRIFLEX 435	1998
Academy of Motion Picture Arts and Sciences Scientific and Engineering Award	Arnold & Richter Cine Technik and Carl Zeiss Company	ARRI/ZEISS Variable Prime lenses	1998
Academy of Motion Picture Arts and Sciences Scientific and Engineering Award	Franz Kraus, Johannes Steurer and Wolfgang Riedel	ARRILASER film recorder	2001
Television Academy of Arts and Sciences Emmy Award	Arri	Over 50 years of outstanding achievement in engineering development	2002
Academy of Motion Picture Arts and Sciences Academy Award of Merit	Arnold & Richter Cine Technik and Panavision	Continuing development and innovation in the design and manufacturing of advanced camera systems	2002
Academy of Motion Picture Arts and Sciences Scientific and Technical Award	Klemens Kehrer, Josef Handler, Thomas Smidek and Marc Shipman-Mueller	ARRIFLEX 235	2006
Academy of Motion Picture Arts and Sciences Scientific and Technical Award	Walter Trauninger and Ernest Tschida	ARRI WRC wireless remote lens control system	2006
Academy of Motion Picture Arts and Sciences Scientific and Engineering Award	Erwin Melzner, Volker Schumacher and Timo Mueller	ARRIMAX 18/12 lighting fixture	2008
Academy of Motion Picture Arts and Sciences Scientific and Engineering Award	Michael Cieslinski, Dr. Reimar Lenz and Bernd Brauner	ARRISCAN film scanner	2009
Academy of Motion Picture Arts and Sciences Scientific and Technical Award	Juergen Noffke and Uwe Weber	ARRI/ZEISS Master Prime lenses	2011
Academy of Motion Picture Arts and Sciences Scientific and Technical Award	Franz Kraus, Johannes Steurer, Wolfgang Riedel	ARRILASER film recorder	2011
Academy of Motion Picture Arts and Sciences Scientific and Technical Award	Arri	ALEXA camera system	2017
Deutscher Filmpreis (Lola)	Arri	Special honor for extraordinary technical achievement	2017
Television Academy of Arts and Sciences Emmy Award	Arri	ALEXA camera system	2017
Academy of Motion Picture Arts and Sciences Scientific and Technical Award	Curt O. Schaller	ARRI TRINITY 2	2025
Television Academy of Arts and Sciences Emmy Award	Curt O. Schaller	ARRI TRINITY 2	2026

== Products ==
Camera lines

- Kinarri 35 (1924)
- Kinarri 16 (1928)
- Arriflex 35 (1937)
- Arriflex 35 II (1946)
- Arriflex 16ST (1952)
- Arriflex 35 IIA (1953)
- Arriflex 35 IIB (1959)
- Arriflex 16M (1960)
- Arriflex 35 IIC (1963)
- Arriflex 16BL (1965)
- Arritechno 35 (1970)
- Arriflex 35BL (1972)
- Arriflex 16SR (1975)
- Arriflex 35BL II (1975)
- Arriflex 35 III (1979)
- Arriflex 35BL III (1980)
- Arriflex 35 IIIC (1982)
- Arriflex 16SR2 (1982)
- Arriflex 35BL 4 (1986)
- Arriflex 35BL 4S (1988)
- Arriflex 765 (1989)
- Arriflex 535 (1990)
- Arriflex 535 B (1992)
- Arriflex 16SR 3 (1992)
- Arriflex 435 (1994)
- Arriflex 435 ES (1995)
- Arricam Studio and Lite (2000)
- Arriflex 435 Advanced (2001)
- Arriflex 235 (2003)
- Arriflex 435 Xtreme (2004)
- Arriflex D-20 (2005)
- Arriflex 416 (2006)
- Arriflex 416 Plus (2006)
- Arriflex 416 Plus HS (2008)
- Arriflex D-21 (2008)
- Arri Alexa (2010)
- Arri Alexa XT (2013)
- Arri Amira (2013)
- Arri Alexa 65 (2014)
- Arri Alexa Mini (2015)
- Arri Alexa SXT (2016)
- Arri Alexa LF (2018)
- Arri Alexa Mini LF (2019)
- Arri Alexa 35 (2022)
- Arri Alexa 265 (2024)
- Arri Alexa 35 Xtreme (2025)

Lighting

- Arri Fresnel (1937)
- Arri Gigant (1952)
- Arrisonne 2000 (1972)
- Arri Apollo (1979)
- Arri Studio (1988)
- Arri Compact Daylight (1991)
- Arrisun 40/25 (1992)
- Arrilux Pocket PAR (1996)
- ARRIMAX 18/12 (2005)
- Arri M40 (2011)
- Arri L7 LED Fresnel (2011)
- Arri SkyPanel S60-C (2015)
- Arri SkyPanel S120-C
- Arri SkyPanel S360-C
- Arri SkyPanel S30-C
- Arri Orbiter (2019)
- Stellar Lighting Control App

Camera stabilizers

- ARRI ARTEMIS 2
- ARRI TRINITY 2
- ARRI Trinity (1)

Film recorder

- Arrilaser film recorder, used for film-out

Film scanner

- Arriscan

== Corporate espionage ==
In 2011, it was alleged that Michael Bravin, an executive of the US-based subsidiary Arri Inc., had unlawfully accessed a rival company's email account. A suit was brought before a US court and in September 2011, Bravin entered a guilty plea. Arri Inc. denied knowledge or gains from Bravin's actions, and a separate lawsuit against the company was dropped as a result of an out-of-court settlement.

== See also ==
- Carl Zeiss AG
- Panavision
- Red Digital Cinema
- Comparison of movie cameras

== Sources ==
- Hart, D. (2012). The Camera Assistant: A Complete Professional Handbook. Taylor & Francis. ISBN 978-1-136-04913-2.
- Malkiewicz, Kris; Mullen, M. David (2009-12-01). "Lens Mounts". Cinematography: Third Edition. Simon and Schuster. ISBN 978-1-4391-0562-7.
