= Arriflex 16ST =

Motion picture camera

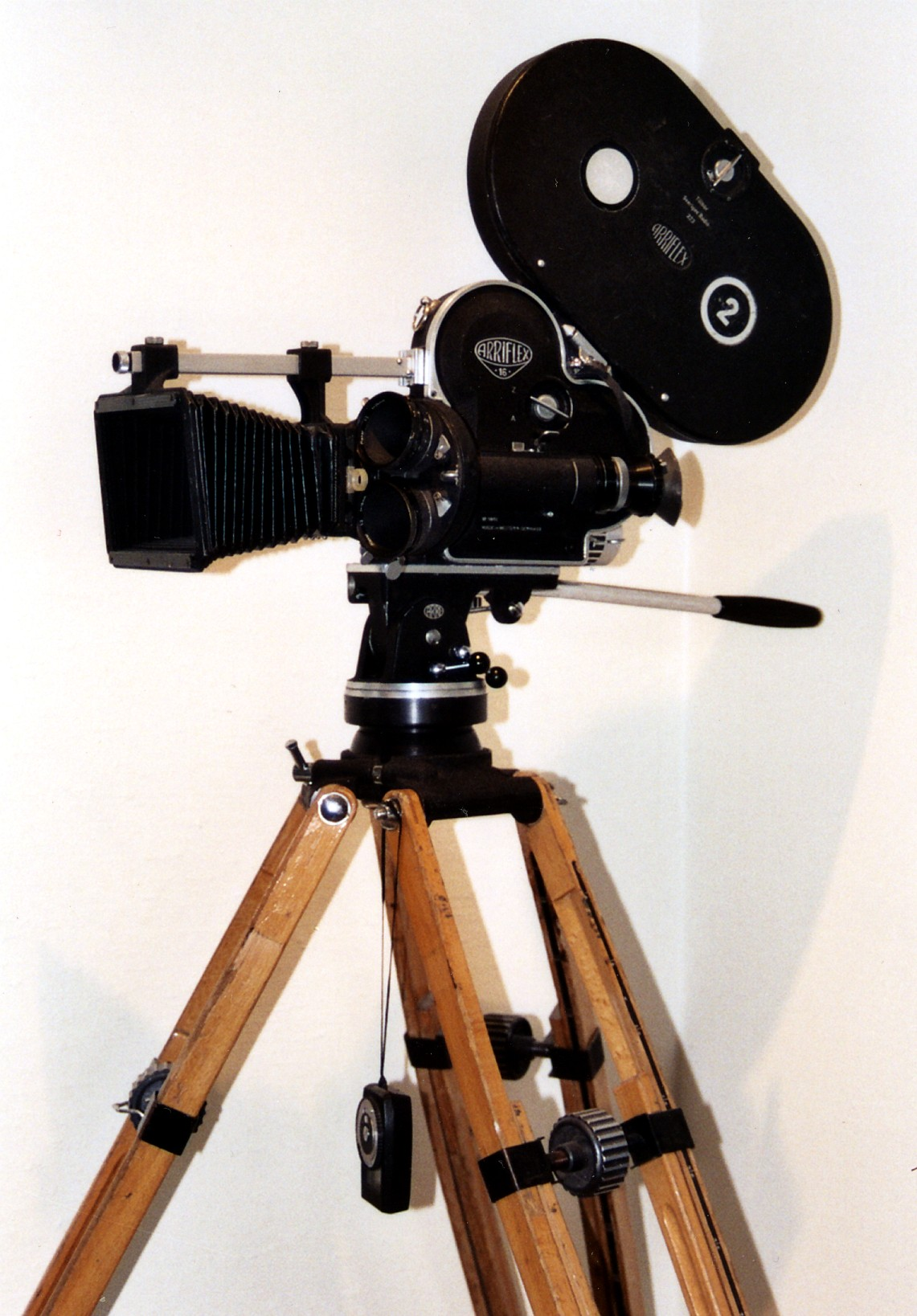
ARRI 16 ST with 400ft magazine

The Arriflex 16ST, also Arriflex 16S, is a 16mm MOS production motion picture camera released in 1952 by ARRI. The camera utilizes a voltage of 8.4 volts DC

== Function ==
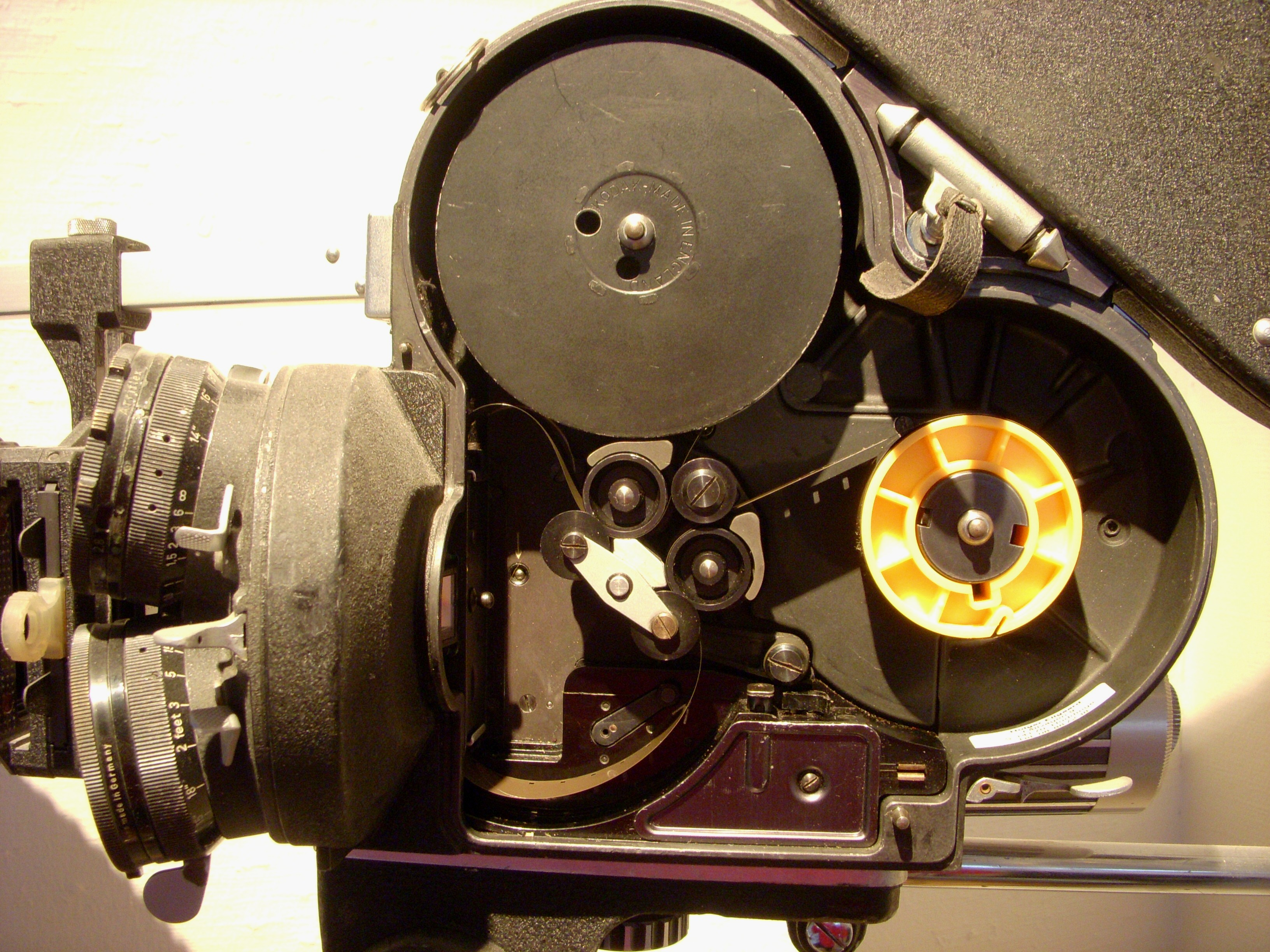
ST with open door

Like earlier models, the ARRI 16ST was built around the spinning reflex twin-bladed "butterfly" mirror shutter designed by Erich Kästner, chief engineer at Arnold & Richter Cine Technik (ARRI), Arri Group, set at 45 degrees horizontally to the lens axis. It uses a 3-lens turret with ARRI standard mounts. The viewfinder is located on the gate door. The design is very similar to the Arriflex 35.

The Arriflex 16ST can load 100ft daylight spools internally and a 400ft external magazine can be attached to the top. The camera is driven by a 12V crystal control motor, which can be controlled on the right side. It can record between 8 and 48 fps. The motor also has a reverse mode, which can be used for double exposure for example.

The standard matte box is adjustable in length to fit the different focal lengths of the lenses.

This 16mm camera was one of ARRI's most popular designs; over 20,000 were sold. The "ST" (for standard) was added later to distinguish it from other 16mm Arri cameras.

=== Arriflex 16M ===
The Arriflex 16M is a model released in 1960, similar from a technical point of view to the 16ST, but only using 200ft, 400ft, and 1200ft magazines.
