= Arriflex 35 =

German 35mm reflex motion picture camera (1937)

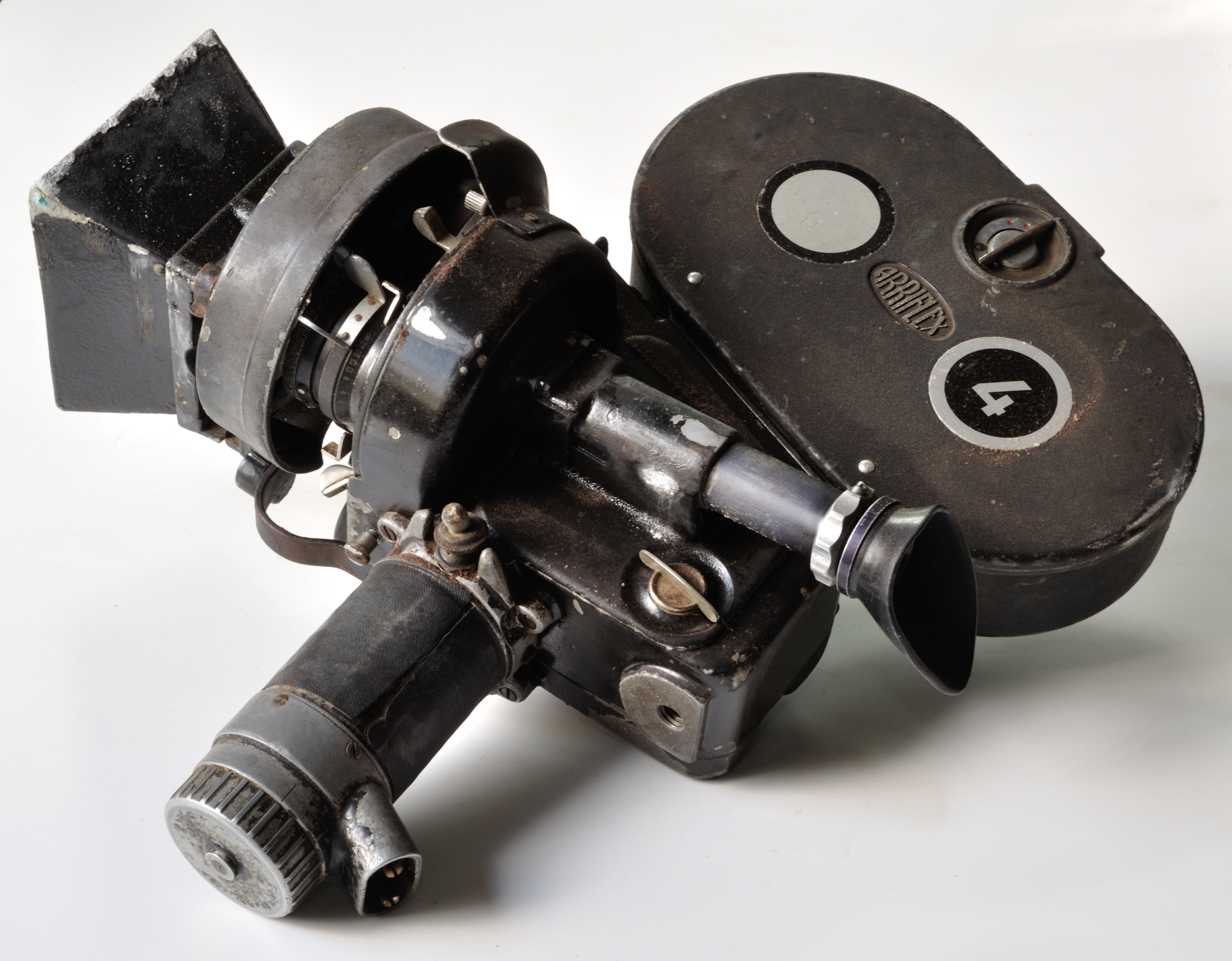
Arriflex 35mm movie camera

The Arriflex 35 was the first reflex 35mm production motion picture camera, released by German manufacturer Arri in 1937.

== Function ==
It was built around the spinning reflex twin-bladed "butterfly" mirror shutter designed by Erich Kästner, chief engineer at Arnold & Richter Cine Technik (ARRI), Arri Group, set at 45 degrees horizontally to the lens axis. This mirror reflex system was invented in 1931. Modern standard models have a maximum shutter exposure opening of 165 degrees, (not 180 degrees as claimed in Arri manuals), the 35 IIC-BV model having a variable shutter. The mirror shutter allows the camera operator to see a viewfinder image equal to the recorded picture, without parallax, although there is noticeable image flicker in the viewfinder when the camera is running, caused by the two open exposure segments of the mirror shutter.

The camera utilizes a three lens turret with three aluminum Arri lens mounts (later 35 IIC/B with one stainless steel bayonet mount and two aluminum Arri mounts), and is capable of frame rates up to 80 frames per second with an accessory speed unit. Film magazines are for 200 ft or 400 ft loads. The DC motor is mounted downwards as a handgrip. Later flat base DC motor mount units were developed e.g. by the Cine 60 company, allowing the camera to have a lower profile, where the motor is mounted on the side of the camera body vertically upwards, allowing the camera to be mounted on standard tripod heads without a special head accommodating the handgrip motor, and providing a more compact profile for 'blimping'.

== History ==
It is still used extensively in motion pictures for sequences without synchronous sound – "motor only sync" – and unique camera movement, e.g. on Steadicam. It was widely used with 200 ft loads (the smaller 200 ft magazine was in production at that time) as a 'battlefield camera' for the German Wehrmacht during World War II for collecting battlefront intelligence, (e.g. for analyzing weapons effectiveness), for training films and for use in propaganda cinema films.

== Models ==
=== Arriflex 35 ===
The Arriflex 35 was introduced as a handheld newsreel camera at the Leipzig Trade Fare in 1937. Although originally intended, the camera was just too late to be used at Leni Riefenstahl's Olympia I & II, therefore she shot on a Parvo camera. The US army captured some models and brought this camera to the US in the 1940s, where it served as a prototype for the almost identical Cineflex PH 330.

Due to its importance during World war II footage, Arriflex 35 cameras were later used in the Nuremberg Trials.The original Arriflex 35 had three Arri standard mounts on a rotating turret. The viewfinder was a fixed tube on the camera door. It used both 200 ft and 400 ft magazines.

The first American feature film made using a captured Arriflex 35 was Dark Passage by Delmer Daves.

=== Arriflex 35 II ===
This model was released in 1946 and had three Arri standard mounts. It could also load 400 ft magazines and had a simple eccentric screw pull down mechanism. ARRI began importing this camera to the US in 1947. The Arriflex 35 became a commonly used camera among New Wave filmmakers.

==== Arriflex 35 IIA ====
Introduced in 1953, the Arriflex 35 IIA featured a more robust steel film gate. It also used a 180° shutter made possible by a more efficient cardioid cam movement design.

==== Arriflex 35 IIB ====
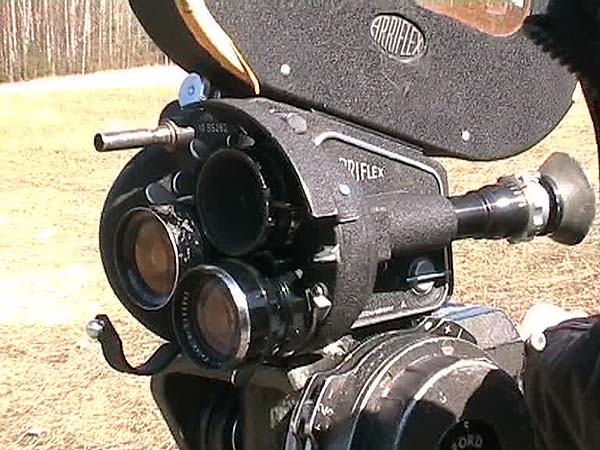
Arriflex 35B

Released in 1958, this model reduced the shutter angle to 165° and added some improvements to the viewfinder.

==== Arriflex 35 IIC ====
The Arriflex 35 IIC was introduced in 1963, and had a larger ground glass and a movable viewfinder. It also allowed shooting anamorphic and seeing a desqueezed frame. It became a film production standard. It originally came with three Standard Mounts, while later models (after 1965) had the option of Bayonet mounts. After 1980 many were converted to hard front with a single PL mount.

Stanley Kubrick used the Arriflex 35 IIC on A Clockwork Orange. The Pan Arri 35 IIC had one Panavision compatible lens mount and was used for Star Wars: A New Hope.

Some Arriflex 35 IIC were used until the 2010s, for example in Savages in 2012.

=== Arriflex 35 III ===
Arri introduced the Arriflex III, in 1979, as a successor to the Arriflex 35 IIC. The camera used a single registration pin, and had a shutter capable of being adjusted from 15 to 135 degrees (in 15 degree increments). By using a special key, one could also change the shutter opening to 180, 172.8, and 144 degrees.

The camera's use of a crystal controlled motor lead to more stable frame rates compared to the Arriflex 35 IIC, and the camera also featured a brighter orientable viewfinder. The Arriflex 35 IIIC's 60m and 150m magazines (both designed for forward and reverse running) were identical to those used by the Arriflex 35 IIC, however there were also 300m magazines and 150m shoulder magazines, made for the IIIC using synthetic material in order to reduce weight.

The Arriflex 35 III was used by James Cameron in films such as The Terminator and True Lies, as well as by Steven Spielberg in Jaws.

==== Arriflex 35 IIIC ====
The Arriflex 35 IIIC was released in 1982. It removed the turret and only featured a single PL mount, had a crystal sync handgrip motor with 12 V and 5–50 fps, forward and reverse. This camera was not as successful as the Arriflex 35 IIC, and only a few models are still available.

The camera was used to film parts of GoldenEye and The Fifth Element in the late 90s, and was later used in 2005 in Jarhead.

=== Variants and successors ===
In 1972, Arri first released a blimped version of the Arriflex 35 for sync sound shooting, in the Arriflex 35BL. This was replaced in 1990 with the Arriflex 535, with the MOS camera Arriflex 435 being released in 1995 as a continuation of the main Arriflex 35 line. In 2000 the 535 was superseded by the Arricam line, with the more compact MOS camera Arriflex 235 coming out in 2003.
