= Arriflex 35BL =

Series of 35mm film cameras

The Arriflex 35BL is a 35mm motion picture camera released by ARRI in 1972 as part of its Arriflex 35 line.

== Function ==
The Arriflex 35BL was the first silent 35mm camera (BL stands for blimped). It uses a fixed butterfly reflex shutter, which gave the cinematographer an exact representation of the recorded frame. It recorded up to 100 frames per second, which was revolutionary in documenting sporting events. It uses a dual registration pin system. It also has an odometer-styled analogue footage counter. The camera uses both 400 feet (120 m) and 1,200 feet (370 m) magazines.

== History ==
The development of the 35BL began in 1966, since there was no handholdable, silent, reflex 35 mm camera at that time. The release of this camera, together with the Panaflex Lightweight released in 1975, changed the filmmaking process profoundly and made big camera setups like the Mitchell BNCR obsolete. The Arriflex 35BL was released just in time to document the 1972 Summer Olympics, in Arri's hometown Munich. This led to a huge boost in popularity of this camera. It was also one of Arri's longest running product lines, being produced from 1972 until 1990, when the Arriflex 535 replaced it, followed by the Arricam system in 2000.

The 35BL series has been used on many notable films, starting with Across 110th Street, then Barry Lyndon, Taxi Driver, The Shining, and Return of the Jedi.

== Models ==
=== Arriflex 35BL I ===
- released in 1972
- up to 100 fps
- Arri bayonet lens mount
- external blimps for certain lenses, like the Zeiss Super Speed Primes

=== Arriflex 35BL II ===
- released in 1975, alongside the Arriflex 16SR
- only up to 50 fps, new motor with higher torque, overall more silent

=== Arriflex 35BL III ===
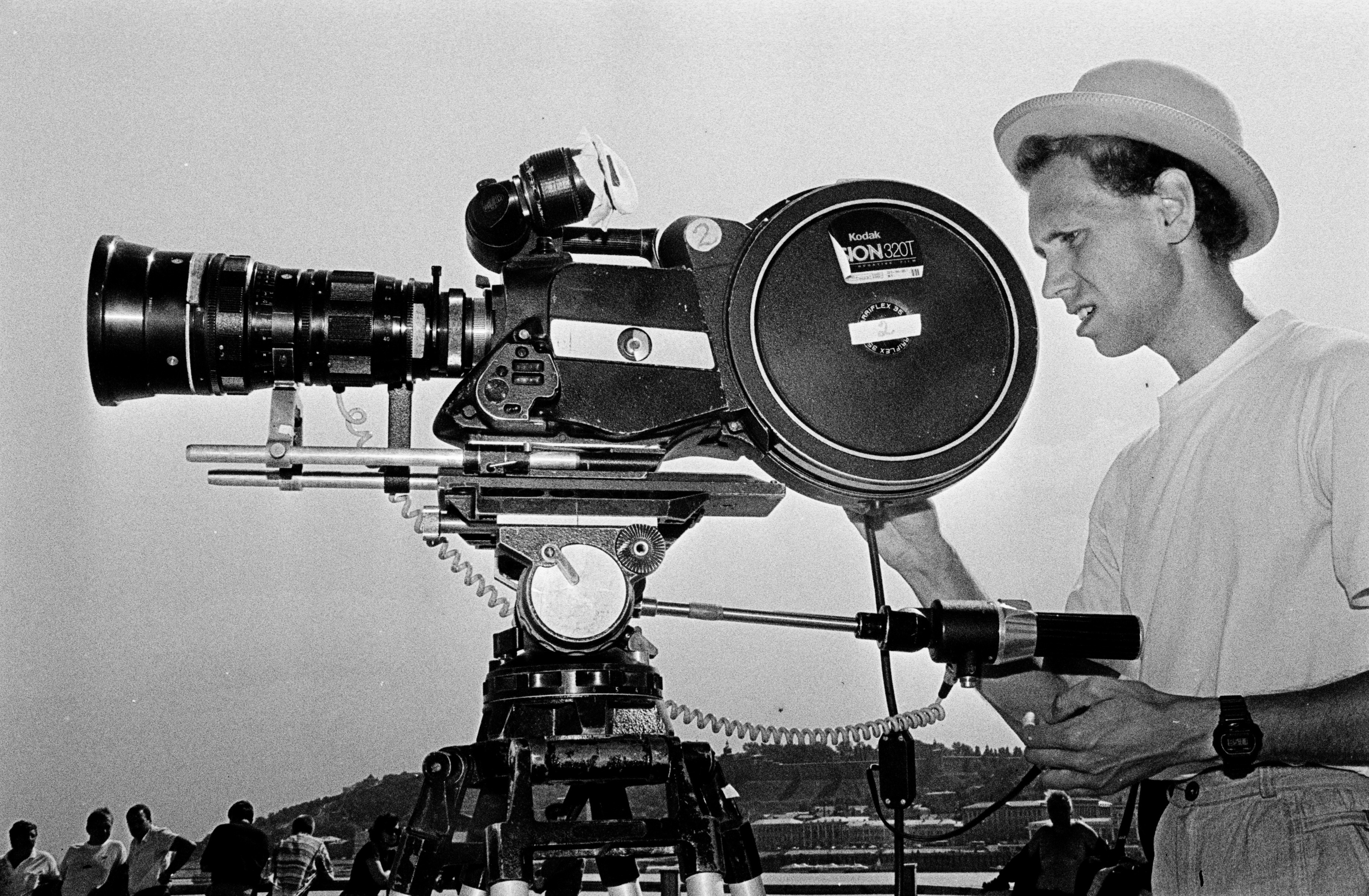
Camera Assistant with an Arriflex 35BL III on the set of Chinese Tea Set

- released in 1980
- uses the new acoustic isolated PL Mount, which made lens blimps obsolete
- new 180° half moon shutter replaced the bowtie shutter, Shutter can be manually adjusted
- similar eyepiece to the one used in the Arri 35 III is installed

=== Arriflex 35BL 4 ===
- released in 1986
- new viewfinder system, brighter image in the eyepiece, Arriglow is introduced, which illuminates the frame lines, to make framing of dark scenes easier.
- only up to 40 fps, but sound level reduction to 22 dBA.

=== Arriflex 35BL 4S ===
- released in 1988
- new film movement block, even quieter operating noise
- discontinued in 1990 with the release of the Arriflex 535
