= Arriscope =

Arriscope may refer to:

- Arriscope (lens), a line of anamorphic lenses for Arriflex
- Arriscope (Surgical Microscope), a fully digital surgical microscope developed by Arri
