= Arriflex 416 =

16 mm movie camera line

Arriflex 416 is a motion picture camera product line created by Arri in 2006. This camera line was introduced in large part to accommodate new lenses of larger diameter that physically interfered with the Arri 16 SR3 viewfinder. The 416 camera series is designed for 16mm filmmaking in the Super 16 format. The 416 series has some features that are derived from Arri's 35mm cameras. The 416 series is compatible with some 35mm camera accessories, such as PL-mount lenses, base plates, matte boxes, follow focus units, and more.

The 416 is used on movie and TV drama productions such as Bronson, Canterbury's Law, The Walking Dead, Chuck, the 2008 movies Ivory and The Wave, Black Swan, Dhobi Ghat and Fruitvale Station. It was also used on the 2015 films Suffragette, and Carol, as well as the 2016 war dramas Anthropoid and ’76.

== Arriflex 416 ==
Introduced in 2006.

- Super 16 format.
- PL-mount lens mount.
- 45° to 180° shutter as 35-style camera.
- 35-style viewfinder.
- Use same video-assist system as Arricam, Arriflex 435 Xtreme, and Arriflex 235.
- Running speed: 1 to 75 frame/s

== Arriflex 416 Plus ==
Introduced with 416 at the same time. It has the same specifications as the 416, but it also includes

- Integrated accessory electronics and radio for wireless remote control

== Arriflex 416 Plus HS ==
Introduced in April 2008. Included specifications from 416 Plus, and provided high speed function for slow-motion capturing.

- Running speed: 1 to 150 frame/s
