= Arriflex 435 =

35 mm movie camera line

- Variant models: 435 (manual shutter), 435ES, 435 Advanced, 435 Xtreme
- Manufacturer: Arri
- Introduced: 1995 (435 and ES), 2001 (Advanced), 2004 (Xtreme)
- Gauge: 35 mm
- Weight: 6.5 kg/14.3 lbs without magazine
- Movement: Five link with dual registration pins and pulldown claws, 3 or 4-perf pulldown
- Speed: 1–150 frames per second, forward and reverse, expanded to 0.1–150 for Advanced and Xtreme. Crystal accurate to 0.001 frame/s. Integrated capping shutter for single frame or intervalometer functions.
- Aperture size: .945" x .710"
- Aperture plate: removable
- Motor: DC with quartz crystal control
- Operating noise level: MOS
- Indicators: speed, run, counter (ft or m), shutter angle, time code (user bit and sensitivity level), voltage, incorrect movement, asynchronous speed, low battery, film end
- Lens mount: Arri PL (Super 35 compatible)
- Lens control: Arri-style follow focus. Integrated Lens Data System (LDS) and Lens Control System (LCS) in Advanced and Xtreme models; may be added as accessory for manual and ES.
- Shutter: reflex mirror; manual model stops at 11.2°, 22.5°, 30°, 45°, 60°, 75°, 90°, 105°, 120°, 135°, 144°, 172.8° and 180°, all other models can be adjusted continuously between 11.2° and 180° while either running or in standby mode
- Viewfinder: covers Super 35, rotates 360° and to left or right of camera with manual adjustment to maintain upright image. Can be used with either eye. Anamorphic switch available. Standard 80/20 beamsplitter, but entire viewfinder and beamsplitter can be replaced with 100% video tap for Steadicam or remote rigging.
- Video assist: Integrated Video System (IVS) or IVS-2; Standard 0.5 inch CCD camera mountable through C-mount
- Ground glass: Interchangeable. Arriglow module available.
- Magazines: top-mounted, available in 400 ft (122 m), 1000 ft (300 m), and 400 ft (120 m) Steadicam sizes. 1,000 ft (300 m) mag has torque motors. Older fixed-loop mags from Arri III and Arri II can be used to 120fps.
- Magazine loading: fixed-loop displacement mags, takes up emulsion in (9P design)
- Film cores: standard cores
- Matte boxes: Arriflex MB or LMB models, 19 mm rods
- Electronic accessories: 24 V, 3/5 A and 12 V, 3/5 A ports; shutter timing shift box (TSB), handcrank extension (HC), external display (EXD), zoom control (ZMU), wireless remote system (WRS), wireless remote control (WRC), remote control unit (RCU), universal motor controller (UMC), lens data archive (LDA), heated eyepiece (HE), lens data mount (LDM), integrated video system (IVS), Varicon flashing unit, rain deflector, Arrimotion data box, external sync unit (ESU), cine tape measure, accessory power box (APB), remote switch (RS), onboard video monitor, functional expansion module (FEM), motion control interface (MCI), CHS module for 130+ frame/s, lens data display (LDD)
- Optical accessories: shift and tilt lens system, eyepiece leveller, pentafinder, wide angle eyepiece
- Other accessories: lightweight follow focus (LFF), lightweight support rods, third party accessories
- Batteries: 24V
- Environment protection: third party covers and housings, rain deflector
- Camera support: Arrihead, bridge plate, handgrip, shoulder set, shoulder cushion, underslung bracket for Steadicam

The Arriflex 435 is a movie camera product line created by Arri in 1995 to replace the Arriflex 35-III line. The number reflects its position as a successor camera to the Arri III and the fact that it is designed for 35 mm film. The 435 cameras are specifically designed as MOS cameras, which means that they are conventionally considered to be too loud to record usable location sound. However, this also frees the camera up to be optimized for non-sync sound uses, particularly any filming which either doesn't require sound or shooting at non-sync speed, shooting in reverse, or ramping between different speeds. As such, its potential applications are widespread, and thus it is regularly used on music videos, commercials, second unit work on features, special effects work, and motion control, among other usage. Rival Panavision even owns more 435s for rental than Arri's own hire houses; Panavisions, however, can be converted to Pan-Arri 435s where they are modified to accept Panavision lenses and accessories. In recognition of the achievements of the 435 system, AMPAS awarded Arri a Scientific and Engineering Academy Award in 1999.

== Models and technical data ==
(Most of the specifications noted apply forward to all successive models unless noted otherwise.)

=== 435 and 435ES ===
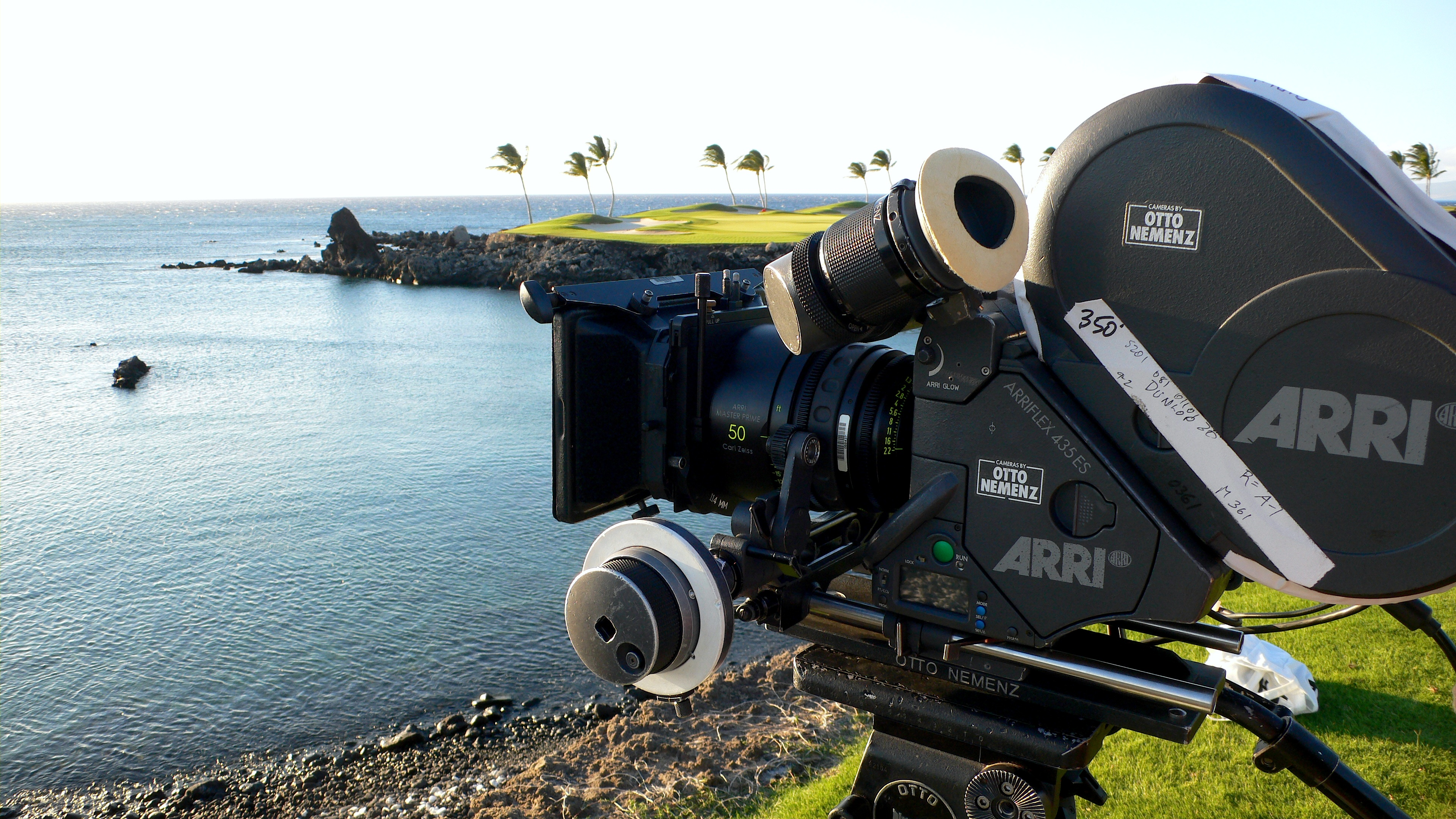
Arriflex 435ES

Arri debuted two models of the 435 in 1995: the 435 and 435ES. The latter is suffixed ES to denote electronic shutter capabilities; this means that the shutter angle is able to be continuously electronically adjusted, even while the camera is running, and set to any angle within a specific range (11.2° to 180°) to a great deal of precision (0.1°). Otherwise, they are identical in all other respects. These include a standard Arri PL mount; compatibility with Super 35; frame rates adjustable both in forward and reverse between 1 and 150 frames per second, accurate to .001 frames per second; fixed-loop magazines and backwards compatibility with older Arri magazines; compatibility with some Arriflex 535 accessories; timecode capability; and a highly flexible viewfinder and video-tap system which could be switched out with other video tap options.

Other accessories and capabilities were modularly added in successive years, including Steadicam magazines (1996), an integrated video assist (1997), 1,000-foot (300 m) magazines and single frame control (1998), and 3-perf movement (2000).

=== 435 Advanced ===
The 435 Advanced was unveiled in 2001 and was the result of several years of feedback from users of the 435 system. While not only making standard some of the improved accessories made available in the interim, the 435 Advanced added more features to increase the versatility of the camera. These included a lower minimum frame rate of 0.1 frames per second, motion control integration with Arrimotion, and LDS (Lens Data System) lens recognition capability through electronic sensors.

=== 435 Xtreme ===
A new FEM (Functional Expansion Module) was added in 2003 to increase the camera's electronic feature set. Arri integrated this into the new 435 Xtreme, which was released in 2004. The new functions included faster ramping speed capability, a wider ramping range which could go down to 0.1 frames per second, further motion control interface abilities, integrated lens electronics, and integrated wireless radio signalling.

Three more accessories were released in 2005, exclusively for the 435 Advanced and 435 Xtreme: a hand-crank extension, a timing shift box to offset the phasing, and a remote LCD control panel designed for use on the "dumb side" of the camera.
