= Sound on tape =

Captured audio recordings

SOT is an acronym for the phrase sound on tape. It refers to any audio recorded on analog or digital video formats. It is used in scriptwriting for television productions and filmmaking to indicate the portions of the production that will use room tone or other audio from the time of recording, as opposed to audio recorded later (studio voice-over, Foley, etc.).

In broadcast journalism, SOT is generally considered to be audio captured from an individual who is on camera, like an interviewee and may also be referred to as a soundbite.

== See also ==
- Filmmaking
- MOS (filmmaking)
- Sound-on-film
