= Univex Mercury =

The 1938 Univex Mercury was an unusual half frame 35 mm camera from The Universal Camera Corporation.

It was the first camera with any kind of hot shoe connector, and had a distinctive profile due to a large dome protruding from the top of the main body to accommodate its 1/1000 sec rotary disc shutter. It used Universal #200 film, which was only made prior to WWII.
