= Arriscope (medicine) =

Digital operating microscope

Arriscope is a fully digital operating microscope delivering high-definition output streams in 3D and is developed and manufactured by Arri. The Arriscope has been presented to the public in a prototype version in May 2013 on the 84th Annual Meeting of the German Society of Oto-Rhino-Laryngology, Head and Neck Surgery. A release date was not published yet.

== Technology ==
The microscope is based on the famous Arri Alexa camera system and its stereoscopic optics and the led illumination are specially designed to match the camera sensor specifications. The camera system is carried by a balanced 6-axis stand with pneumatic-driven breaks. The camera itself produces two full-HD streams that can be displayed on electronic binoculars and also on a 3D monitor with polarization glasses. Further specifications have not been released yet as they might change in the final product.

== Potential advantages over an optical system ==
In contrast to conventional optical microscopes it enables patients, students and staff to see precisely the same view as the surgeon. Moreover, the same quality images can be recorded for documentation and educative purposes.
