= Erich Kästner (camera designer) =

German cinema pioneer (1911–2005)

Erich Kurt Kästner (5 April 1911 – 31 January 2005) was a German movie camera designer. He was born in Jena.

During his work for ARRI, he invented the spinning mirror reflex shutter for film cameras, which was first used in the Arriflex 35 in 1937. It allows the operator to have a viewfinder image equal to the recorded picture.

Kästner received a Gordon E. Sawyer Award in 1992 and an Oscar in 1973 (Class II technical award [plaque]) and 1982 (Academy Award of Merit [statuette]). In 1994 he won the Bavarian Film Awards Honorary Award.

He died in Penzberg.
