= Arriflex 535 =

35 mm movie camera line

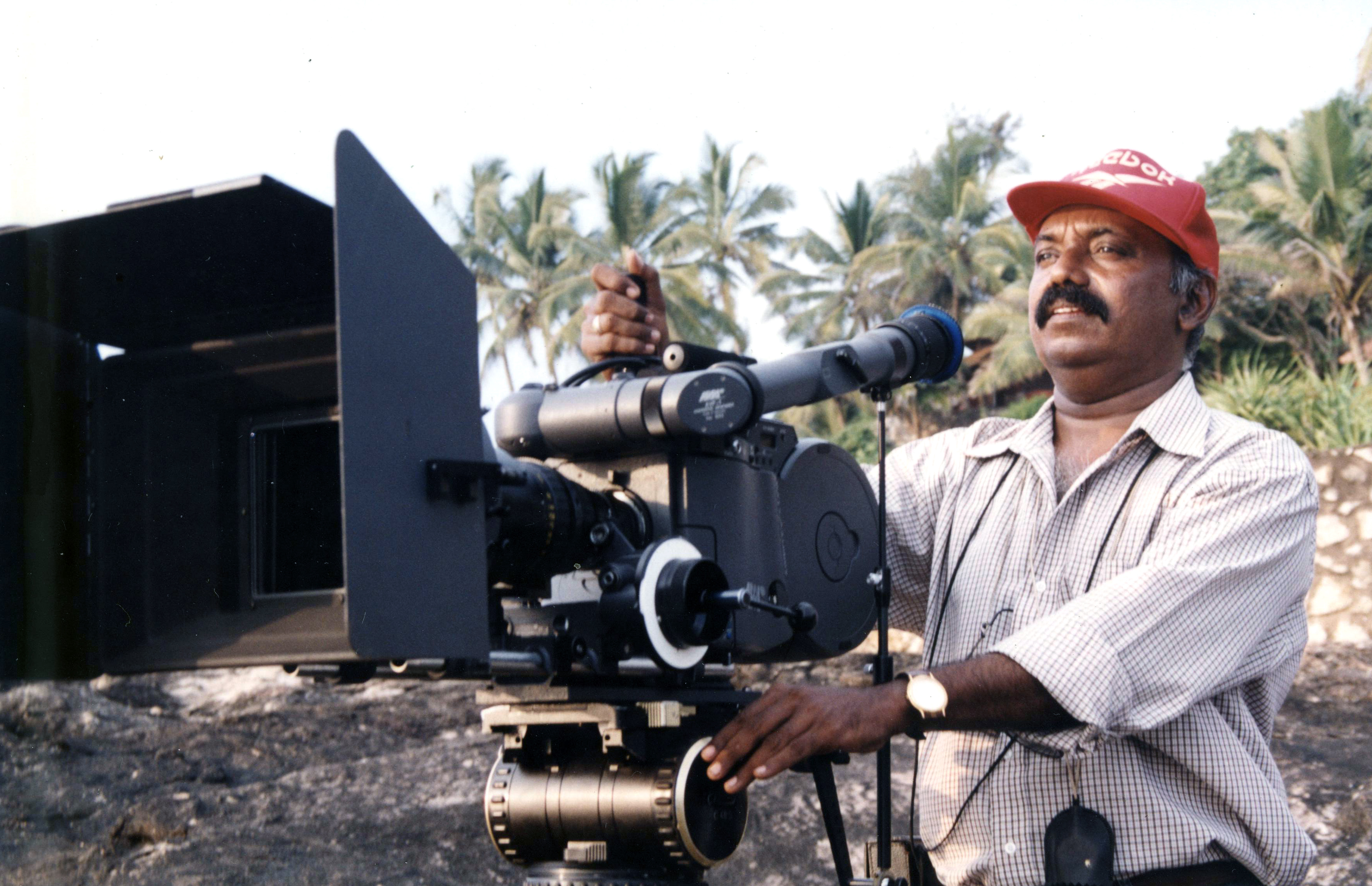
- Indian cinematographer Ramachandra Babu with Arriflex 535B Camera
- Variant models: 535 (aka 535A); 535B
- Manufacturer: Arri
- Introduced: 1990 (535); 1992 (535B)
- Gauge: 35 mm
- Weight: 7.7 kg/17.0 lbs without magazine
- Movement: Seven link with dual registration pins and pulldown claws, for 35 mm negativefilm DIN 15 501
- Speed: 3-60 frames per second, forward and reverse. Crystal accurate to 0.0001 frame/s.
- Aperture size: .945" x .710"
- Aperture plate: removable
- Motor: DC with quartz crystal control
- Indicators: speed, run, counter (ft or m), shutter angle, time code (user bit and sensitivity level), voltage, incorrect movement, asynchronous speed, low battery, film end
- Lens mount: Arri PL (Super 35 compatible)
- Lens control: Arri-style follow focus.
- Shutter: reflex mirror; manual model stops at 15°, 30°, 45°, 60°, 75°, 90°, 105°, 120°, 135°, 150°, 144°, 165°, 172.8°, 180°.
- Video assist: Integrated Video System (IVS)
- Magazines: rear-mounted, available in 400 ft (122 m) coaxial, 1000 ft (300 m) coaxial, and 400 ft (120 m) displacement Steadicam sizes.
- Magazine loading: Coaxial-type magazine
- Film cores: standard cores
- Batteries: 24V

The Arriflex 535 is a movie camera product line created by Arri in 1990 to replace the Arriflex 35BL line.

As such, its potential applications are widespread, and thus it is regularly used as a primary camera on feature films, second unit work on features, on music videos, commercials, special effects work and motion control, among other usage. Before the introduction of the Arricam System in 2000, the 535 was one of the most popular 35 mm sync-sound movie camera in usage, due to its wide range of production adoption, intuitive design, high reliability, and retail availability. In recognition of the achievements of the 535 system, AMPAS awarded Arri a Scientific and Engineering Academy Award in 1995. The original variant was capable of between three and fifty frames per second.

== Arriflex 535B ==
Variation of the 535, introduced in 1992. One of the main advantages is the higher frame rate of sixty frames per second.

Until he switched over to the digital Arri Alexa line of cameras, the 535 had been the choice camera of cinematographer Roger Deakins for much of his career.
