= Arriflex 16SR =

1975 German motion picture camera line

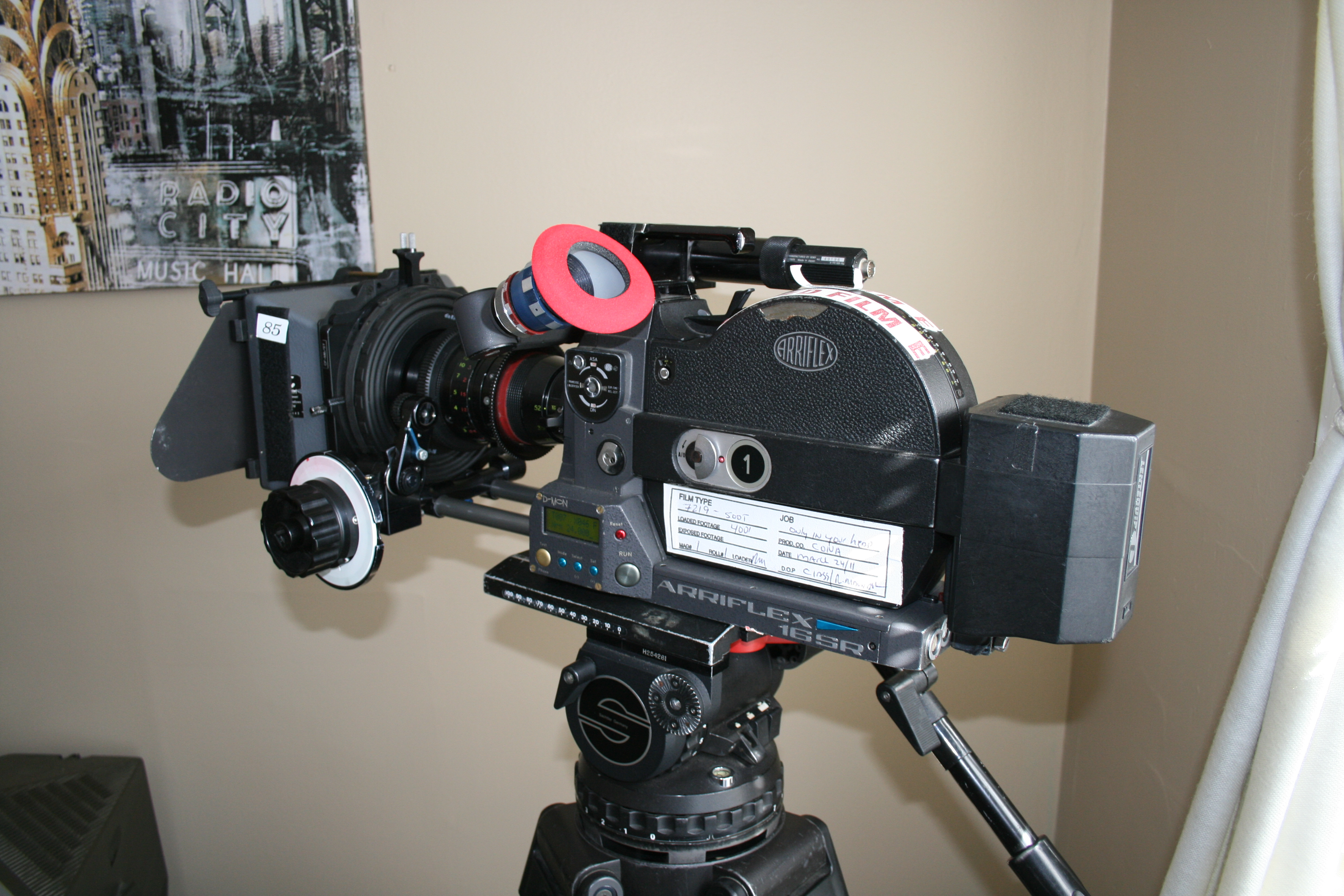
An Arriflex 16SR camera 16 mm camera.

The Arriflex 16SR is a motion picture camera product line created by Arri, introduced in 1975. This 16SR camera series is designed for 16 mm filmmaking in Standard 16 format. 'SR' Stands for Silent Reflex.

In 1982, Arri released the 16SR2, for improved function over the previous version, e.g. lower operational noise level.

In 1992, Arri released the 16SR3, the latest and the only series that can support the Super 16 format in the 16SR series without modification to the Super 16 format. It appeared in two versions: "Advanced" & "HS" (High Speed), for high speed filming.

The 16 SR series of cameras are distinguished by their small portable profile, their multidirectional viewfinder having a correctly upright picture in all positions, to the right and to the left of the camera, a crystal controlled motor and a quick-change 400 ft coaxial magazine. A 200 ft coaxial magazine was originally featured in the photo of the 16 SR in an Arri collective brochure in 1975, but this was only a prototype and was never marketed. The small 180 degree single-blade "half moon" mirror shutter always stops in the closed position (other Arri 16mm cameras, the 16 BL, 16M and 16 ST have twin-blade mirror shutters which stop randomly and have to be inched). Early 16 SR cameras were not exceptionally quiet, about 30 dB(A) one meter from the lens, but improvements rendered later cameras very quiet. The Arri 16 SR line was superseded by the Arriflex 416 line in 2006.

It is also the same type of camera used for Nirvana (band)'s halloween Live at the Paramount.

- Introduced in 1975.
- Arri bayonet lens mount.

== Arriflex 16SR2 ==
- Introduced in 1982.
- Arri bayonet lens mount in early models.
- PL lens mount in later models.
- Arri Precision Exposure Control (APEC) was added, which detects camera speed automatically.

=== Arriflex 16SR2-E ===
In 1982 Arri introduced the 16SR2-E (Economic), as a cheaper alternative to the SR2. For comparison, at its release the SR2 cost approximately $24K, while the 16SR-E cost $21K.

== Arriflex 16SR3 ==
- Introduced in 1992.
- Adding support of Super 16 format.
- PL lens mount.

=== Advanced ===
- Running speed: 5 to 75 frame/s

=== HS (High Speed) ===
- Running Speed: 5 to 150 frame/s

== Motion pictures ==
She's Gotta Have It (1986) – A film by Spike Lee

"Live at the Paramount" (1991) – a concert video for Nirvana

Clerks (1994) – A film by Kevin Smith

Closer to Home (1995) – A film by Joseph Nobile

The Castle (1997) – A film by Rob Sitch

Japón (2002) - A film by Carlos Reygadas

The Squid and the Whale (2005) – A film by Noah Baumbach

Loren Cass (2006) – A film by Chris Fuller

Uncle Boonmee Who Can Recall His Past Lives (2010) – A film by Apichatpong Weerasethakul

Black Swan (2010) – A film by Darren Aronofsky

Red Rocket (2021) – A film by Sean Baker

== Television ==
Lizzie McGuire (2001-2004) – A Disney series created by Terri Minsky

The O.C. (2003-2007) – A Warner Bros. series created by Josh Schwartz

== See also ==
- Arriflex 416, Arri's next generation's 16 mm camera system series.
