= Panavision cameras =

Movie cameras

Panavision has been a manufacturer of cameras for the motion picture industry since the 1950s, beginning with anamorphic widescreen lenses. The lightweight Panaflex is credited with revolutionizing filmmaking. Other influential cameras include the Millennium XL and the digital video Genesis.

== Panavision Silent Reflex ==
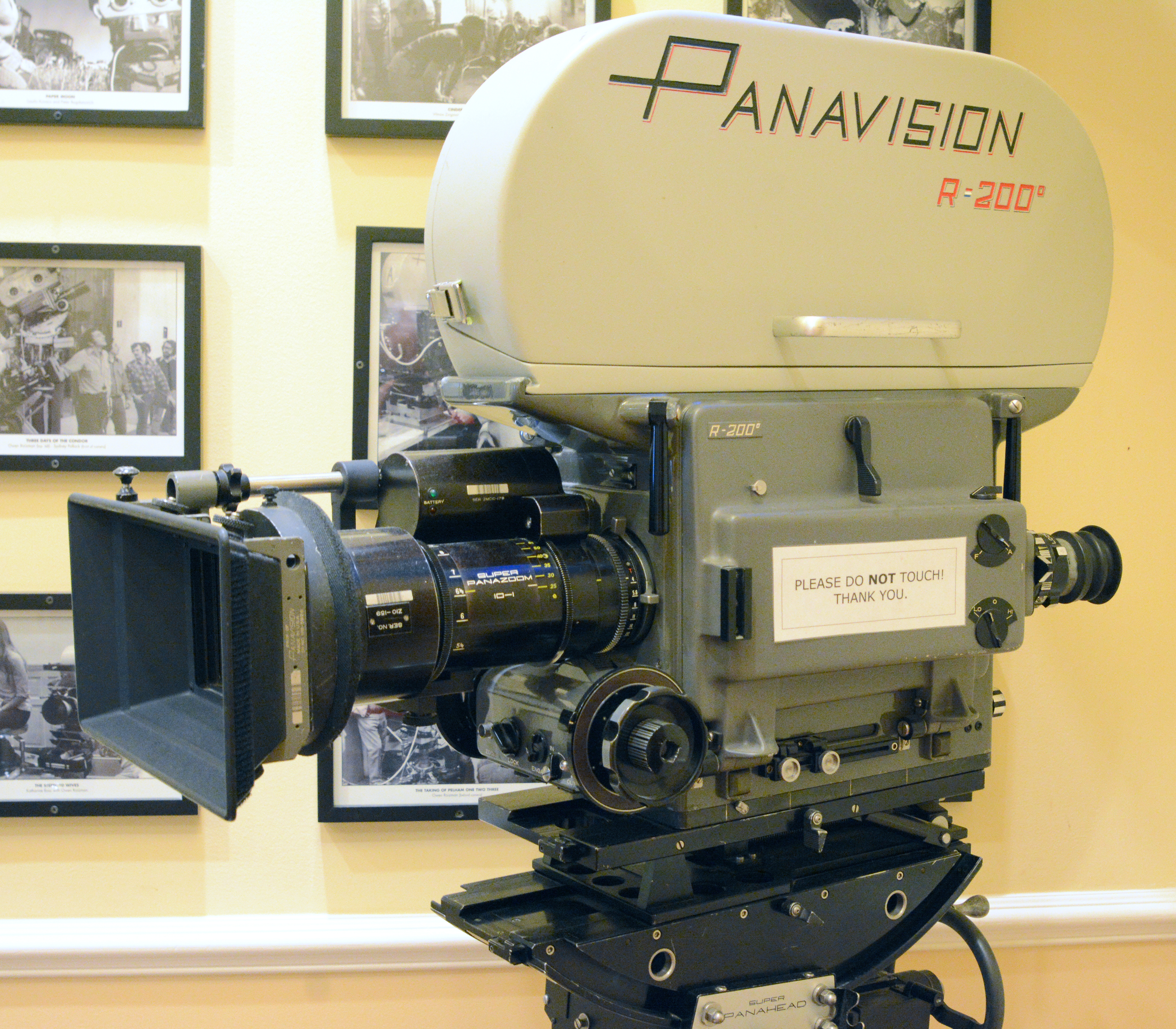
Panavision movie camera R-200°

- Panavision Silent Reflex (1967)
- Panavision Super PSR (R-200 or Super R-200)

== Panaflex ==
Panaflex (1972)

Panaflex-X (1974)

Panaflex Lightweight (1975)
The Panaflex Lightweight is a sync-sound 35 mm motion picture camera, stripped of all components not essential for work with "floating camera" systems such as the Steadicam. Contemporary cameras such as the Panavision Gold II can weigh as much as 60 lb (27 kg) depending on configuration. The Panaflex Lightweight II (1993) is crystal-controlled in one-frame increments between four and 36 frames per second, and has a fixed focal-plane shutter. 200°, 180°, 172.8° or 144° shutters can be installed by Panavision prior to rental per the customer's order. This camera is still available through Panavision.

Panaflex Gold (1976)

Panaflex Gold II (1987)

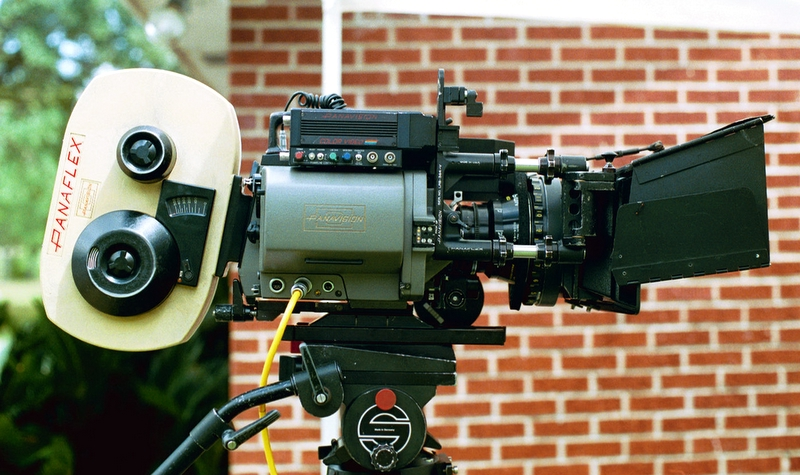
PFX-GII Golden Panaflex GII

The Panaflex Gold II is a sync-sound 35 mm motion picture camera. It is capable of crystal sync at 24 and 25 or 29.97 frame/s, and the non-sync speed is variable from 4–34 fps (frames per second) according to Panavision; the Gold II can safely run up to 40 fps, crystal controlled with a special board which can be fitted on request. It has a focal-plane shutter which can be adjusted from 50 to 200° while the camera is running, either by an external control unit or by manually turning a knob. Improvements over the Panavision Gold include a brighter viewfinder. While the movement remains essentially the same as the original Panaflex movement introduced in 1972, the Gold II's dual registration pins are "full-fitting" according to Panavision, implying a more precise grip on the film during exposure and thus greater sharpness. This camera is still available through Panavision.

== Panastar ==
Panastar (1977)

Panastar II (1987)
The Panastar II is an MOS 35 mm motion picture camera. It is capable of 4–120 fps both forward and reverse, though reverse running requires a reversing magazine, with camera timing crystal-controlled at one-frame increments. It has a focal-plane shutter which can be adjusted between 45° and 180° while the camera is running, either by using an external remote control or manually turning a knob. Improvements over the original Panastar include a weight reduction of 5 lb (2.3 kg), a more accurate digital shutter angle readout, the inclusion of the Panaglow ground glass illuminator, and the ability to adjust the speed of the camera in single-frame increments without need for an external speed control, rather that being tied to the preset running speeds of the first Panastar. At high speeds, the Panastar II is incredibly loud, often leading those unfamiliar with its operation to question whether it is functioning properly.

== Panaflex Platinum ==
- Platinum (1986): The Panaflex Platinum is a sync-sound 35 mm motion picture camera, intended as the replacement for the Gold and Gold II series of cameras. It is capable of 4–36 fps forward and reverse in 1/10 frame increments, and is crystal-controlled at all speeds. It has a focal-plane shutter which can be adjusted from 50 to 200° while the camera is running, either by an external control unit or by manually turning a knob. While the movement remains essentially the same as the original Panaflex movement introduced in 1972, the Platinum's dual registration pins are "full-fitting" according to Panavision, implying a more precise grip on the film during exposure and thus greater sharpness.

== Panaflex Millennium ==
Millennium (1997)
The Panaflex Millennium is a sync-sound 35 mm motion picture camera. Where the Panavision Platinum was mostly an evolution and refinement of the original 1972 Panaflex, the Millennium is a totally new design, having a new twin-sprocket drum incorporated with the movement, major electronics revisions, and a general weight reduction from 24 to 17 lb (7.7 kg). The Millennium is capable of 3–50 fps forward and reverse, though reverse running requires a reversing magazine, and it has a focal-plane shutter, the aperture angle of which can be adjusted electronically while the camera is running, between 11.2° and 180°, allowing for four stops of exposure ramping within a shot with no iris adjustment. All of the focus, iris, and zoom motor controls have been moved to the camera's internal circuitry, removing the need for cumbersome external circuit boxes, and it has an integrated camera built into the lens light, allowing the first assistant camera to see witness marks without having to physically look at the lens. It also has a brighter viewfinder than the Platinum, multiple run switches, and footage counters on either side of the camera for easier readings.

Millennium XL (1999)
Millennium XL2 (2004)

== Digital video ==
- Sony HDW-900 CineAlta (2002)
- Panavision Genesis (2005)
- Millennium Digital XL (2016): The Millennium DXL is an 8k Digital Cinema camera based on the Red Digital Cinema Weapon platform. It marks the first digital camera in Panavision's portfolio to carry the Millennium name. The Red designed and produced 8k sensor is a 40.96mm wide sensor putting it about halfway between super35 (24.92mm) and 65mm (48.59mm) in size.

Weighing in at 10 lbs, this 16-bit, 35.5 Megapixel CMOS sensor camera system operates at a maximum frame rate of 60 fps at 8K Full Frame (8192 x 4320) resolution, and 75 fps at 8K 2.4:1 (8192 x 3456). Along with its ability to capture up to 15 stops of dynamic range, the DXL can record 8K RAW, .r3d (supported in RED SDK) with simultaneous 4K proxy (ProRes or DNx), for up to 1 hour on a single magazine.
It is capable of proprietary image mapping process Light Iron Color profile, which is compatible with all currently popular gamuts and transfer curves.
The Millennium DXL is the first camera to capture 4K anamorphic at 21 megapixels. With the 8K HDR sensor, this camera is optimized for Panavision large format lenses, including the Sphero 65, System 65, Super Panavision 70, Ultra Panavision 70, and the new Primo 70 and Primo Artiste (2017) wirelessly motorized lenses.
- Millennium Digital XL2 (2018)

== 65 mm ==
- Super Panavision 70 (1965)
- Panavision Super 70
- Panavision System 65 (1991)

System 65 is Panavision's most modern range of cameras for the 5/65 format. It comprises two separate camera offerings:

- Panaflex 65SPFX (intended for studio use)
- Panaflex 65HSSM (suitable for location use but limited to MOS only).

== Lens mount ==
Panavision produced a proprietary standard lens mount, the "PV mount" for "Panavision mount", which according to social media was only suitable for use with Panavision lens. As of 2012, the PV mount was the second most prevalent mount after the differently sized PL mount among professional cinematographers. The PV mount imposes the longest flange focal length among common commercial mounts, as of 2012, at 57.15 mm.

== See also ==
- Super Panavision 70
- Ultra Panavision 70
