= Arricam =

35 mm movie camera line

- Variant models: Studio (ST), Lite (LT)
- Manufacturer: Arri
- Introduced: 2000 (ST and LT)
- Gauge: 35 mm
- Weight: ST 8.15 kg/17.95 lbs (body with finder); LT 4 kg/8.8 lbs (body), 5.25 kg/11.56 (body with finder)
- Movement: Five link with dual registration pins and pulldown claws, 3 or 4-perf pulldown, pitch adjustment
- Speed: ST 1–60 frames per second (forward) and 1–32 frames per second (reverse) LT 1–40 frames per second (forward) and 1–32 frames per second (reverse – ST mags needed). Both models crystal accurate to 0.001 frame/s.
- Aperture size: .980" x .735"
- Aperture plate: removable, includes gel holder
- Motor: DC with quartz crystal control, separate electronically linked motors for shutter and movement
- Operating noise level: ST <20 dB LT <24 dB at 4-perf.
- Indicators: speed, run, counter (ft or m), shutter angle, time code (user bit and sensitivity level), voltage, incorrect movement, asynchronous speed, low battery, film end, heater, film jam, loose magazine
- Lens mount: Arri PL (Super 35 compatible)
- Lens control: Arri-style follow focus. Integrated Lens Data System (LDS) and Lens Control System (LCS).
- Shutter: electronic reflex mirror; Can adjusted between 0° and 180° while in standby; rampable between 11.2° and 180° while running. Fully adjustable within 0.1° increments.
- Viewfinder: Studio, Lite, Studio Universal, and Lite Universal. All cover Super 35, rotates 360° and to left or right of camera with manual adjustment for maintaining upright image continuously. Can be used with either eye. Manual image adjustment standard on all. Studio Universal and Lite Universal have anamorphic switch available. Standard 80/20 beamsplitter, but entire viewfinder and beamsplitter can be replaced with 100% video tap for Steadicam or remote rigging. Heated eyepiece and eyepiece extenders also available.
- Video assist: Arricam Integrated Video System (IVS) standard; colour, flicker-free, video iris, gain, frame lines, lens data (with LDS system), color temperature, freeze and compare
- Ground glass: Interchangeable. Arriglow module available.
- Magazines: Lite only rear-mounted, available in 400 ft (122 m) shoulder and 400 ft (120 m) Steadicam versions. 400 ft (120 m) and 1000 ft (300 m) Studio mags can be used with an adapter. All have torque motors and include LCD footage counters. Studio magazines have manual footage counters and take-up.
- Magazine loading: active displacement mags; takes up emulsion in (9P design).
- Film cores: standard cores
- Matte boxes: Arriflex MB or LMB models, 15 or 19 mm rods
- Electronic accessories: 24 V and 12 V ports, with combined 7 A maximum load; shutter timing shift box (TSB), zoom control (ZMU), wireless remote system (WRS), wireless remote control (WRC), remote control unit (RCU), universal motor controller (UMC), lens data archive (LDA), heated eyepiece (HE), lens data mount (LDM), integrated video system (IVS), Varicon flashing unit, external sync unit (ESU), cine tape measure, accessory power box (APB), remote switch (RS), onboard video monitor, lens data display (LDD), work light
- Optical accessories: shift and tilt lens system, eyepiece leveller, pentafinder, wide angle eyepiece
- Other accessories: lightweight follow focus (LFF), lightweight support rods, third party accessories
- Batteries: 24V
- Environment protection: third party covers and housings, rain deflector
- Camera support: Arrihead, bridge plate, handgrip, shoulder set, shoulder cushion, underslung bracket for Steadicam

Arricam is a 35 mm movie camera line manufactured by Arri.

== Description ==
It is Arri's flagship sync-sound camera line, replacing the Arriflex 535 line. The design was developed by Fritz Gabriel Bauer and Walter Trauninger, and is heavily derivative of the cameras Bauer created for his Moviecam company, which was bought out by Arri in the mid-1990s. As such, the Arricam is a fusion of the mechanical and intuitive design innovations of the Moviecam and the interchangeable accessories and complex electronic integration of the Arriflex. As of 2006, the Arricam is considered, along with the Panaflex Millennium line, the top sync-sound camera system currently in usage, and is extremely popular amongst bigger budget feature films. The line comprises two camera body models, the ST (Studio) and LT (Lite). The Arricam ST is intended as a full-capability camera, including two camera magazine mounting configurations, whereas the Arricam LT is optimized for smaller, lightweight usage in handheld and Steadicam application, with only the option to mount the magazine in the rear position. Both cameras use motorized displacement magazines, have electronic rotating mirror shutters mounted beneath the film gate (as opposed to beside it, as in Panavision cameras), and contain independently adjustable sprocket pulleys within the camera body.
