= Rotary disc shutter =

Semicircular disc shutter in a motion picture camera

When the shutter is open, the film is exposed. When it closes, the next frame of film is brought into position by the claw.

Adjusting the shutter angle affects the amount of time that film is exposed to light.

A rotary disc shutter is a type of shutter. It is notably used in motion picture cameras. Rotary shutters are semicircular discs that spin in front of the film gate, alternately allowing light from the lens to strike the film, or blocking it.

== Details ==
Rotary shutters are semicircular discs that spin in front of the film gate, alternately allowing light from the lens to strike the film, or blocking it. When blocking the light, the exposed portion of the film is advanced, and another, pristine frame is moved into position. The spinning disc then exposes the new frame of film. The nature of light-sensitive film requires a shutter to block the light and prevent smearing of the image as the film is advanced through the camera. Digital sensors do not require a rotary shutter, although some high-end digital cinema cameras do have them. Some rotary shutters utilize mirrors (or mirrored surfaces) so that when the shutter is in its closed position, light from the lens is redirected to a viewing system, allowing the camera operator to view, frame, and focus the image, exactly as the film sees it.

=== Shutter Angle ===
On more advanced cameras, the open portion of the shutter can be adjusted. This shutter setting is referred to as the shutter angle. Adjusting the shutter angle controls the proportion of time that the film is exposed to light during each frame interval. The angle of the shutter forms a proportion to the time that each frame of film is exposed:

$$\frac{\text{shutter angle}}{360^\circ} = \frac{\text{exposure time}}{\text{frame interval}}$$.

The primary reason that cinematographers adjust the shutter angle is to control the amount of motion blur that is recorded on each successive frame of film. A tight shutter angle will constrict motion blur. A wide shutter angle will allow it. A 180° shutter angle is considered normal.

So for instance, at 24 fps the frame interval value is 0.04167 second ( = 1/24 ). Using an exposure time of 1/50 second gives a shutter angle value of 173°, very close to 180° (normal motion blur effect).

Tight shutters create a stuttering stop-motion animation look that has become popular in action and war films. In particular, tight shutters are used to capture particles flying through the air, such as dirt from an exploding mortar.

On most film cameras the shutter angle is changed by removing the lens and adjusting the shutter with a special tool. This cannot be done while the camera is operating. Some cameras such as the Arriflex 435ES can modify their shutter angle during the shot. This is sometimes referred to as an electronic shutter. An electronic shutter can compensate for the exposure change caused by a speed ramp without changing the aperture and affecting depth of field.

Other types of shutter adjustments, such as an out-of-phase shutter and a fluttering shutter, are also possible. Normally the film is held steady in the gate whenever it is exposed to light. Special shutter adjustments allow the film to be exposed while the camera mechanism is actually moving the film to the next frame. In the film Saving Private Ryan, cinematographer Janusz Kamiński used such a shutter adjustment to give his film the look of World War II newsreel photography. Previously, this effect could only be achieved by purposefully mis-adjusting the timing belt of the film advance mechanism in the camera. However, several manufacturers now provide accessories to electronically control the phase relationship of the shutter and film advance mechanisms. One such device is the Timing Shift Box available for the above mentioned ARRI 435 series.

== Electronic equivalent ==
Many video cameras also provide the ability to adjust their shutter. In most cases the camera does not have an actual mechanical shutter. Instead, this adjustment controls the amount of time that the electronic sensor collects light in order to create each successive image. Because electronic cameras do not need to mechanically advance film, it is possible for the shutter to be open for nearly the entire period of each successive frame. At 24 frames per second, it is possible to expose a frame for nearly 1/24 second, achieving longer motion blur otherwise impossible to achieve on film at sync sound speeds.

It is even possible for the shutter to be open for multiple frames, far beyond that possible with a 360° shutter angle. One example is the Sony PD170 where the shutter can be set as low as 1/3 second; accumulating light across 10 frames (at a frame rate of approximately 30 frames of 60 interlaced fields per second for the NTSC version of the camera and 25 of 50 for the PAL version)

The term electronic shutter is often used to describe the electronic process of controlling exposure time on a light sensor. The same term is also used in film cameras to refer to a mechanical rotary shutter which can adjust its shutter angle electronically while shooting.

== Rotary shutters on still cameras ==
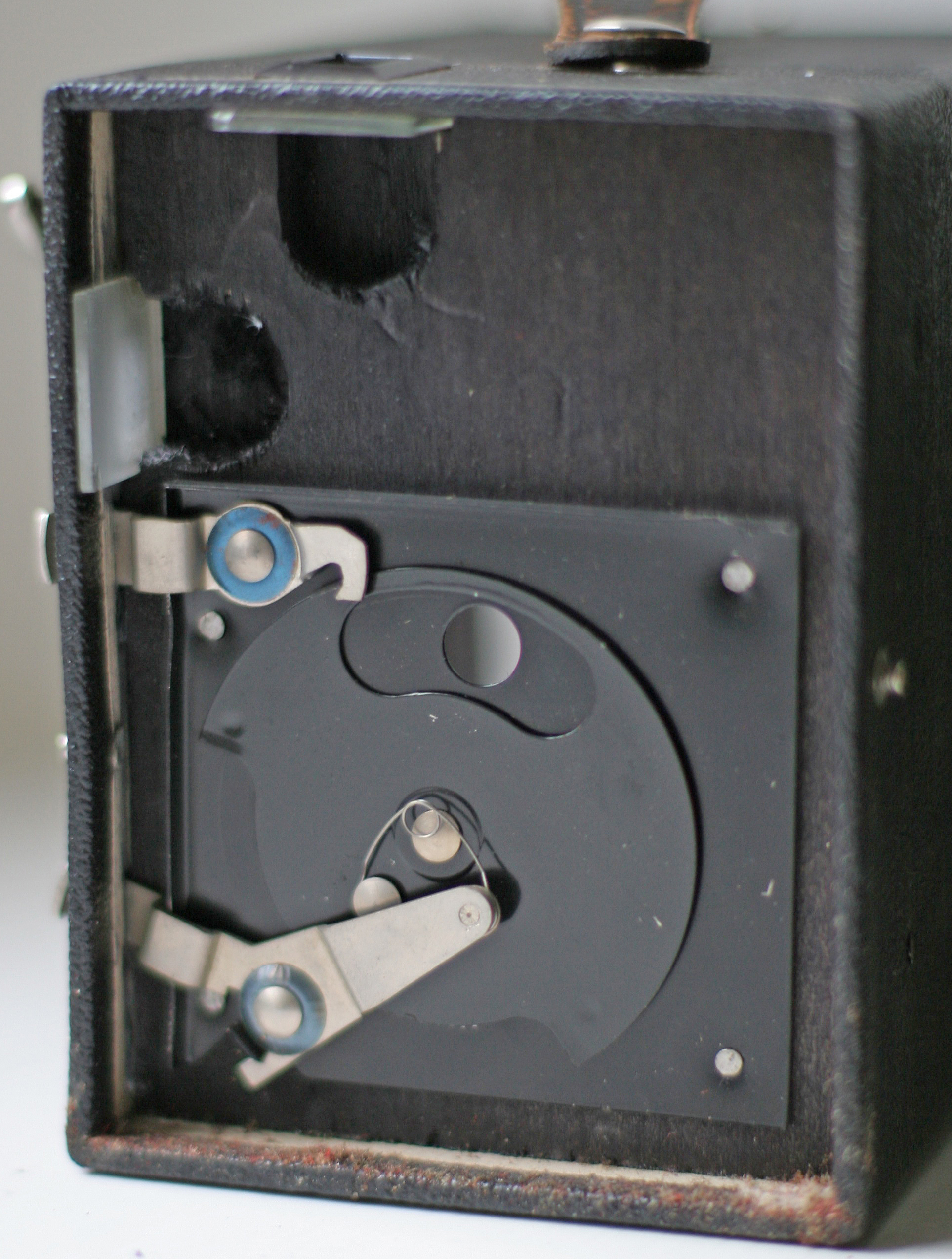
Rotary shutter in an Agfa Caja 44

While the vast majority of rotary shutters are naturally used on motion-picture cameras (as well as projectors), there were some still cameras that employed this type of shutter, notably the Univex Mercury rangefinder and the Olympus Pen F SLR. Both of these cameras were half-frame 35mm cameras (frame size 18 mm × 24 mm). The rotary shutter proved to be very simple to construct, accurate and reliable in these cameras. Though, in the case of the Univex, it resulted in an apparent hump on top of the camera to cover the shutter disc.

== See also ==
- Shutter speed
- Time-lapse – technique with issues similar to those of shutter angle
