= MOS (filmmaking) =

Acronym meaning no synchronous audio track

MOS is a standard filmmaking jargon acronym used in production reports to indicate an associated film segment has no synchronous audio track.

Omitting sound recording from a particular shot can save time and relieve the film crew of certain requirements, such as remaining silent during a take, and thus MOS takes are common on contemporary film shoots, mostly when the subjects of the take are not speaking or otherwise generating useful sound.

In post-production, a MOS take may be combined with miscellaneous sounds recorded on location, the musical soundtrack, voice-overs, or sound effects created by a Foley artist.

== Origin of the term ==
There are many theories regarding the source of the abbreviation "MOS".

When sound recording reached the point where the sound was recorded on a synchronized but separate piece of media (such as 35mm film, audio tape, or other media), a method of keeping the recording media and camera film "in sync" was needed. The solution was to use a special form of motor which has multiple "windings" in it, and which can be connected to another identical motor in such a way that turning one motor a certain distance will turn the other motor exactly the same distance. The motors did not have to be close together, and, with appropriate circuitry, did not have to be of the same size or power. These motors were called selsyn (self synchronous) motors. A system was created by which a single sound recording room could be connected to any of the stages on a studio lot (such connection points are still visible on some of the oldest stages). The production sound mixer on stage connected the control panel to the recording room and the camera. There was a selsyn motor on the camera and it was linked to a matching selsyn motor on the sound recording equipment at another point on the studio lot.

In order to use this system, the sound mixer used an intercom to the sound recordist to tell him to "roll", or start the system. Since this was a mechanical system, it took some time to start the motors and get them up to proper speed. When proper speed and synchronization was reached, the recordist would use the intercom to announce, "Speed" and the sound mixer would relay that to the director and crew on the stage. The expression is still used, but now simply means, "Sound is recording".

It was the recordist who started and stopped the camera motor. The camera operator had a switch to ensure that the camera did not roll at an inopportune time such as loading, replacing lenses, etc. It was also the recordist's duty to stop the motor if something went amiss. The actual power source for the camera motor was in the sound booth.

When a shot was planned that did not require sound, the sound mixer would ask the recordist to "roll the motor only". The recordist would start the camera motor without starting the matching "sound" motor and electronics. The procedure, allegedly, acquired the name "motor only shot", which became the basis of the acronym MOS.

=== Alternative origin ===
An origin theory is that MOS stands for broken English "mit ohne sound", that is, "without sound" as an unnamed 1920s German-émigré director might have said it.

According to this theory, a German director, recently transplanted to Hollywood (probably Ernst Lubitsch, but possibly Fritz Lang), was asked by a script supervisor how he would like to shoot the next scene of the day. The director apparently responded "mit ohne sprechen!" which translates to "with without speaking", and so this was noted as a joke on the production reports and the camera slates for the shot. However, the apparently nonsensical phrase "mit ohne" is used commonly in spoken German albeit jokingly looked down upon.

In The Screenwriter's Bible, author David Trottier credits the term to Austrian director Erich von Stroheim, who allegedly would tell his crew "Ve'll shoot dis mid out sound."

=== Unsubstantiated meanings ===
Other explanations for the meaning of the initials have appeared over the years in books, articles, publications, journals, and web pages:

- mic off stage
- minus optical signal
- minus optical stripe
- minus optical sound
- motor only sync
- music on side
- muted on screen
- mute on sound

== Published definitions ==
=== Occurrences ===
- MOS Scene shot silent, i.e., without sound rolling. Derives from "mit out sound" as in "ve vill shoot it mit out sound," allegedly spoken by a director of Germanic descent to his Hollywood crew. Pronounced "m-o-s".
- MOS stands for "mit-out sound" and is a continuing industry joke on the German directors who came to Hollywood in the late 1920s and early 1930s and preferred to add sound to their shots in post-production.
- MOS Literally "mit-out sound". Used to denote a picture take for which no sound was shot.
- M.O.S. Script abbreviation calling for a silent shot or scene accompanied by neither dialogue nor sound effects. It is said to have originated with a German-speaking Hollywood director who habitually referred to such shot as "mit out sound". At first used jokingly by cinema crews, the abbreviation stuck in film terminology. A shot of a scene without sound is sometimes also called a "wild picture," a term borrowed from its counterpart, "wild sound," the recording of sound without an accompanying picture.
- It features MOS as well as studio self-blimped versions.... Used as a shorthand term for a motion picture camera that is not designed for synchronous (direct) sound photography.
- Shots without sound are labelled MOS on camera reports; MOS stands for "mit-out sound," naturally.
- When there is no sound on a take, the sound no. is erased (from the slate) and the letters MOS ("Mit Out Sound") substituted to indicate it is a silent take. Everyone in the industry is familiar with the story of the German-accented Director who called "without sound," and the phonetics-minded slateman who started a film industry tradition. Also see Figure 5-1 (Image of term as used on a camera report).
- MOS (mit-out-sound) An expression used instead of saying silent shot.
- M.O.S. - a silent shot (Mit out sound)

=== Absences ===
The terms "MOS," "motor only shot," "mit out sound," or any of their versions, do not occur in the following works:

- Academy of Motion Picture Arts and Sciences (1931). Cowan, Lester (ed.). Recording Sound for Motion Pictures. New York: McGraw-Hill Book Company.

A compilation of lectures on sound sponsored by the Academy of Motion Picture Arts and Sciences, held from September 17, 1929 through December 16, 1929.

- Academy of Motion Picture Arts and Sciences Research Council (1938). Motion Picture Sound Engineering. New York: D. Van Nostrand Company, Incorporated.

A Series of Lectures Presented to the Classes Enrolled in the Courses in Sound Engineering Given by the Research Council of the Academy of Motion Picture Arts and Sciences, Hollywood, California, in the fall of 1936 and spring of 1937.

- Cameron, James R. Cameron's Encyclopedia on Sound Motion Pictures, Cameron Publishing Company, Manhattan Beach, NY, 1930.
- Cameron, James R. and Joseph S. Cifre. Cameron's Encyclopedia: Sound Motion Pictures, Cameron Publishing Company, Coral Gables, Florida, Sixth edition, 1959.
- Cameron, James R. Sound Motion Pictures: Recording and Reproducing, Cameron Publishing Company, Coral Gables, Florida, Seventh edition, 1950.
- Rose, Jackson J. American Cinematographer Hand Book and Reference Guide, Ninth edition, 1956.
- Tremaine, Howard M. The Audio Cyclopedia, Howard W. Sams and Company (Bobbs-Merrill Company), Indianapolis and New York, First edition, April 1959.
- American Cinematographer Manual, first edition, 1960; second edition 1966; third edition 1969; and fourth edition 1973.
- Goldstein, Laurence and Jay Kaufman. Into Film, E.P. Dutton and Company, New York, First edition, 1976.

Additionally, the term(s) do not occur in any book published in the United Kingdom on motion picture production or post-production methods and procedures.

== See also ==
- Sound on tape
