= Bleach bypass =

Chemical effect

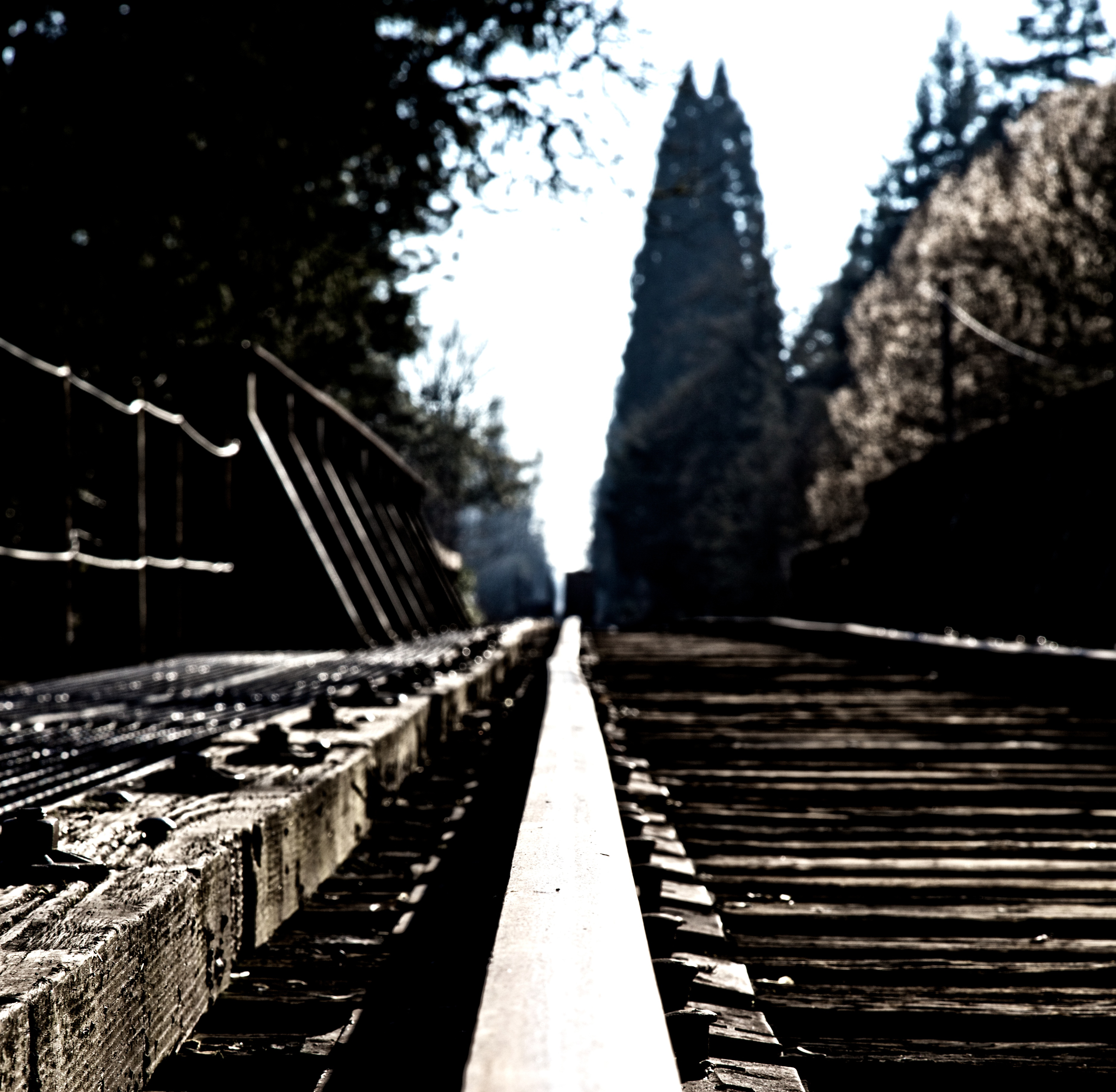
Example of a bleach bypass emulated photograph

Bleach bypass, also known as skip bleach or silver retention, is a modification of traditional film processing through black and white or orthocromatic overlay that is used to achieve muted colors but rich blacks.

It generally involves the weakened or partial omission of the bleaching function during the last stage of processing of color film. By doing this, the silver crystals that produce an image in photochemical film stocks are retained in the emulsion alongside the color dyes. This effectively results in a black-and-white image superimposed on the three color separations unified by the final print of color film stock. Film printed in this way usually have reduced saturation and exposure latitude, along with increased contrast and more prominent grain. It usually is used to maximum effect in conjunction with a one-stop underexposure.

== Technique ==
Bleach bypass can be done to any photochemical step in the process, be it original camera negative, interpositive, internegative or release print. For motion pictures, it is usually applied at the internegative stage, as insurance companies usually are reluctant to have the camera negative bleach bypassed, or the interpositive (a "protection"/"preservation" element), in the event that the look is agreed to be too extreme, and the cost of the process for each individual release print is most often cost-prohibitive. The effect, however, will render slightly differently at each stage, especially between the camera negative and interpositive stages.

Bleach bypass generally refers to a complete circumvention of the bleach stage of development, and is the most commonly offered service among laboratories. Technicolor's ENR and OZ and Deluxe Labs' ACE and CCE processes are proprietary variants which allow the film to be only partially bleached, giving the cinematographer a more finely tuned control over the effect rendered by the process.

The effect can be simulated with digital intermediate color grading.

== Use in film and television ==
"Bleach bypass", as used in this context, was first used in Kon Ichikawa's film Her Brother (1960). A former chemist, cinematographer Kazuo Miyagawa invented bleach bypass for Ichikawa's film. Miyagawa had been inspired by the color rendition created by Oswald Morris for John Huston's 1956 film of Moby-Dick using dye-transfer Technicolor, and was achieved through the use of an additional black-and-white overlay. Actually, this is a throw-back to pre-1944 Technicolor, which incorporated a silver-containing "blank receiver" with the silver image printed from the green separation negative, but at 50% density, upon which the color dyes were imprinted by utilizing "imbibition"; this concept may have been employed here, but at a different density.

The technique remained largely overlooked by Western cinematographers until its use by Roger Deakins in all release prints for the movie Nineteen Eighty-Four. At one point, Radford and the cinematographer Roger Deakins originally wanted to shoot the film in black and white, but the financial backers of the production, Virgin Films, opposed this idea. Instead, Deakins used bleach bypass to give a distinctive washed-out look to the film's color values as this was recreated for this production by Key.

The effect subsequently became a standard option in film labs around the world and saw widespread use before the near-universal adoption of digital cinema in the 2020s. Practitioners include cinematographers Ericson Core, Rodrigo Prieto, Remi Adefarasin, Darius Khondji, Dariusz Wolski, Walter Carvalho, Oliver Stapleton, Newton Thomas Sigel, Park Gok-ji, Shane Hurlbut, Steven Soderbergh (as "Peter Andrews"), Tom Stern, Vittorio Storaro, and Janusz Kamiński (notably on Steven Spielberg's Saving Private Ryan and Minority Report).
