= Original camera negative =

Film capturing the original movie image

The original camera negative (OCN) is the film in a traditional film-based movie camera which captures the original image. This is the film from which all other copies will be made. It is known as raw stock prior to exposure.

The size of a roll varies depending on the film gauge and whether or not a new roll, re-can, or short end was used. One hundred or 400 foot rolls are common in 16mm, while 400 or 1,000 foot (ft) rolls are used in 35mm work. While these are the most common sizes, other lengths such as 200, 800, or 1,200 ft may be commercially available from film stock manufacturers, usually by special order. Rolls of 100 and 200 ft are generally wound on spools for daylight-loading, while longer lengths are only wound around a plastic core. Core-wound stock has no exposure protection outside its packaging, and therefore must be loaded into a camera magazine within a darkroom or changing bag/tent in order to prevent the film being fogged.

== Value ==
Original camera negative is of great value, as if lost or damaged it cannot be re-created without re-shooting the scene, something which is often impossible. It also contains the highest-quality version of the original image available, before any analog resolution and dynamic range loss from copying. For these reasons, original camera negative is handled with great care, and only by specialized trained people in dedicated film laboratories.

== Procedures in the laboratory ==
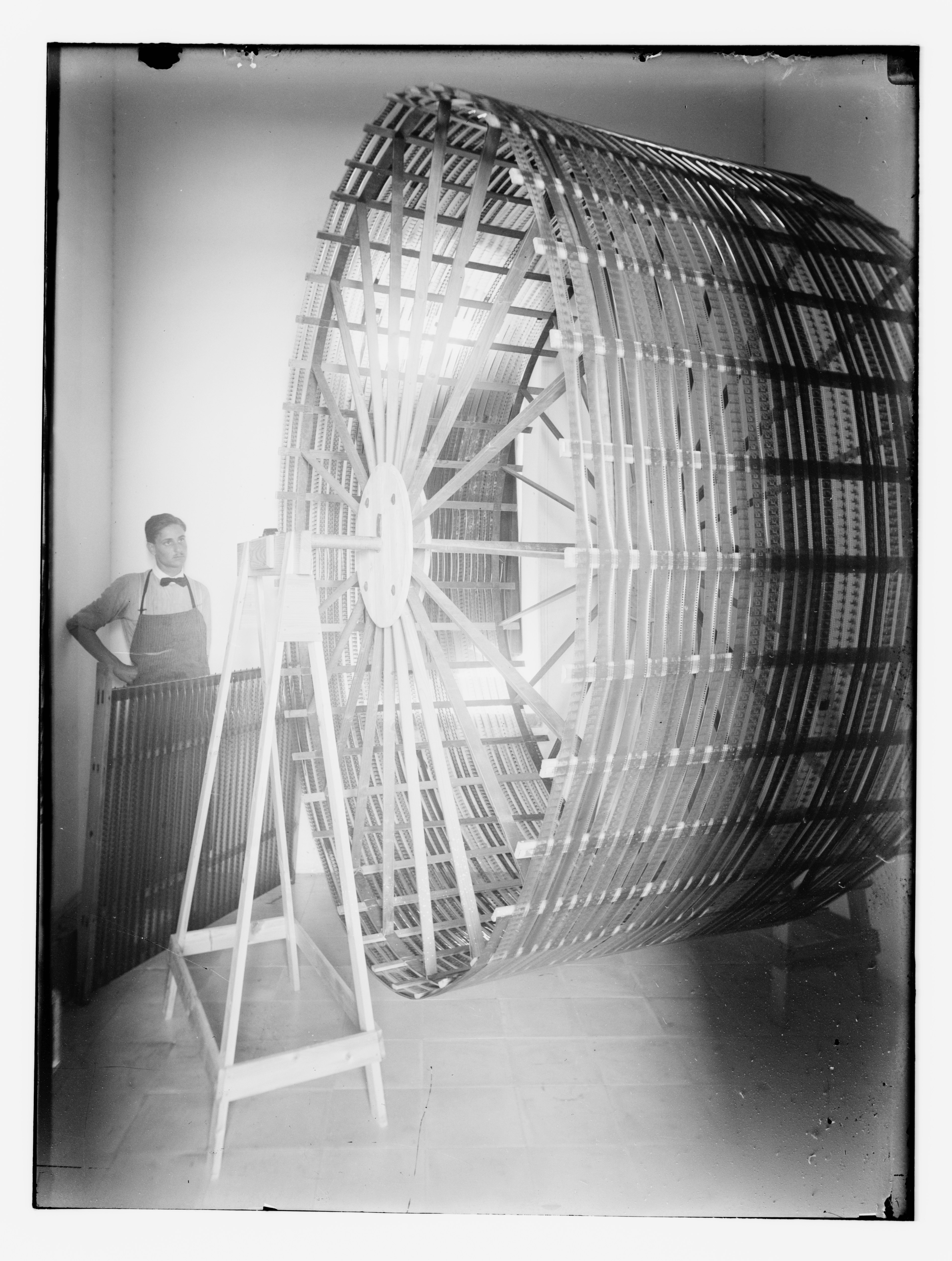
Jamil Albina with a film dryer drying original camera negatives at the American Colony in Jerusalem, 1930s.

After the film is processed by the film lab, camera rolls are assembled into lab rolls of 1,200 to 1,500 ft. Work prints may be made for viewing dailies or editing the picture on film.

Once film editing is finalized, a negative cutter will conform the negative using the Keykode on the edge of the film as a reference, cutting the original camera negative and incorporating any opticals (titles, dissolves, fades, and special effects), and cementing it together into several rolls.

The edited original negative is then copied to create a safety positive which can be used as a backup to create a usable negative. At this point, an answer print will be created from the original camera negative, and upon its approval, interpositives (IPs) and internegatives (INs) are created, from which the release prints are made. Generally speaking, the original camera negative is considered too important and delicate to be used for any processes more than necessary, as each pass through a lab process carries the risk of further degrading the quality of the negative by scratching the emulsion. Once an answer print is approved, the interpositives and internegatives are regarded as the earliest generation of the finished and graded film, and are almost always used for transfers to video or new film restorations. The original camera negatives is usually regarded as a last resort in the event that all of the intermediate elements have been compromised or lost.

The more popular a film is, the higher the likelihood that the original negative is in a worse condition, due to the need to return to the original camera negative to strike new interpositives to replace the exhausted ones, and thus create more internegatives and release prints. Before 1969, 35mm prints were struck directly from the original negative, often running into hundreds of copies, and causing further wear on the original.

== Digital cameras ==
Physical film stock is still occasionally used in film-making, particularly in prestige productions where the director and cinematographer have the power to require the extra cost, but as of 2016, it is becoming increasingly rare.

In modern cinematography, the camera is usually a digital camera, and no physical negative exists. However, the concept of "camera original material" is still used to describe camera image data. Camera original material that has not yet been ingested, duplicated, and archived is in a similar precarious state to original camera negative in a film process. One of the jobs of the digital imaging technician is to ensure that digital camera original material is backed up as soon as possible.
