= Changing bag =

Photographic bag designed to be light-proof

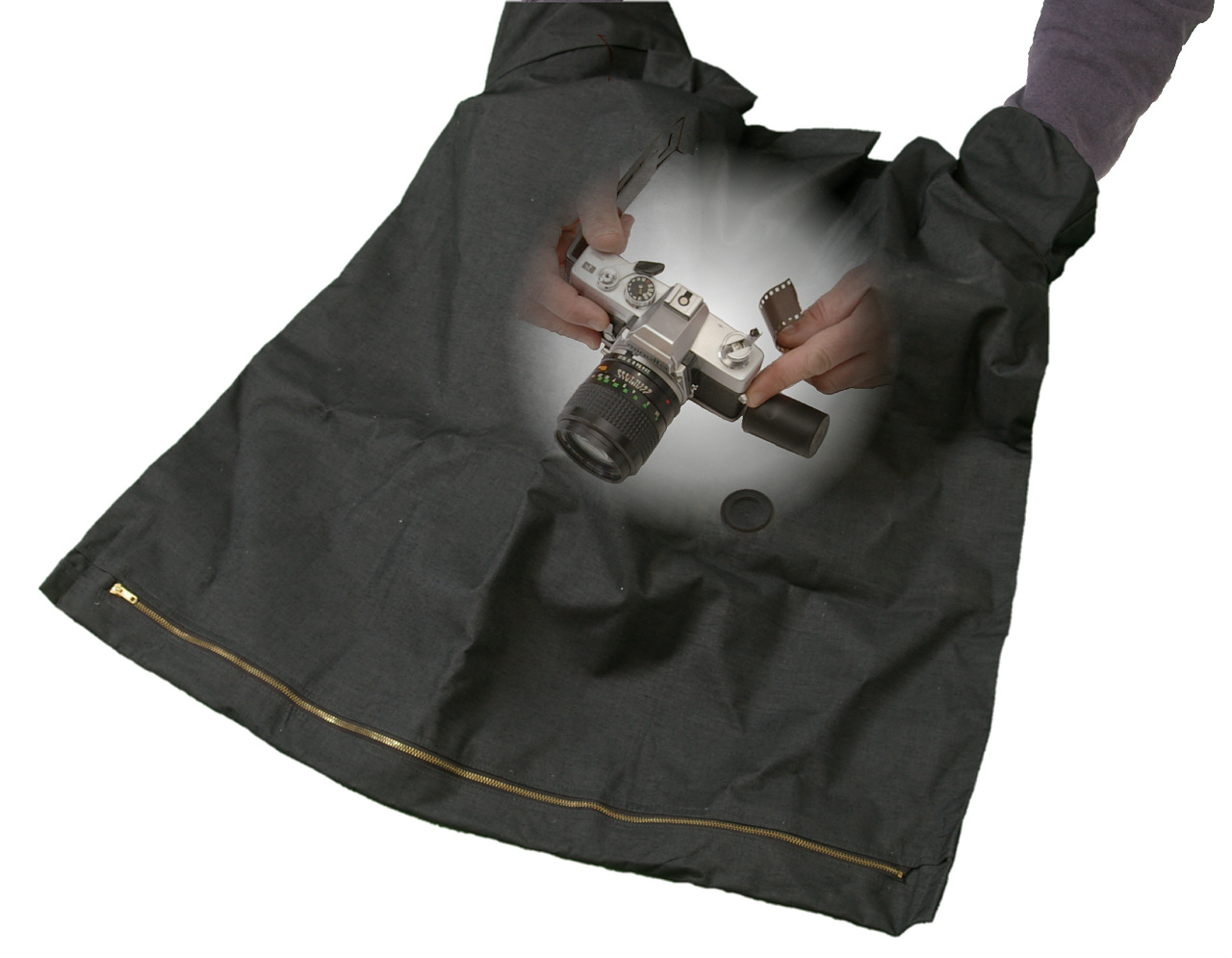
Changing bag for small format.(perspective image)

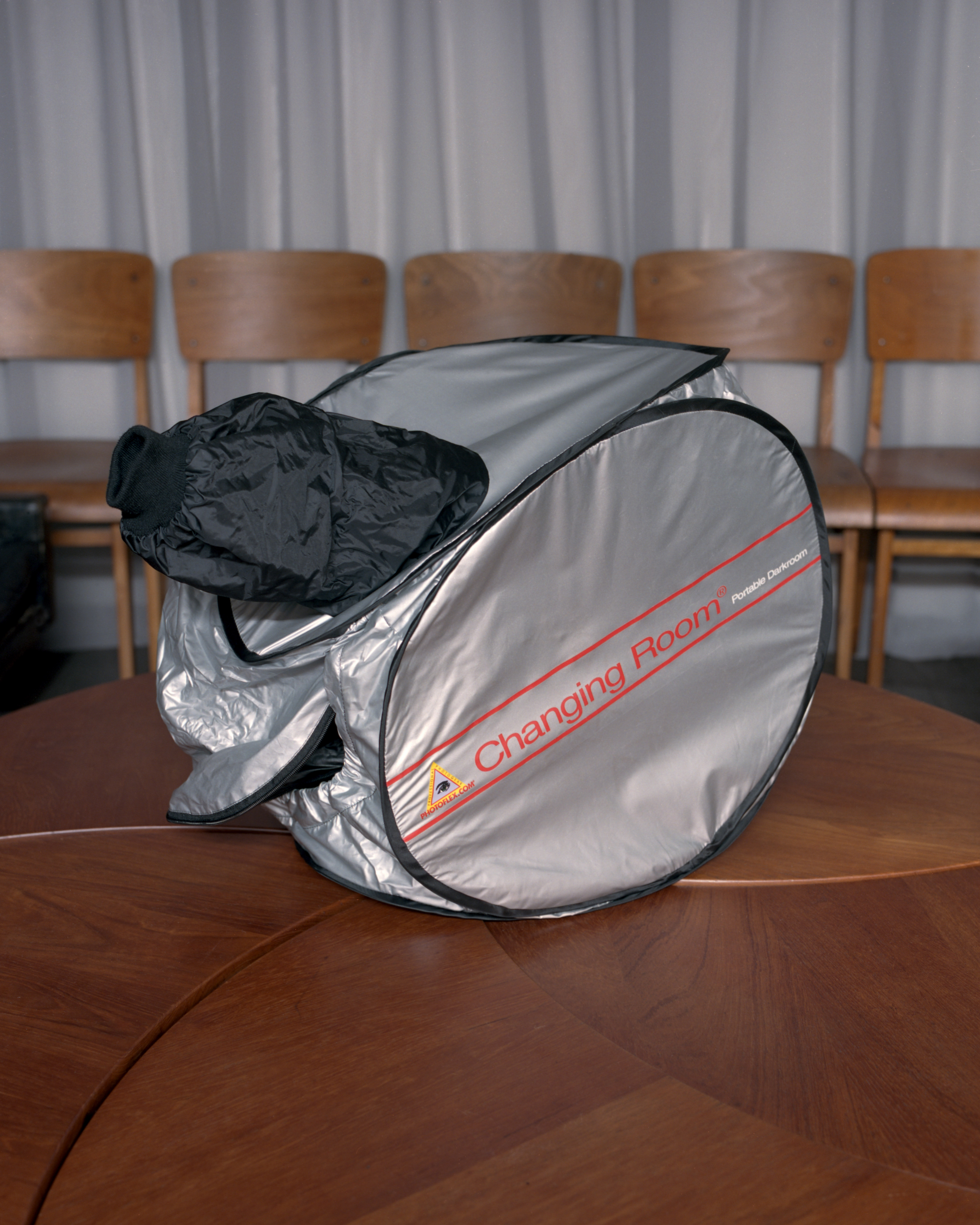
Changing bag for large format.

A changing bag is a photographic bag specifically designed to be light-proof and therefore to protect the light sensitive (unexposed) film before intended use. A changing bag is made of light proof material, and usually is composed of synthetic fibre. They are convenient to use when a darkroom is not available, as when in the field. Many photographers do not own or have access to a darkroom, yet still need to being able to protect film from light, as when removing film from its canister to put it into a developing tank, or loading and unloading sheet film holders. They are also commonly found on the set of a film, where the clapper loader may need one if shooting on location or far away from a darkroom.

== Usage ==
A changing bag is routinely used by amateur photographers and others when a darkroom is not available as is often the case in field shooting. It is also used in commercial photo processing labs, often to change paper.

== Description ==
A changing bag has two sleeves at one end for both the user's arms, and a zipper (often more than one, for double layered changing bags) to insert the tools and film needed. There are several sizes available, from smaller ones for many still photography applications to larger bags used in large-format still photography or film making, which may need to hold both a magazine and a can of film stock which each have a 1000-foot capacity. Larger changing bag sizes are also available as "changing tents", where the top of the bag can be held in a dome-like configuration through the use of two curved rods.
