= Moviecam Compact =

Movie camera product line

- Variant models: Compact; Compact MK2
- Manufacturer: Moviecam
- Introduced: 1990 (Compact); 2004 (Compact MK2)
- Gauge: 35 mm
- Weight: 6.3kg/13lbs without magazine
- Movement: Compensating link movement with dual registration pins and dual pulldown claws, 3 or 4-perf pulldown, interchangeable aperture plates; pitch adjustment.
- Speed: Both models 1–50 frames per second (forward) and 12–32 frames per second (reverse – Moviespeed box needed). Both models crystal accurate to 0.001 frame/s.
- Aperture size: full range available
- Aperture plate: removable
- Motor: DC with quartz crystal control
- Operating noise level: Both models <20 dBA
- Indicators: speed, run, counter (ft or m), shutter angle, time code (user bit and sensitivity level), voltage, incorrect movement, asynchronous speed, low battery, film end, heater, film jam, loose magazine
- Lens mount: Arri PL (Super 35 compatible)
- Shutter: electronic reflex mirror; Can adjusted between 45° and 180° while in standby; manual model stops at 45°, 90°, 120°, 144°, 172°, 180°
- Viewfinder: 6.1x magnification; viewfinder is rotatable 360° while maintaining an erect image; 12" viewfinder with 2.4 x magnification zoom is available; heated eyepiece.
- Video assist: Flicker-reduced color or black-and-white CCD camera; on-board 1" monitor available.
- Ground glass: interchangeable
- Magazines: 500' (150m) and 1000' (300m) displacement style; all have built-in heaters and torque motors; mechanical and electronic footage counters. 400' (120m) lightweight Steadicam magazines with vertical displacement.
- Magazine loading: active displacement mags; takes up emulsion in (9P design).
- Film cores: standard cores
- Batteries: 24V

Moviecam Compact is a movie camera product line created by Moviecam in 1990. It was developed by Fritz Gabriel Bauer as an improvement on his Moviecam SuperAmerica.

== Description ==
Its potential applications are widespread, and it is regularly used on music videos, for commercials, in second unit work on features, for special effects shooting, and for motion control. It became the most popular 35 mm movie camera in general use because of its intuitive design, wide range of applications, high reliability and retail availability. In recognition of the Compact system's achievements, AMPAS awarded Moviecam a Scientific and Engineering Academy Award in 1993.

In 2004, Moviecam released the Compact MK2, with an updated drive system to improve longevity.

The Compact was used to film the horror movies Vampire in Brooklyn and Scream, directed by Wes Craven. The Compact MK2 was used to shoot The Ward, photographed by Yaron Orbach and directed by John Carpenter.

The Arricam systems, co-developed by Arri and Bauer, were inspired by the Compact and Arriflex 535 series in their design and mechanisms.

== See also ==
- Moviecam
- Moviecam SL – lighter version of Moviecam Compact series.
