= Moviecam SL =

Movie camera product line

Moviecam SL (SuperLight)
- Variant models: SL, SL MK2
- Manufacturer: Moviecam
- Introduced: 1996 (SL), 2004 (SL MK2)
- Gauge: 35 mm
- Weight: 3.5kg/7.8lbs without magazine
- Movement: Compensating link movement with dual registration pins and dual pulldown claws, 4-perf (both model) or 3-perf (SL MK2 only) pulldown, interchangeable aperture plates; pitch adjustment.
- Speed: Both models 2–50 frames per second (forward) and 12–32 frames per second (reverse – only for Compact magazines and with Moviespeed control box). Both models crystal accurate to 0.001 frame/s.
- Aperture size: full range available
- Aperture plate: removable
- Motor: DC with quartz crystal control
- Operating noise level: Both models about 25 dBA
- Indicators: speed, run, counter (ft or m), shutter angle, time code (user bit and sensitivity level), voltage, incorrect movement, asynchronous speed, low battery, film end, heater, film jam, loose magazine
- Lens mount: Arri PL (Super 35 compatible)
- Shutter: electronic reflex mirror; Can adjusted between 22.5° and 180° while in standby; calibrated with stops at 45°, 90°, 120°, 144°, 172°, 180°.
- Viewfinder: 6.1x magnification; viewfinder is rotatable 360° while maintaining an erect image; Also accept Compact viewfinders.
- Video assist: Flicker-reduced color (SL MK2 only) or black-and-white CCD camera; on-board 1'' monitor available.
- Ground glass: interchangeable
- Magazines: 400' (120m) displacement style; built-in heaters and torque motors; electronic footage counters. 400' (120m) lightweight Steadicam magazines with vertical displacement. Also accept Compact 400' (120m) and 1000' (300m) magazines by using a magazine adaptor.
- Magazine loading: active displacement mags; takes up emulsion in (9P design).
- Film cores: standard cores
- Batteries: 24V

Moviecam SL (SL stands for SuperLight) is a movie camera product line created by Moviecam in 1996. It is a lighter version of Moviecam Compact. It can use most of the same accessories as Moviecam Compact but allows for even easier shooting from the shoulder or with a support like Steadicam systems.

In 2004, Moviecam released SL MK2, with updated drive system, support of 3 perforations negative pulldown and new electronics.

== See also ==
- Moviecam
- Moviecam Compact
