= Re-can =

A re-can is a roll of film stock which was originally opened up from a factory-sealed can and loaded into a camera magazine by a clapper loader, but remained unshot and thus was unloaded back into a film can unused. A re-can will be placed in a black bag in a film can which is then sealed and identified as a re-can, as well as including the film type, emulsion number, and when it was unloaded. Identification is critical, as there may be no other way to know what exactly is inside the can. Re-cans should be sealed in either white or colored gaffer tape, depending on what (if any) color scheme is being used to identify film types; in any case, black gaffer tape should not be used, as it is considered the standard tape color used to seal exposed cans. If any of the roll has been shot, it is not considered a re-can, but rather a short end.

Re-cans are considered distinct from new rolls because they may have been subject to environmental conditions since leaving their originally sealed can and are no longer under factory warranty, and are generally identified distinctly to avoid any confusion in the matter. Assuming proper storage and fast turnaround time, they are considered perfectly usable. Older re-cans or ones of uncertain provenance should be clip tested first to check their condition. Re-cans and short ends are often sold at discounts to lower budget productions by labs, larger production companies, or businesses which specialize in their sale.

== See also ==
- Short end
