= Short end =

Partial roll of unexposed film stock

A short end is a partial roll of unexposed film stock left over during a motion picture production and kept for later use. The short end may be sold to a film dealer who will resell it to productions who are in a position to use it.

Short ends most commonly occur either when the film left in the camera magazine is shorter than the amount expected to be required for the next take or at the end of a shooting day when all of the day's exposed footage needs to be sent to the film lab. When this occurs, the clapper loader will break the roll at the loop protruding from the magazine; the exposed footage is placed in a black bag inside a film can, sealed, and labeled for film processing, while the unused short end will be placed in another black bag in a film can which is then sealed and identified by length, type, which original roll it came from, and when it was unloaded.

Without this identification, there is no other way to know what is inside the can. Short ends cans are usually sealed in either white or colored gaffer tape, depending on which color scheme is being used to identify film types. Black gaffer tape is not usually used, as it is the standard tape color used to seal exposed cans. If the footage will be needed very soon, the short end may be left in the magazine, and threaded through the magazine again as if it were a new roll.

If the entire roll has remained unshot and is to be unloaded back into a can, this is not considered a short end, but rather a re-can. Additionally, if the unshot footage is to be thrown away almost immediately, then this is considered waste footage. The term "short end" is used only if there is enough unexposed film left in the magazine to warrant using it to start a new magazine load, and if there is either a magazine or a film can available to store it in the interim. If there is nowhere the film can be kept safely away from any light, it may have to be wasted. Short ends may exist for a number of reasons, but usually they are either created at the end of a shooting day when the exposed film is unloaded to be sent with the day's rushes or at the end of a film shoot when there is still film left in the magazine on the movie camera. Additionally, particular film stock types might only have been used for a few scenes and thus have considerable short end lengths at the conclusion of their usage.

Short end minimum lengths vary depending on the needs of a production; professional productions usually prefer to waste any quantities less than 100 to 200 feet rather than constantly interrupt shooting to reload, while lower budget or student productions may be keen to use any amounts greater than 20 or 30 feet. The minimum length needs to be substantial enough to allow for the magazine to be loaded, the camera to be laced, and something to be shot, which usually will require at least ten feet prior to the shot. The maximum length of a short end is anything close the full length of a roll without counting as a re-can.

Short ends are distinct from fresh new rolls because they have often been subject to environmental conditions since leaving their originally sealed can and are no longer under factory warranty, and are generally identified separately to avoid confusion. Assuming proper storage and fast turnaround time, they are perfectly usable. Older short ends or ones of uncertain provenance must be clip tested first to check their condition. Re-cans and short ends are often sold at discounts to lower budget productions by labs, larger production companies, businesses which specialize in their sale, or occasionally still photographers who buy large rolls of film, and load them into their own 35mm canisters.
