= Interpositive =

Motion picture duplication film with an orange mask

An interpositive, intermediate positive, IP or master positive is a motion picture film with a positive image made from the edited camera negative. Interpositive film uses colored dye couplers that create an orange mask like the camera negative to preserve color accuracy.

== Description ==
From a traditional photographic perspective, an interpositive (short for intermediate positive) is the negative image of the original camera negative, which is an intermediate step towards creating the positive (exhibition) print.

The camera negative is projected onto negative film stock in a liquid environment - termed a wet gate - where the film stock is exposed using a contact process, so creating a like image (in effect, retaining the image in its negative—i.e. "reversed"—form) on negative film stock, as an intermediate step.

The interpositive historically had only one purpose, namely to be the element which is used to make the internegative.

The interpositive is made after the answer print has been approved. All lights and opticals from the answer print are repeated when striking the interpositive, and once the IP exists the original negative can be vaulted.

It is sometimes referred to as a "protection IP", since the only time the IP is touched is on the occasion of making the first or a replacement internegative. Since interpositives are used so rarely, they are usually the element that is in the best condition of all the film elements.

Historically, interpositives were the element of choice for film-to-tape transfers:

1. They are usually in better physical condition than the other film elements. The original camera negative is typically checkerboarded on several rolls, or may be chemically unstable if stored improperly.
2. They are very low-contrast and therefore were a better match for the dynamic range of older telecines.
3. Scratches or dirt on the IP appear as black defects on the transfer, which are generally less objectionable than white defects, which would be the case if the camera negative or internegative were used.

However, with improvements in resolution and dynamic range for home viewing, scanning the original camera negatives has become preferable.

Photographers who create photographic art by contact printing, such as Platinum or AZO, need interpositives in order to create large negatives. The final artwork has the size of the contact negative produced. Interpositives are also the best means of archiving or copying old image libraries. Reversal B&W processing can also be achieved from an interpositive by means of various kits and published recipes.

== See also ==
- Bleach bypass
