= Elizabeth Warham Forster =

American nurse (1886–1972)

- Born: December 23, 1886; Georgetown, South Carolina
- Died: January 1, 1972 (aged 85); Santa Fe, New Mexico
- Other names: Besty Forster
- Occupation: public health nurse
- Years active: 1913–1944

Elizabeth Warham Forster (23 December 1886– 1 January 1972) was an American nurse, who served on the Navajo Reservation, as a public health nurse for the tribe. She was innovative in that she encouraged the Navajo to use their traditional healing methods and rituals and saw them as complementary parts of the healing process. She later became the Colorado State Supervisor for the Emergency Recovery Administration. She was the long-time partner of photographer Laura Gilpin, who became noted for taking photographs of the Navajo, after Forster introduced her to their culture.

== Early life ==
Elizabeth Warham Forster, known as "Betsy", was born on December 23, 1886, in Georgetown, South Carolina to Farinda Carey (née Payne) and Charles Warham Forster. She was the middle child of five siblings: Alexius Mador Forster (1880–1954), Farinda Fairfax Forster (1882–1922), Emily Fairfax Forster Stuart (1888–1974) and Katherine Herbert Forster (1891–1905). Through her mother, the family was distantly related to George Washington. She enrolled in nursing courses at Union Memorial Hospital of Baltimore, Maryland and graduated in 1912. Continuing her education, she then studied public health nursing at Johns Hopkins University.

== Career ==
In 1913, Forster was hired by the Visiting Nurse Association in Colorado Springs and after two years was made a nursing supervisor. During the 1918 flu pandemic, she was hired by In 1918 Laura Gilpin′s mother to take care for her daughter, who was recovering from influenza. The two developed a deep friendship, based on many shared interests. By the end of the year, with Gilpin recovered, Forster left to work for the Red Cross. After serving for a year with that organization, she returned to Colorado Springs, and her supervisors job for the Visiting Nurse Association, where she worked until 1931.

In 1930, while on a camping trip with Gilpin, the two ran out of gas on the Navajo Reservation. Forster remained with the car visiting the people who came to inquire about helping them and ended up playing cards with them, while Gilpin hiked off to find petrol. Forster was deeply moved by the friendliness of the Navajo and immediately inquired about a job with them. She took a position in 1931 as a public health nurse in Red Rock, Arizona for the New Mexico Bureau of Indian Affairs (BIA). Upon her arrival at the reservation, she found that no provisions for either her own lodging, nor for medical supplies had been made. Securing a place to stay, she quickly adopted a position that her post would be a learning experience for her as well as the Navajo. She made daily nursing rounds, visiting families in their traditional dwellings and Gilpin often followed her around taking pictures.

Rather than imposing western medicine on her patients, Forster encouraged use of traditional healing methods and rituals as complementary practices to her own nursing methods. For example, during a birthing Forster described, she assisted the Navaho midwife, allowing the practitioner to take the lead and only adding a few hygienic measures to the process. As an advocate for the Navajo to retain their autonomy, she became vocal in her criticism of both the BIA and missionaries. She saw Christianization and forced education as detrimental to the self-determination of the tribe. The disagreement over whether medicine men should be condemned, resulted in Forster’s resignation in 1933.

Leaving the reservation, Forster accepted a position with the Emergency Recovery Administration in Park County, Colorado and was soon made a supervisor of the organization. She worked there until 1936, when the administration was terminated and then worked full-time on a turkey farm she and Gilpin had started in 1935. After three years, the farm failed and Forster opened a guest house which she operated until 1942, before returning to nursing work during the war. A health crisis occurred in 1944, which forced Forster to retire. She was diagnosed in August with encephalitis and after being hospitalized was also diagnosed with polio. Unable to care for herself, she was declared legally incompetent and was moved to her sister's home in Nebraska for care. After a year in recovery, the incompetency was annulled and Forster was well enough to join Gilpin at her new home in Santa Fe, New Mexico, though she was unable to resume working.

For the remainder of her life, Forster was cared for by Gilpin, who occasionally photographed Forster over the 50 years of their companionship. Near the end of her life, Gilpin had to hire professional care for Forster, but refused to place her in a nursing home.

== Death and legacy ==
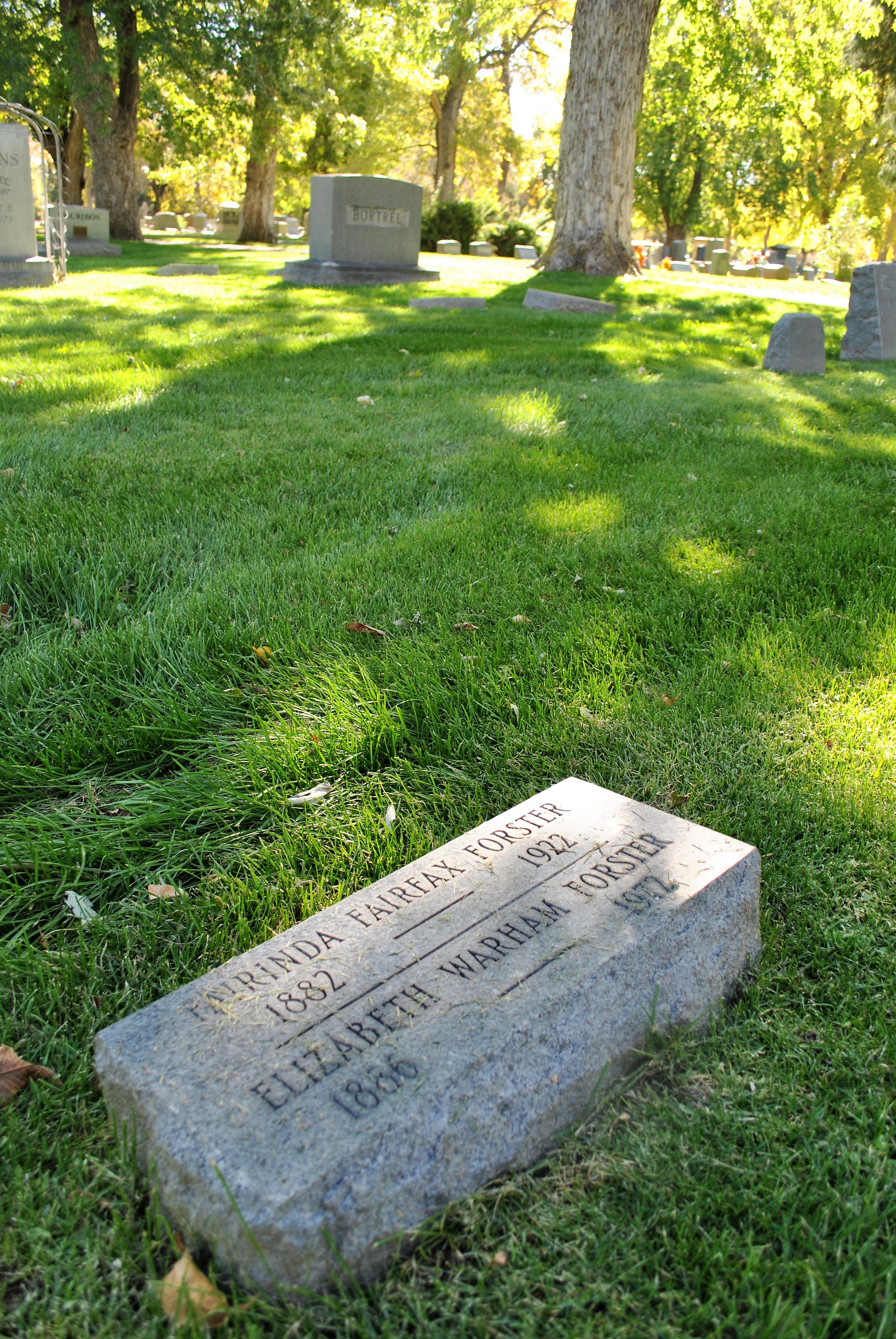
Evergreen Cemetery, Betsy Forster

Forster died on 1 January 1972 in Santa Fe, New Mexico and was buried at Evergreen Cemetery, Colorado Springs, along with her sister; Gilpin is buried in the same cemetery but in a different plot. Forster's deep affection for the Navajo people strongly influenced Gilpin's work and resulted in some of her most important photographs. Though at the time, her approach to cross-cultural-based public health work was rejected, today her work with the Navajo is seen as an important steppingstone and used by researchers in their analysis of both study and development of public health policy. In 1988, Forster's letters of her time among the Navajo were edited by Martha A. Sandweiss and published as Denizens of the Desert: A Tale in Word and Picture of Life Among the Navaho Indians. The book was supplemented with photographs by Gilpin.
