= Small format =

Small format is the group of film formats that are 35 mm or smaller.

Film gauges referred to as small format include:

- 35 mm format (Full Frame; FX)
- 24 mm format (DX)
  - Advanced Photo System (APS)
- 35 mm film / 135 film / full frame
- 16 mm film
- 8 mm film
- 1-inch digital (CX)

== See also ==
- Ultra Large Format, 10 inches and more
- Large format, 4 to 10 inches
- Medium format, 35 to 130 mm
- 828 film
- 126 film
- 110 film
