= Answer print =

An answer print is the first version of a given motion picture to be printed to film after color correction has been applied to an interpositive. It is also the first version of the movie printed to film with the sound properly synced to the picture.

Answer prints are created during the post-production process after editing, dubbing and other related audio work and special effects sequences have been finished or completed to a degree satisfactory for pre-release viewing. They are used by the filmmaker and studio to ensure that the work going into the film during the post-production process is cohesive with the final goals for the project. In effect, it is a post-edit editing where the filmmaker can observe and direct the course of the film's final look and feel as it pertains to color correction, sound and special effects elements and overall pacing. Pre-release screenings for test audiences are often run from late answer print copies of the film, because often the filmmaker is using the screening as a way to help direct final choices regarding the finished project.

When the last answer print is approved and finalized, it is used to make an internegative from which the release prints are struck.
