= Internegative =

Motion picture film duplicate

An internegative is a film-strip duplicate of the original motion picture. The colored counterpart to an interpositive. A low-contrast color image is used as the positive between the original camera negative and a duplicate negative.

After a film is shot, the original negatives—taken directly from the camera equipment—are edited into correct sequence and printed onto fresh stock as a cohesive film, creating an interpositive print used for color timing. From the interpositive, answer prints, which include the color-corrected imagery and a properly synced sound track, are made. Once approved by the studio, the final answer print is made into an internegative used for striking copies that will be delivered to theaters for viewing.

== Overview ==
Internegatives are the workhorses of the film industry. They are made on exactly the same stock as interpositives. The film processes usually go from one polarity to another, that is:

1. The camera operator shoots a positive image and the film ends up as a negative.
2. The original negative is printed onto stock that comes out as an interpositive. Often, two interpositives were made, one to be archived and one to continue through the process.
3. The interpositive is color timed (to balance the scenes) into the internegative.
4. The internegative makes the positive release print.

When an internegative wears out during printing, a new internegative is made from the interpositive and release printing resumes. There are some films (reversal film) that can go from positive to positive or negative to negative but are not used very often.

Each time the original camera negative, the only image source, is run through the printing machine, there is a hazard that the film could be damaged.

Printing release prints from the composited camera negative was common until about 1969. Thereafter, most printing was done from internegatives which were made from an interpositive.

Prints continue to be made from the composited camera negative. Usually such a print run is limited to a few prints. These are sometimes called "showprints" (a DeLuxe trademark), or, more generally, "EKs" (after Eastman Kodak), and are generally reserved for the producer and for exhibition in first-run engagements. Other exhibitors will almost always receive conventional prints made from internegatives.

For quality and safety reasons, video transfers are almost always made from an interpositive. An internegative is a less desirable alternative. On rare occasions, the composited camera negative may be used for video transfers, but it will have to be carefully retimed for color/density.

Where a color-reversal intermediate was used, a positive-to-positive color process could be achieved. However, its use was limited, often giving unsatisfactory color reproduction, and restricted to 16mm.

With very few exceptions, 35mm has utilized a negative-to-positive process.
