= Moviecam =

Austrian motion picture equipment company

Moviecam F.G.
- Type: Private (subsidiary of Arri)
- Industry: Motion picture equipment
- Founded: Vienna, Austria (1969?)
- Founders: Fritz Gabriel Bauer; Walter Kindler
- Headquarters: Vienna, Austria
- Products: Movie cameras

Moviecam is a motion picture equipment company specializing in movie camera systems for 35 mm film.

Moviecam is a motion picture Large Format Lens series released by ARRI Rental in 2021. There are 10 prime lenses ranging from 16mm to 135mm, all T2 except 100mm and 135mm T2.8.

== History ==
Originally started in Vienna, Austria as an in-house project of Fritz Gabriel Bauer and Walter Kindler's Moviegroup film production company in the late 1960s, the amount of research and development needed to create a new and modern motion picture camera system from scratch led to the formal creation of Moviecam as an independent corporate entity in 1976. Although only three camera models (SuperAmerica, Compact, and SL) were produced in significant quantities for international usage, the high-quality camera design, simplicity of usage compared to the contemporary models of Arri and Panavision, and integration of modern and pioneering camera features led to widespread usage in the film industry. Arri subsequently bought the company in the 1990s. At Arri, Bauer developed, together with Walter Trauninger and their camera development team, the Arricam System, which combined the basic movement and design of the Moviecam systems with the precision electronic parts and complement of camera accessories already designed by Arri.

== Content ==
The Arricam cameras were released in 2000 and remain the flagship camera line of Arri's 35-mm products. Although Moviecam cameras have not been manufactured for almost ten years, they have been used in feature film shoots due to the utility of their features.

In 2010, Moviecam released a camera focusing tool called Moviecam EasyFocus, a high precision measuring system with safe laser, for crane shot usage, etc.

== Products ==
=== Camera lines ===
- Moviecam 1 (1976)
- Moviecam 2 (1976)
- Moviecam 3N (1980)
- Moviecam Super/SuperAmerica (1984)
- Moviecam Compact (1990)
- Moviecam Superlight (1996)
- Moviecam Compact MK2 (2004)

=== Accessories ===
- Moviecam EasyFocus (2010)
