= Developing tank =

Light-tight container used for developing film

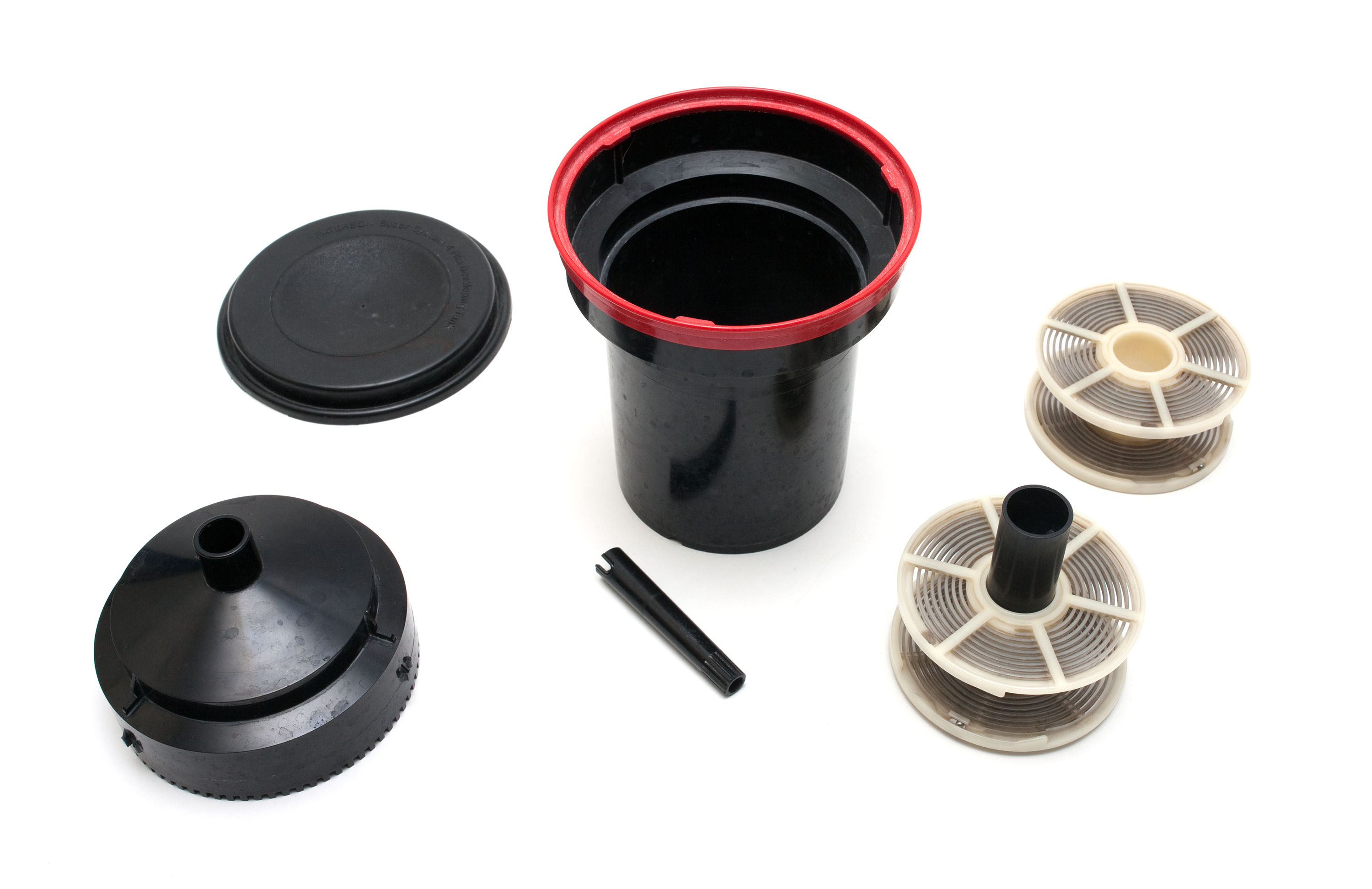
A Paterson System 4 developing tank

A developing tank is a light-tight container used for developing film. A developing tank allows photographic film to be developed in a daylight environment. This is necessary because most film is panchromatic and therefore can not be exposed to any light during processing. Depending upon the size and type, a developing tank can hold one to many roll or sheet films. Famous brands include Paterson, Yankee, Jobo and Nikor.

A film reel holds roll films in a spiral shape. The film is held evenly spaced so that the chemicals in the developing tank reach all of the film.

== Types ==
=== General ===
General tank support 110,126,135,120,620 format films Developing tanks and film reels for roll films come in two varieties: plastic and stainless steel. With stainless steel reels, the film is clipped to the center and then gently pinched while the reel is turned so that the film falls into the reel's grooves. With a plastic reel, the film is loaded from the outside and then wound onto the reel by rotating the reel with a back-and-forth motion.

=== Special purpose ===
- Minox daylight development tank. Minox format film can be loaded in broad daylight without the use of a changing bag or darkroom.
- Meopta 16mm development tank. Used for 16mm film only. Film must be loaded in darkroom.
- Agfa Rondinax 35 and 60. Respectively used for 135 and 120 film formats. Can be loaded in broad daylight without the use of a changing bag or darkroom.

== Use ==
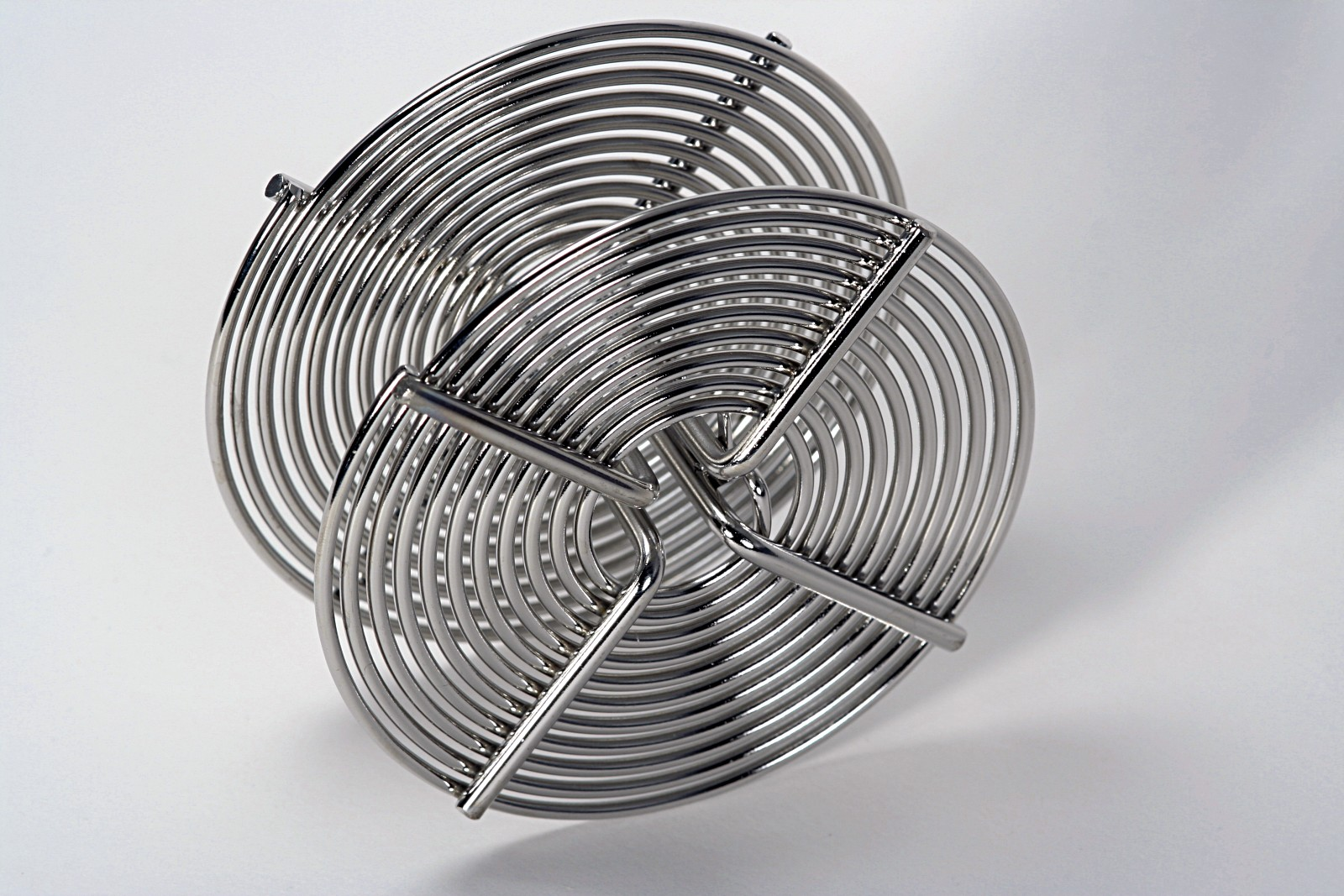
Stainless steel film reel for 35 mm film

The user begins by opening the film canister (in the case of 35 mm film) or separating the film from a paper backing (in the case of medium format film, e.g. 120/220 format). The film is then loaded onto a film reel in a completely dark environment; this can be a light-tight room or a changing bag. Care must be taken during this step, as improperly loading the film may result in parts of the film not getting developed. Once the film is on the reel it is put into the developing tank, and then a lid is placed on the developing tank. Because the lid prevents light from reaching the film, the rest of the film developing process may be carried out in daylight. In addition to protecting the film from light, the lid contains an opening for rapidly pouring liquids into and out of the developing tank. Finally, a separate cap seals the canister, which prevents the contents of the tank from spilling when agitated by inverting the tank. But the tank should be cleaned by water every time after development as any residual fixer may not lead to proper development of the next film.
