= Film can =

Container used to enclose film stock

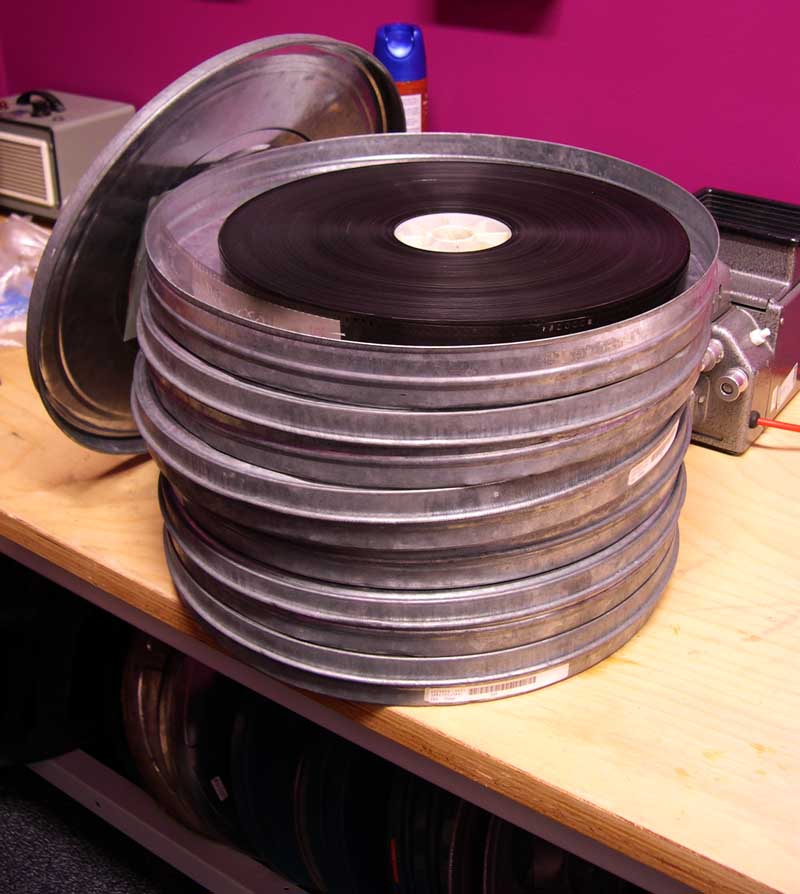
A 35 mm motion picture release print in the form that it would typically be delivered to a cinema. Each reel contains roughly 2,000 feet, or 20 minutes of running time at 24 fps in length.

A film can is the light-tight container used to enclose film stock. They are typically a circular box pressed from thin sheet metal, but plastic examples are also used. Film cans are used to hold unexposed film, exposed film ready for developing and also for the distribution of completed film prints. The last of these does not require the can to be light-tight, but environmental protection and exclusion of dust makes a similar container just as useful.

Cans of undeveloped film must only be opened in darkness, within a darkroom.

== Cassettes ==
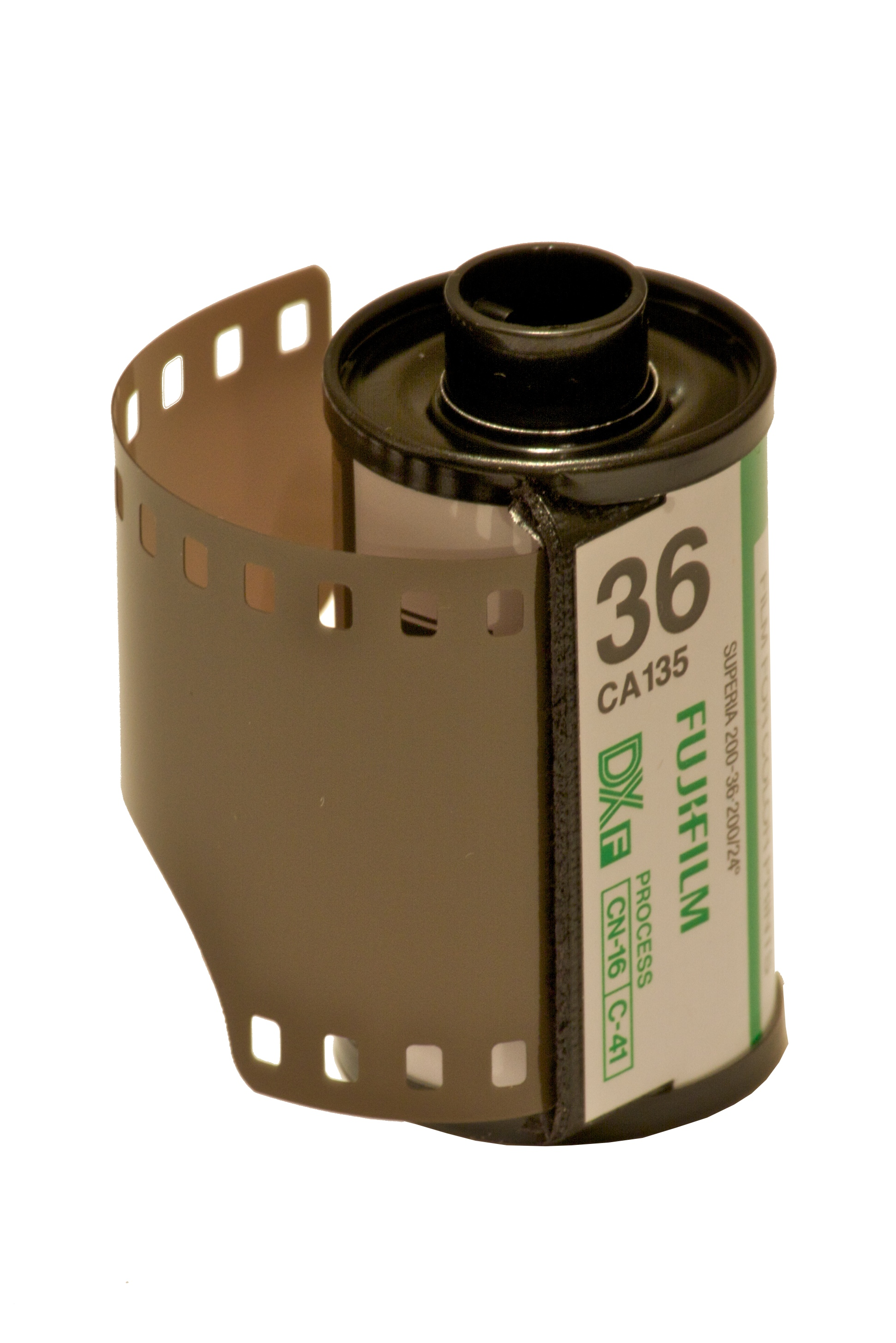
35mm still film cassette

A film cassette is similar to a film can in that it is a light-tight enclosure containing a spool of film. However a cassette also has a light trap, usually a set of lips covered with velvet, that allow film through without allowing light into the can. This allows a cassette to be loaded into a camera in daylight, then the camera back closed and light-sealed before use.

Cassettes are themselves stored in cans, to keep dust off the light trap. Dust caught in the velvet can scratch an entire roll of film. For 35mm film, these cans were once made from pressed aluminium with a screw top, now moulded plastic with a push fit lid.

== Bulk film ==
Most film is wound onto spools within the film can. Unexposed film supplied in bulk is commonly supplied unspooled, as a bare roll within the can. Before use, lengths of it are wound onto spools in a darkroom, then enclosed in cans or cassettes.

== See also ==
- Film cassette
