= Registration pin =

A registration pin is a device intended to hold a piece of film, paper or other material in place during photographic exposure, copying or drawing.

Registration pins are used in offset printing and cartography, to accurately position the different films or plates for multi-color work.

In traditional, hand-drawn animation, the registration pins are often called pegs, and are attached to a peg bar.

Also, in traditional, hand-taped printed circuit board artwork, usually at two or four times actual size. Sometimes on a single transparent base, usually mylar, with Layer 1 being on the front and Layer 2 being on the back, in red and green, respectively, for later separation into component parts using a process camera.

== Motion picture cameras and related applications ==
In motion picture cameras, the pin(s) hold the film still during exposure.

In certain professional motion picture cameras and step printers, there may be two registration pins: one referred to as the big pin, which provides primary (axial and lateral) registration while the other is referred to as the little pin, which provides secondary (axial) registration. With the big pin/little pin concept, it is not required to employ side pressure or other means to guide the film through the intermittent movement with absolute precision, as the big pin fills the perforation completely. The little pin does not completely fill the perforation in width, only in height; this difference accommodates slight changes in the dimensions of the film media due to changes in relative humidity or media age.

This system is employed primarily in high-end professional cameras in the West. In the East, especially countries of the former Soviet Union, a single registration pin, corresponding in function to the big pin, is employed along with side pressure.

Additionally, Western professional cameras employ Bell and Howell (BH) pins as a rule, whereas Eastern professional cameras generally employ Kodak Standard (KS) pins. The Kodak Standard was originally recommended by the Western standards organizations, but was soundly rejected by Western studios and camera equipment manufacturers. Western professional cameras provided to the East during World War II's Lend-Lease program were usuallt converted to KS pins by the receiving country.

To further improve registration accuracy, the perforations which are utilized for registration are not used for film advancement (i.e., for pull-down).

The above description applies to professional applications, which is generally taken to mean film gauges larger than 16mm (i.e., 35mm and 65/70mm).

For 16mm, usually only one registration pin is employed. Certain cameras and step printers which utilize 2R (two-row) perforations may employ the same strategy as for professional applications, but 2R is seldom utilized except for certain high-speed photography and almost never for duplication or prints.
