= Camera magazine =

Chamber to hold film

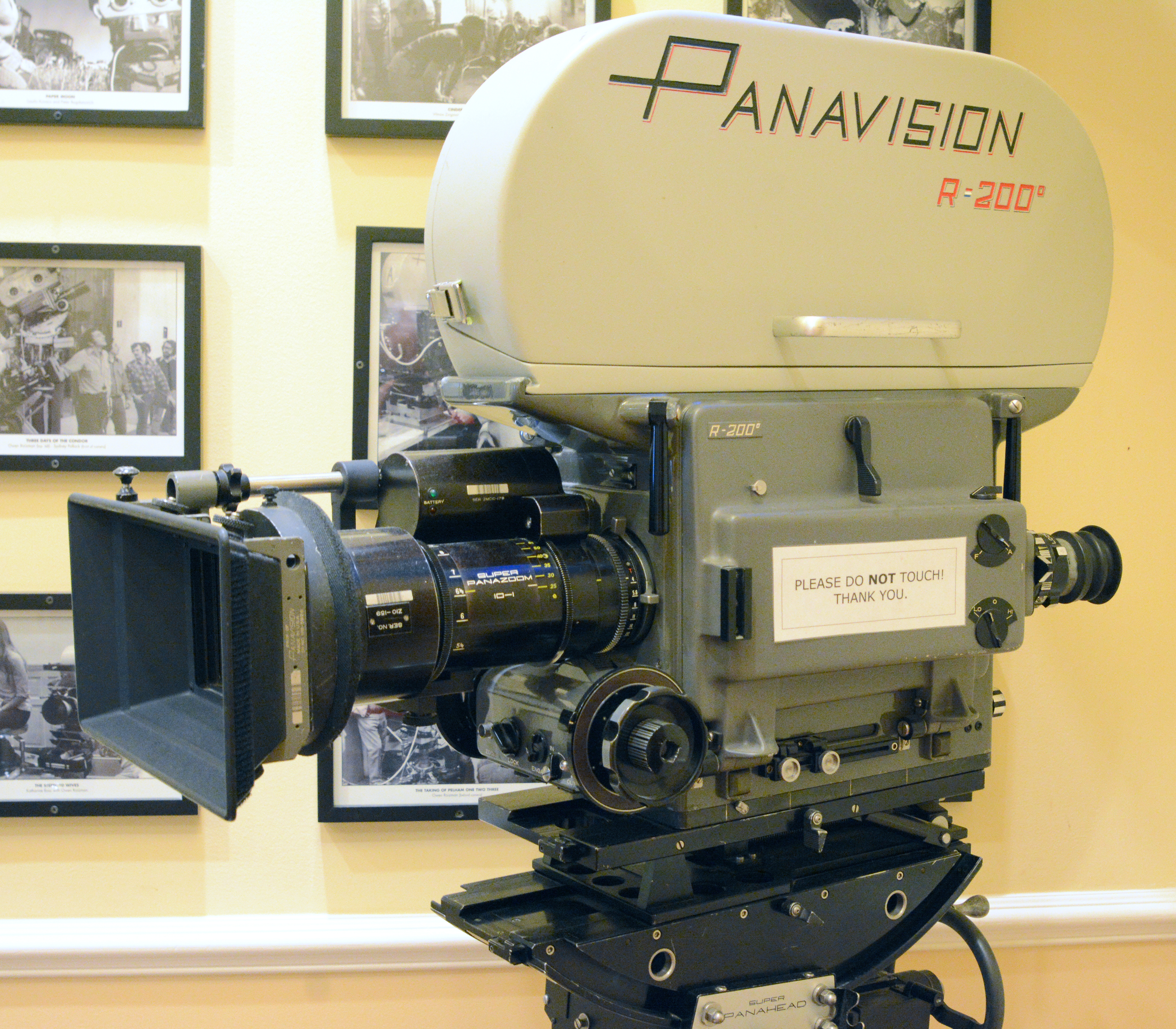
Panavision 35mm movie camera. The lighter color unit on top of the camera is the camera magazine, which can be removed to be reloaded by the clapper loader

A camera magazine is a light-tight chamber or pair of chambers designed to hold film and move motion picture film stock before and after it has been exposed in the camera. In most movie cameras, the magazine is a removable piece of equipment. Many still photo cameras also have removable camera magazines. A film cartridge serves the same function, but is usually not reusable.

== Lengths ==
In 16 mm filmmaking, most magazines are designed to accommodate up to 400 feet of film stock, which usually is the longest standard roll size available from film manufacturers (longer rolls can be made upon special request sometimes, but require special magazines). In 35mm filmmaking, there tend to be three common magazine types - 1000 foot magazines, which accommodate the longest standard roll size of 35 mm film; 400 foot magazines, which are often used when the camera is handheld in order to minimize the amount of weight upon the camera operator; and 400 foot Steadicam magazines, which are specially designed with a pair of moving spindles that gradually change position as the film rolls through the camera in order to maintain a steady center of gravity, which is advantageous for Steadicam operation. While this last magazine is not strictly necessary for Steadicam, usage of other magazine types may require frequent rebalancing of the rig in between takes due to weight shifting as the film progressively moves from one side of the magazine to the other. Use of 1000 foot magazines on Steadicam tends to be rare due to the larger amount of shifting weight and the greater total weight of the camera.

== Sections ==
All magazines are composed of a "feed" or "pay-out" side, in which the film is held before exposure (when it is "fed" into the camera) and a "take-up" side where the film is held after exposure. Furthermore, in between these two sides there are always two separate slots or throats where the film exits and then re-enters the magazine. These must also be designed to be light-tight enough to allow the film to exit the magazine without letting any light into the magazine itself, where it might fog the rest of the film inside. Various types of magazines handle the film in between the two sides differently. Aaton and Arri 16 mm cameras, as well as most 35 mm Arri models, require a fixed length "loop" which must be a certain number of perforations long and which moves the film with sprockets inside the magazine. Some more recent 35 mm cameras from Arri and all Moviecam and Panavision cameras, however, do not have any required loop size, and the film is not controlled with any sprockets in the magazine at all. Instead, the film is pulled through the camera solely through the power of camera sprockets until the end, at which point springs or belts in the camera magazine pull the film back to the take-up side.

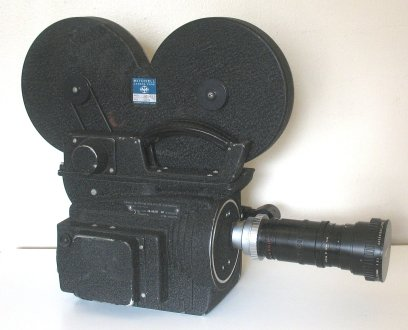
Modified 16mm Auricon Cinevoice CM-72A with Angenieux Zoom Lens and 400 foot Mitchell magazine

== Design ==
Another major categorization is the type of design: is the magazine one chamber or two chambers? If the latter, are the two horizontal or axial to each other? Most 35 mm camera magazines are one large chamber containing both spindles - usually the spindles are close enough together so that the feed and take-up rolls will just miss touching each other when the maximum length of film for that magazine is at its halfway point. Cameras with the single chamber magazine design include all Panavision and Moviecam cameras, most 35 mm Arri cameras, and all older 16 mm Arri cameras. Some old cameras, such as the Mitchell, have two separate chambers horizontal to each other, which looks very similar to a one chamber design. More popular today in two chamber design, however, are two chamber axial magazines, where the feed and take-up rolls (and thus chambers) are "stacked" one atop the other. Cameras with this magazine design in 16 mm include the Aaton and Arri SR models, and in 35 mm include the Arri BL and 535 models.

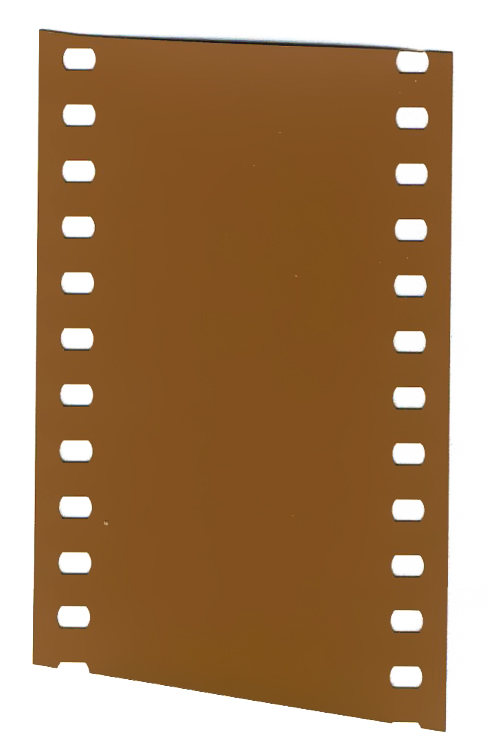
A short strip of undeveloped 35 mm color negative film, from a roll of film that is loaded into a 35mm camera magazine.

== Responsibility ==
The camera magazine tends to be held mostly in the charge of the clapper loader on set, who is in charge of loading and unloading the magazine, labelling it properly, securing it as light-tight, and delivering and receiving magazines from the focus puller, who attaches and detaches them from the camera and handles the threading of the film in the camera (certain magazines require no camera threading).

== Loading ==
Because of the length of motion picture film, the film usually is wound around a core, with no other exposure protection aside from its packaging or the magazine itself when loaded. Therefore, the loading of motion picture film must be done in a dark room or light-tight changing bag by the clapper loader. As the loader cannot see what (s)he is doing, the loader must already be familiar with the magazine prior to loading a "hot" (in usage) roll and able to go through with the loading operations only on touch. When learning, usually a loader will start by practicing with unusably fogged rolls ("junk" or "gash" rolls) in light and then try with junk rolls in a changing bag after feeling competent enough.

The advantage of using a two chambered roll becomes most apparent when loading. Since each chamber is light-tight, a loader only needs to load the feed side in darkness - once that chamber is secured, the remainder of the loading can take place in light. The small amount of film which is exposed on the take-up side would not be used for exposure under any design, and thus is not considered a significant loss of stock. Most two chambered axial magazines have fixed loop sizes, which adds some extra time to the loading procedure, but allows for magazines to be attached to the camera with minimal or no threading required. This can be a great advantage when filming requires reloading that takes only seconds.

Virtually all magazines are designed for the feed side to contain film stock wound with the emulsion facing inwards, which is the standard manufacturing wind. However, different magazines will takeup the film either with the emulsion facing out or facing in. Most magazines are emulsion in; Panavision magazines are a notable exception. Emulsion in and emulsion out are sometimes called "9P" and "99" respectively, referring to the relative appearance of a thread of film emerging from one side of core or the other.

== Labelling ==
Magazines which are loaded then need to be labelled properly in order to indicate what type of film is inside, how much is loaded, which magazine it is, and what the roll number is. Although different regions and types of filmmaking may have variants as to how this is done, generally larger budget feature films follow the following labelling convention:

1000' NR 5219 117 049.01 (27.4) M# 2314 R# C54

Where 1000' indicates the amount of film loaded (this can be indicated in meters instead, region depending); NR indicates "new roll" - otherwise it must be SE "short end" or RC "re-can"; 5219 is the manufacturer's stock code (in this case 35 mm Kodak Vision3 500T color negative film); 117 049.01 (27.4) are emulsion code numbers indicating the exact information of what batch of emulsion, printer, and cut the film came from - they are written on the film can and act as a "fingerprint" for the roll; M# 2314 is the serial number of the magazine itself; and R# C54 indicates that this the 54th roll of the "C" Camera.

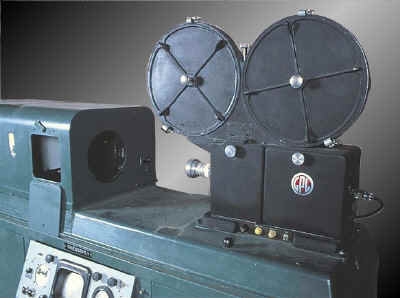
A PA-302 General Precision Laboratories (GPL) kinescope (c.1950–1955). Its movie film camera, bolted to the top of the cabinet, used Kodak optics, with a camera magazine on top of the camera.

== Securing ==
Magazines are designed to be light-tight in and of themselves. However, usually this is buffered by additional precautions made to maintain light-tightness, against both fault of equipment and humans. The latches used to open the magazine usually lock when closed and require non-casual fiddling to trip their locks. They are then furthermore protected by being taped up when loaded. Sometimes the entire edge of the magazine door is taped as an extra measure of light-tightness, although for newer properly maintained magazines this is not strictly necessary.

Magazines must also be checked thoroughly before usage against the creation of scratches in the emulsion. This is usually done during camera checkout at a rental house with what is known as a scratch test, where junk film is run through the camera and then examined against light for scratching.

On-set, cases with loaded magazines are often placed on standby near active cameras in order to facilitate fast magazine reloading with minimal lag time. Cases containing magazines often include an indicator of what is inside through the usage of colored stickers or magnets. The color indicates which type of film stock is inside. If the tape is normal and blank, it is a full magazine; if it is less than a full magazine, it will have the length loaded written on it. When a magazine ready to be unloaded is placed inside, the sticker from the new magazine freshly loaded is ripped and replaced as a sticker X to indicate that the magazine is "dead". If the magazine is pulled off with the intention of being put back on the camera without the take-up side first being unloaded, then the appropriate colored sticker will be placed on the case, and written with the amount of film left, followed by the word hot (to indicate that it is still in usage).

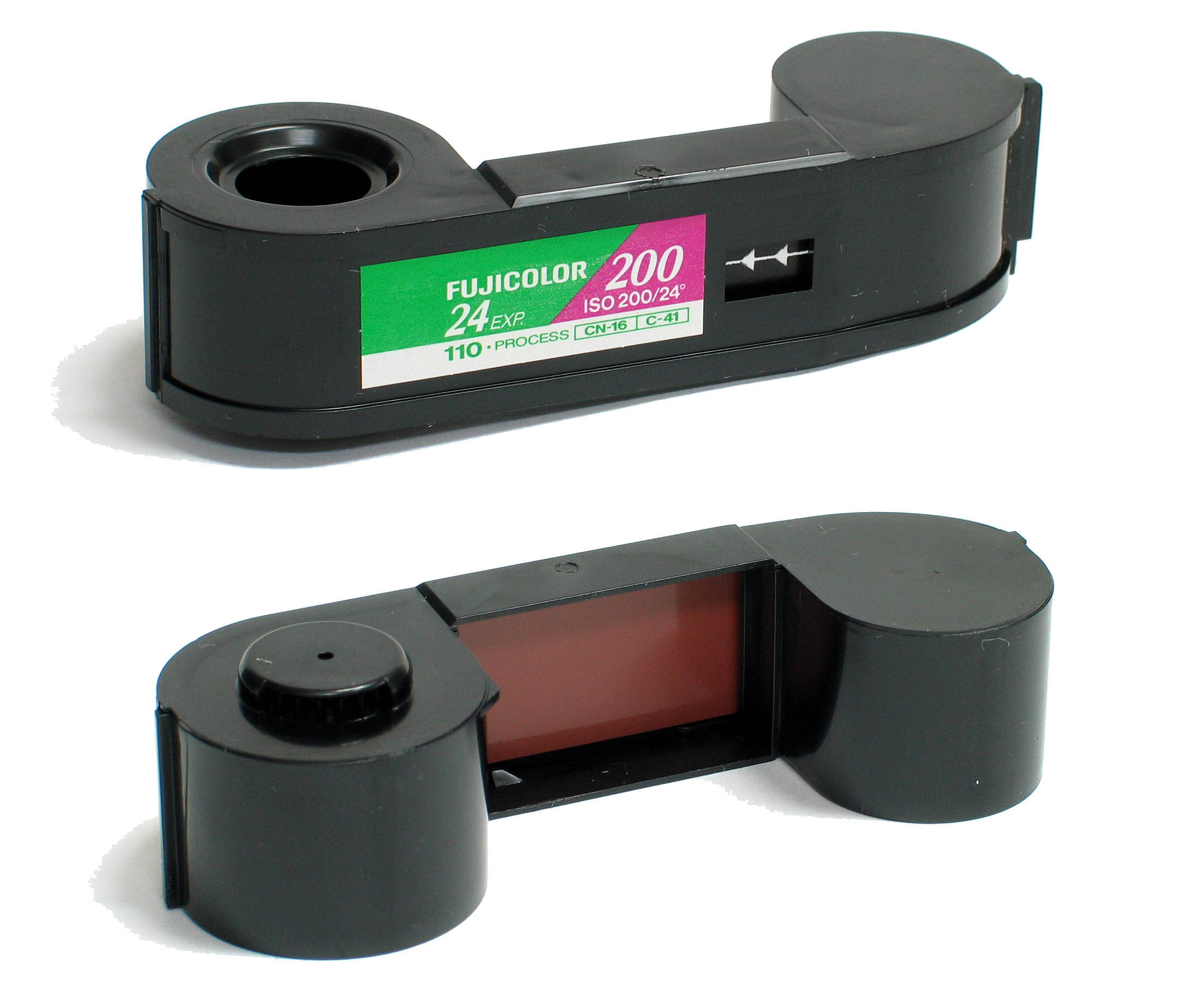
110 film cartridge is a non-reusable magazine (shown from front and from rear.)
