= Release print =

Copy of a film that is provided to a movie theater

A release print is a copy of a film that is provided to a movie theater for exhibition.

== Definitions ==
Release prints are not to be confused with other types of prints used in the photochemical post-production process:

- Rush prints, or dailies, are one-light, contact-printed copies made from an unedited roll of original camera negative immediately after processing and screened to the cast and crew in order to ensure that the takes can be used in the final film.
- Workprints, sometimes called cutting copies, are, like rush prints, copies of a camera negative roll, or from selected takes. A workprint may be roughly corrected for brightness and color balance. The prints are used for editing before the negative itself is conformed, or cut to match the edited workprint.
- An answer print is made either from the cut camera negative or an interpositive, depending on the production workflow, in order to verify that the grading ("timing" in American English) conforms to specifications, so that final adjustments can be made before the main batch of release prints is made.
- A showprint is a very high quality projection print made for screening at special events such as gala premieres. They were most important in the era from 1968 to 1997, after film laboratories began to switch from earlier processes like dye transfer (e.g., Technicolor) and contact positive to color reversal intermediate (CRI) internegatives to make release prints. The CRI process is faster, but to accommodate such speed, the resulting release prints were usually exposed at a "one lite [sic]" setting. This, along with other measures to cut costs in duplicating films at high speed, led to a noticeable decline in the quality of release prints during the 1970s and 1980s. In contrast, a showprint is usually printed directly from the composited camera negative, with each shot individually timed as a duplicate intermediate element would normally be, onto a higher quality of print stock than is usual for mass-production release prints (e.g., Eastman 2393 for showprints, and the standard 2383 for mass-production release prints). As a showprint is at least two generations closer to the composited camera negative than a typical release print, the definition and saturation in the projected image is significantly higher. During the era when CRI was prevalent, film critics were often reviewing showprints with greatly different exposure than what the general public would see. Showprints are colloquially referred to as "EKs" (for Eastman Kodak), since "Showprint" is a tradename of DeLuxe, although it is not a registered trademark.

== Workflow ==
=== Photochemical ===
In the traditional photochemical post-production workflow, release prints are usually copies, made using a high-speed continuous contact optical printer, of an internegative (sometimes referred to as a 'dupe negative'), which in turn is a copy of an interpositive (these were sometimes referred to as 'lavender prints' in the past, due to the slightly colored base of the otherwise black-and-white print), which in turn is a copy, optically printed to incorporate special effects, fades, etc., from the cut camera negative. In short, a typical release print is three generations removed from the cut camera negative. A check print is a type of release print used for checking the quality of release prints before they are made.

=== Digital intermediate ===
The post-production of many feature films is now carried out using a digital intermediate workflow, in which the uncut camera negative is scanned, editing and other post-production functions are carried out using computers, and an internegative is burnt out to film, from which the release prints are struck in the normal way. This procedure eliminates at least one generation of analogue duplication and usually results in a significantly higher quality of release prints. It has the further advantage that a Digital Cinema Package can be produced as the final output in addition to or instead of film prints, meaning that a single post-production workflow can produce all the required distribution media.

== Release print stocks ==
As of March 2015, Eastman Kodak is the only remaining manufacturer of colour release print stock in the world. Along with Kodak, ORWO of Germany also sells black-and-white print stock. Other manufacturers, principally DuPont of the United States, Fujifilm of Japan (the penultimate company to discontinue colour print stock), Agfa-Gevaert of Germany, Ilford of the United Kingdom and Tasma of the Soviet Union competed with Kodak in the print stock market throughout most of the twentieth century.

The person operating the printer on which the release print is struck must take several factors into consideration in order to achieve accurate color. These include the stock manufacturer, the color temperature of the bulbs in the printer, and the various color filters which may have been introduced during initial filming or subsequent generation of duplicates.

== Theatrical projection ==
At the theater, release prints are projected through an aperture plate, placed between the film and the projector's light source. The aperture plate in combination with a prime lens of the appropriate focal distance determines which areas of the frame are magnified and projected and which are masked out, according to the aspect ratio in which the film is intended to be projected. Sometimes a hard matte is used in printing to ensure that only the area of the frame shot in the camera that is intended to be projected is actually present on the release print. Some theaters have also used aperture plates that mask away part of the frame area that is supposed to be projected, usually where the screen is too small to accommodate a wider ratio and does not have a masking system in front of the screen itself. The audience may be confused when significant action appears on the masked-off edges of the picture. Director Brad Bird expressed frustration at this practice, which some theaters applied to his film The Incredibles.

== Production and disposal ==
Release prints are generally expensive. For example, in the United States, as of 2005, it typically cost at least US$1,000 to manufacture a release print, and that number did not include the additional cost of shipping the bulky release print to a movie theater for public exhibition. The cost of a release print is determined primarily by its length, the type of print stock used and the number of prints being struck in a given run. Laser subtitling release prints of foreign language films adds significantly to the cost per print. Due to the fear of piracy, distributors try to ensure that prints are returned and destroyed after the movie's theatrical run is complete. However, small numbers of release prints do end up in the hands of private collectors, usually entering this market via projectionists, who simply retain their prints at the end of the run and do not return them. A significant number of films have been preserved this way, via prints eventually being donated to film archives and preservation masters printed from them. The polyester film base is often recycled.

EKs (showprints) are even more expensive as they are almost completely made by hand and to much higher quality standards. Perhaps only five EKs will be made of a widely distributed feature, compared to thousands of standard prints. They are intended primarily for first-run and Academy-consideration theatrical runs in Los Angeles and New York City. This accounts for two of the typically five produced. Two EKs are usually reserved for the film's producer. The remaining EK is usually archived by the film's distributor.

Conventional release prints, which are made from timed internegatives, usually contain black motor and changeover cue marks as the printing internegatives are "punched" and "inked" for this specific purpose. Showprints, being made from the composited camera negatives, which are never "punched" or "inked", have white motor and changeover cue marks as these marks are punched (or scribed) directly on the prints by hand, in the lab.

== Gallery ==
Release Prints
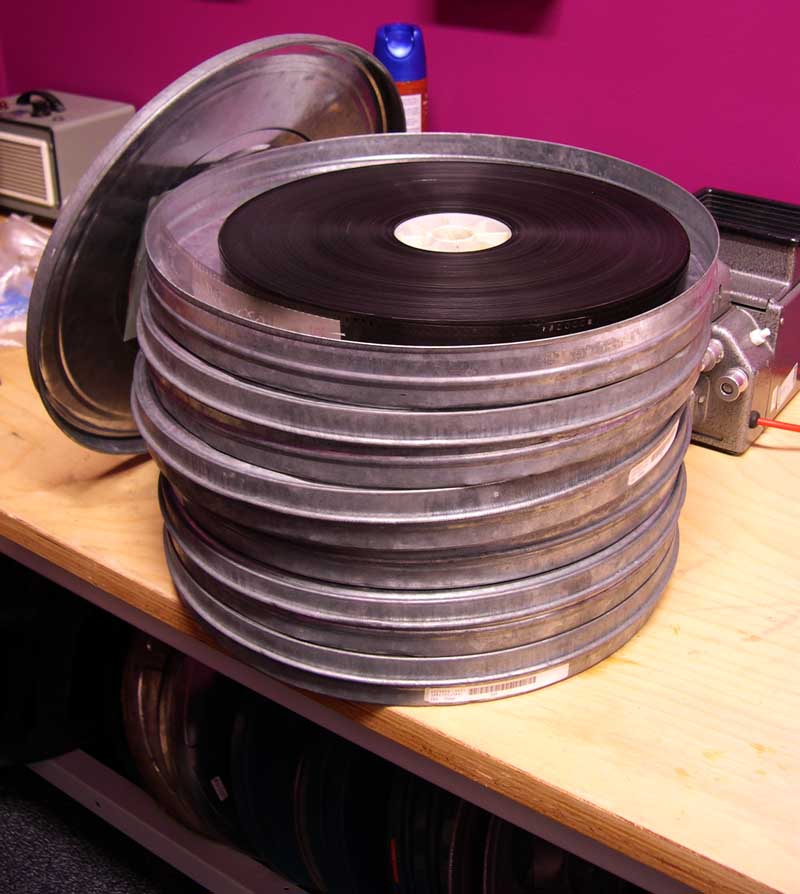
A 35 mm release print in the form that it would typically be delivered to a theatre in Europe. Each can contains roughly 2,000 feet of film, or 20 minutes of running time at 24 fps.

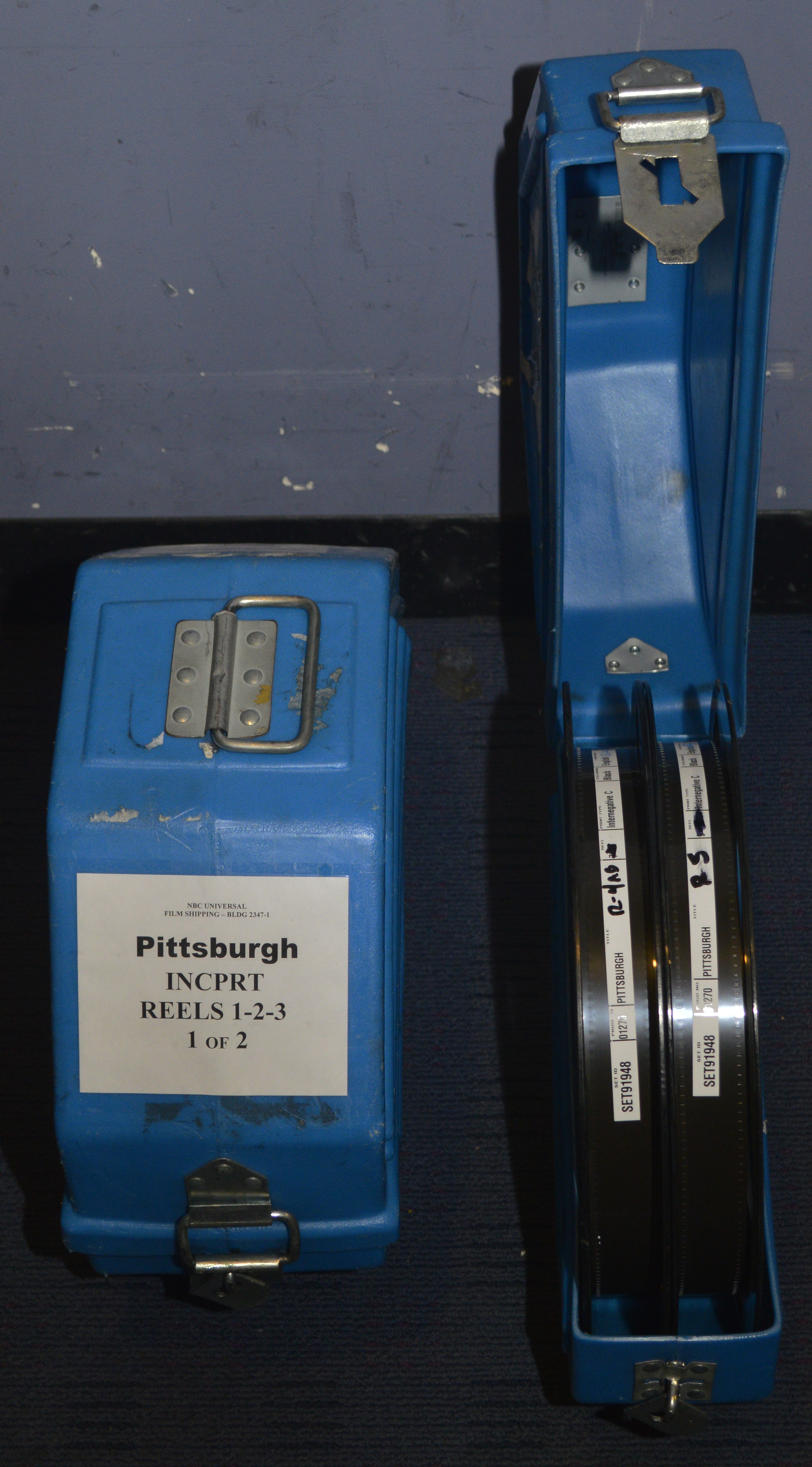
A 35mm release print in the form that it would typically be delivered to a theatre in the United States and Canada. Each 2,000 foot reel is held on a 4" core with clip-on plastic flanges, and held vertically in a plastic or steel container that can take between 2 and 4 reels.

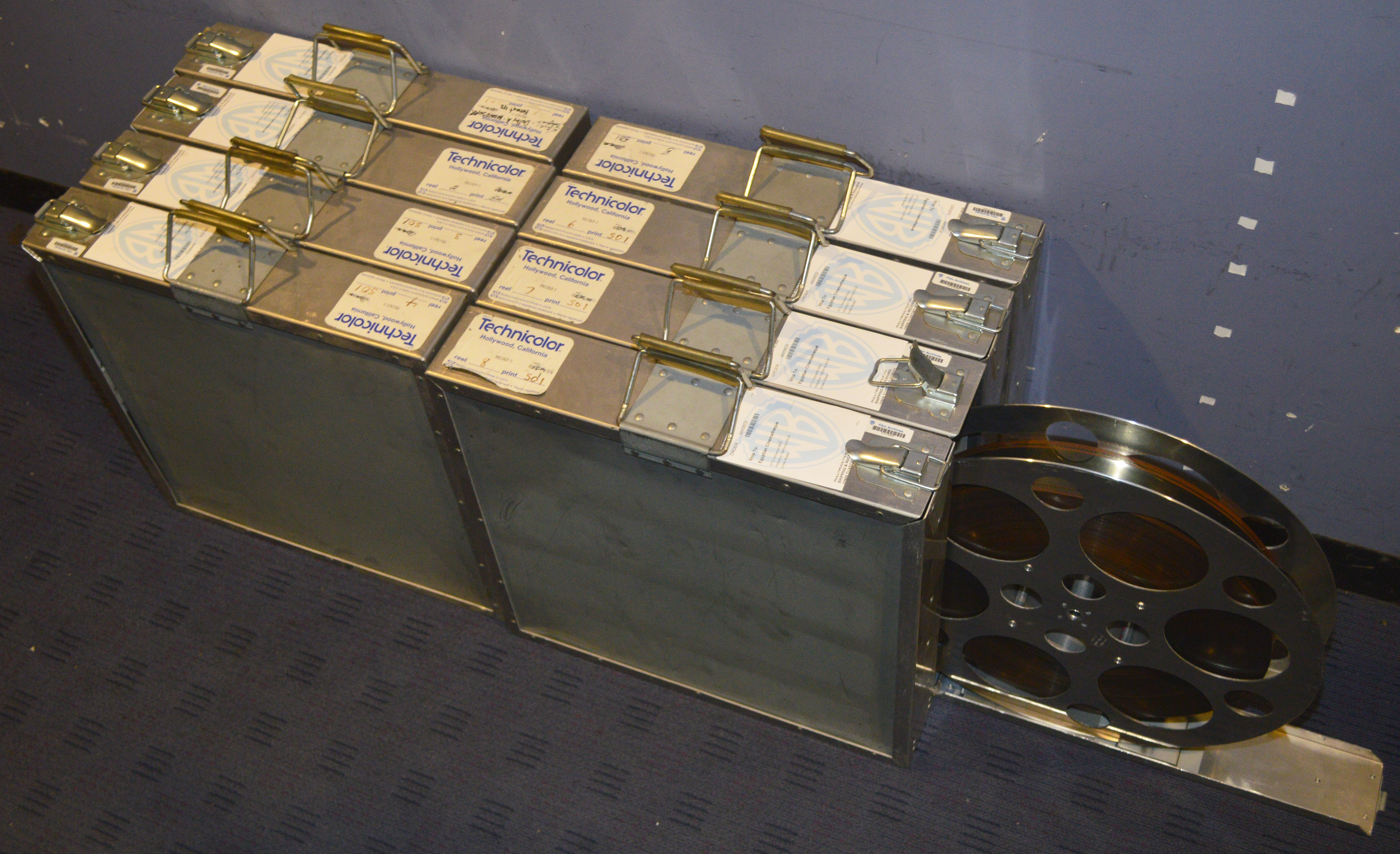
This photo shows the form in which 70mm prints are typically shipped to movie theaters worldwide. Each reel can hold up to 3,000 feet of acetate, magnetic-striped print stock. The weight of the film stock, steel reels and shipping containers make the cost of shipping significant, and is a major reason why the format has been in decline since the early 1990s.
