= Clapper loader =

Member of a motion picture filming crew

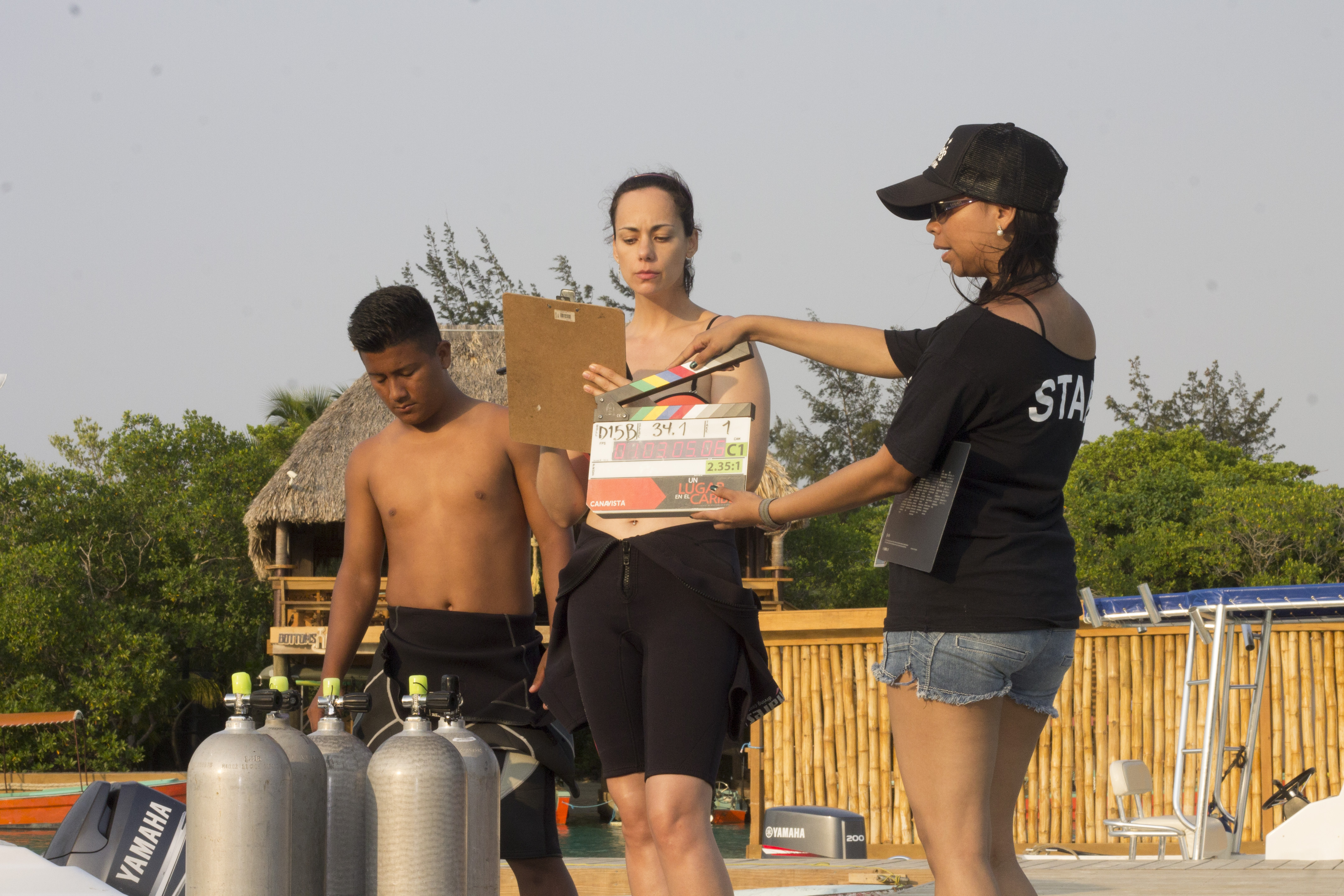
Clapper loader operating the clapperboard during the filming of A Place in the Caribbean (2017, Honduras)

A clapper loader or second assistant camera (2nd AC) is part of a film crew whose main functions are that of loading the raw film stock into camera magazines, operating the clapperboard (slate) at the beginning of each take, marking the actors as necessary, and maintaining all records and paperwork for the camera department. The name "clapper loader" tends to be used in the United Kingdom and Commonwealth, while "second assistant camera" tends to be favored in the United States, but the job is essentially the same whichever title is used. The specific responsibilities and division of labor within the department will almost always vary depending on the circumstances of the shoot.

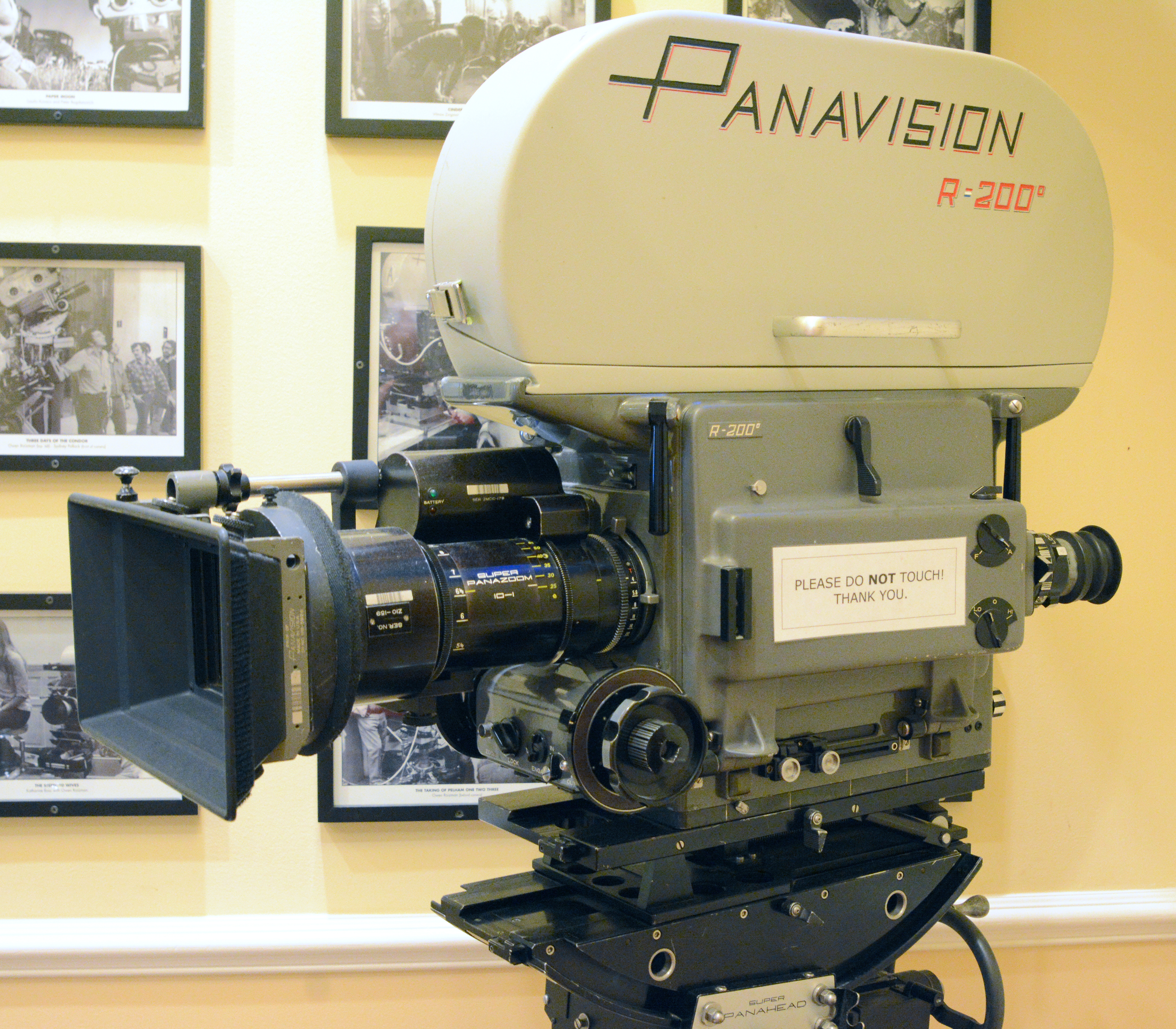
Panavision R-200 movie camera (through-the-lens Reflex, 200 degree shutter, hence R-200). The camera magazine is inside the lighter color "blimp" on the top of the camera; the camera head is inside the darker color "blimp" on the bottom; the camera magazine can be removed to be reloaded by the clapper loader

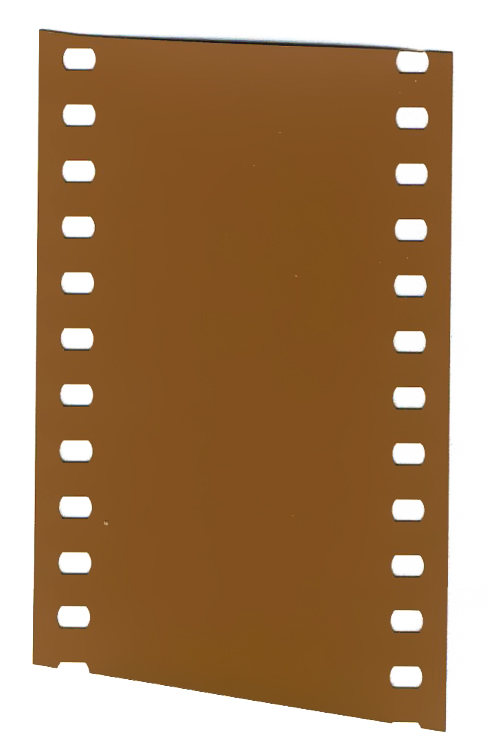
A strip of undeveloped 35 mm color negative film from a roll; B&W negative film is similar; "Negative" may be inferred from the BH style perforations.

== Functions ==
Clapper loaders have a very important role as practically the only people on set who directly and physically oversee the state of the undeveloped negative. The loader – the only person who actually handles the negative between the manufacturer and the laboratory – thus can easily render an entire day's work useless if the film is handled improperly. Additionally, the loader usually controls all records with regard to the film stock – from when it is received until when it is sent out to the lab; if this information is miscommunicated or missing, this too can destroy an expensive shoot. Furthermore, the loader usually has much more to do in addition to these tasks. Noted director of photography Oliver Stapleton has written on his website:

The LOADER loads the camera, oddly enough, with film made by either Kodak or Fuji. Loading may not sound like much of a job, but in actuality it is very important. If the wrong film is in the camera, or if it gets loaded twice, or lost, or put in the wrong can, then the scene which corresponded to: Scene 56 – The Army advanced over the hill, the jets dropped their bombs, and the volcano erupted... could be lost. When this happens the Loader can become deeply unpopular very quickly. Kubrick fired one loader I know on his first day of work for walking across the set holding a magazine upside down. Not Kubrick’s first day of work – the Loader's. This was a trifle harsh, but there is a right way to do the job, and the rules are there for a very good reason. If you screw up the minimum cost is about $20,000 and the max any figure you might care to imagine.

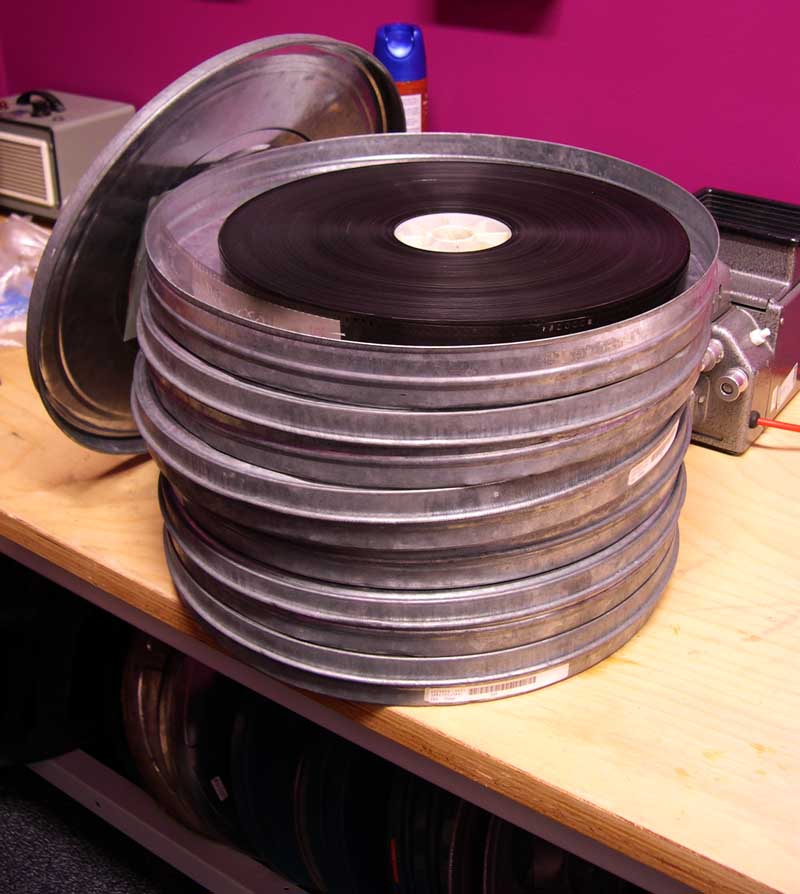
Each 35 mm roll contains a maximum of 2,000 feet, or 22.22 minutes of running time at 24 fps, with a customary maximum of 18–19 minutes.

== Duties ==
A full description of the job duties includes the following (although different shoots may often not always require all of these):

- generally assisting the rest of the camera crew (focus puller, camera operator, director of photography)
- utilizing the camera trainee, film loader, and/or camera runner if one has been brought onto the production
- keeping inventory of all equipment, film, and expendables
- requesting film stock as needed
- securing the equipment
- unloading/loading equipment off/on the camera truck daily if necessary
- checking loading materials and spaces to prevent light leaks
- cleaning and keeping clean the magazines and the loading environment
- organizing and cleaning the equipment space
- maintaining and cleaning the equipment
- loading and unloading of film stock from and to the magazines
- labelling of equipment, boxes, magazines, and storage spaces
- marking actors and props (leaving a marker of their positions as the scene is blocked for the purpose of measuring distance from the camera so that its focus can be adjusted throughout the scene)
- marking and operating the clapperboard properly
- keeping meticulous and accurate camera notes
- writing negative report sheets in detail
- interfacing with continuity in order to note which takes to print
- charging of batteries for camera and accessories
- preparation of film to be sent to the lab
- keeping records of time, per diems, and expenses for the entire camera crew
- liaising regularly with production, rental houses, editing, laboratories, and unions
- recordkeeping of all camera-related paperwork, including negative reports, daily stock reports, film inventory reports, lab orders, rental contracts, and expendable orders
- ensuring that all instructions from the director of photography are passed along properly to labs and post houses
- relaying reports from the lab about the rushes to the director of photography

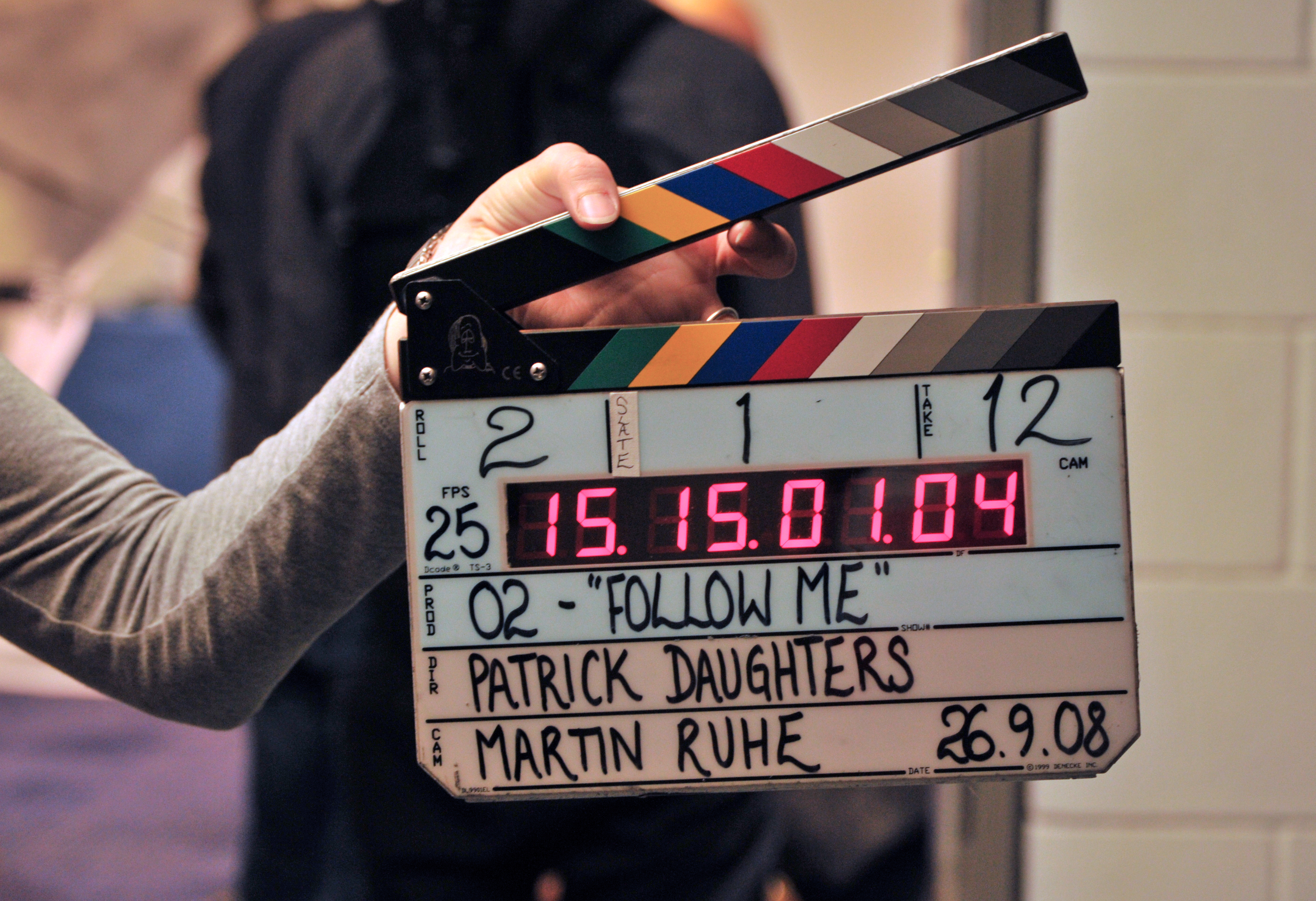
Digital Clapperboard
