= Open matte =

Filming technique

A frame from a 35 mm film print. Here, the picture is framed for the intended theatrical aspect ratio (inside the yellow box). The picture outside of the yellow box is matted out when the film is shown in widescreen. For 4:3 television and home media versions, a large portion of the picture can be used (inside the red box) with an open matte.

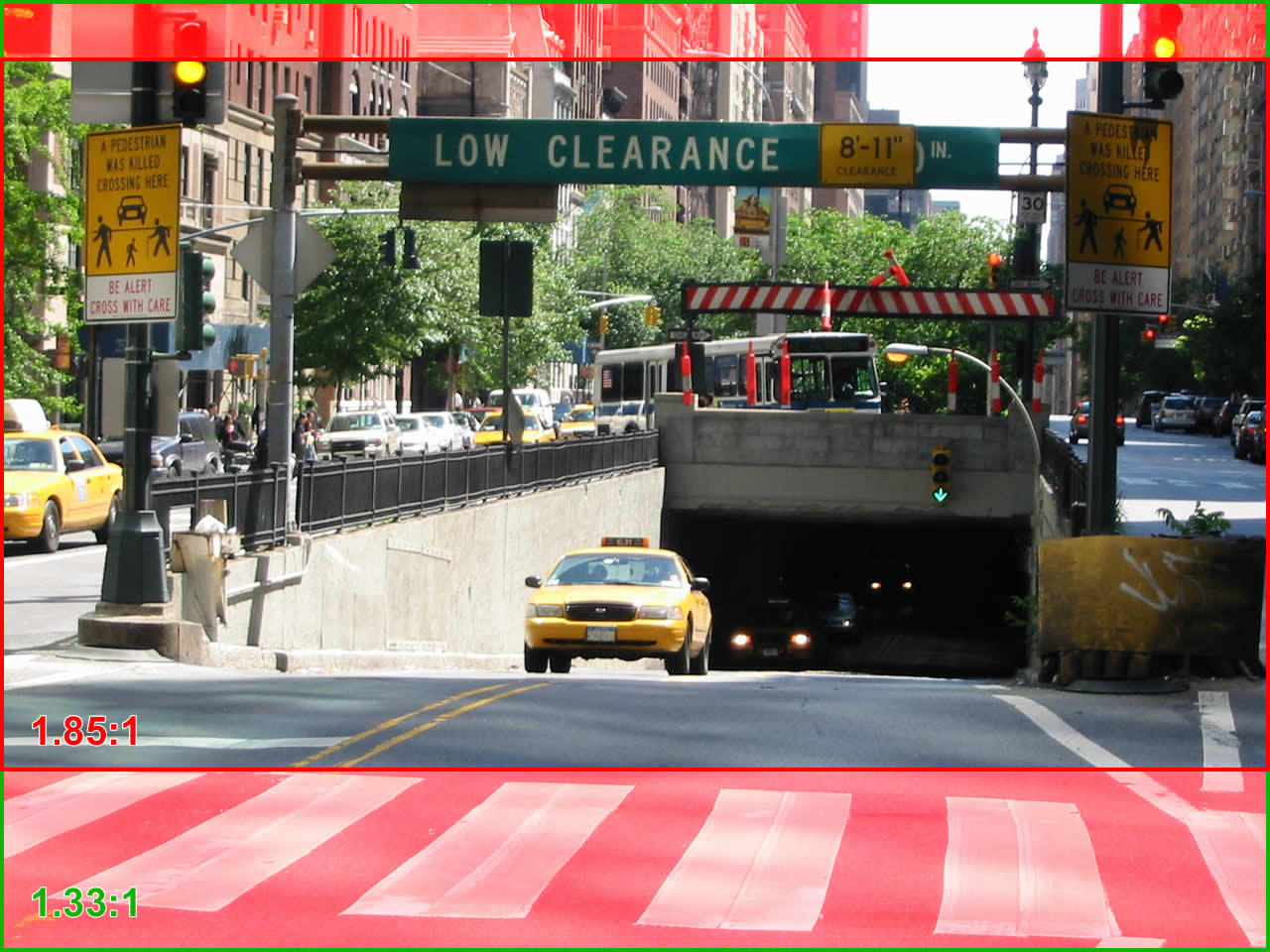
Open matte example with a slight shift of the image section upwards

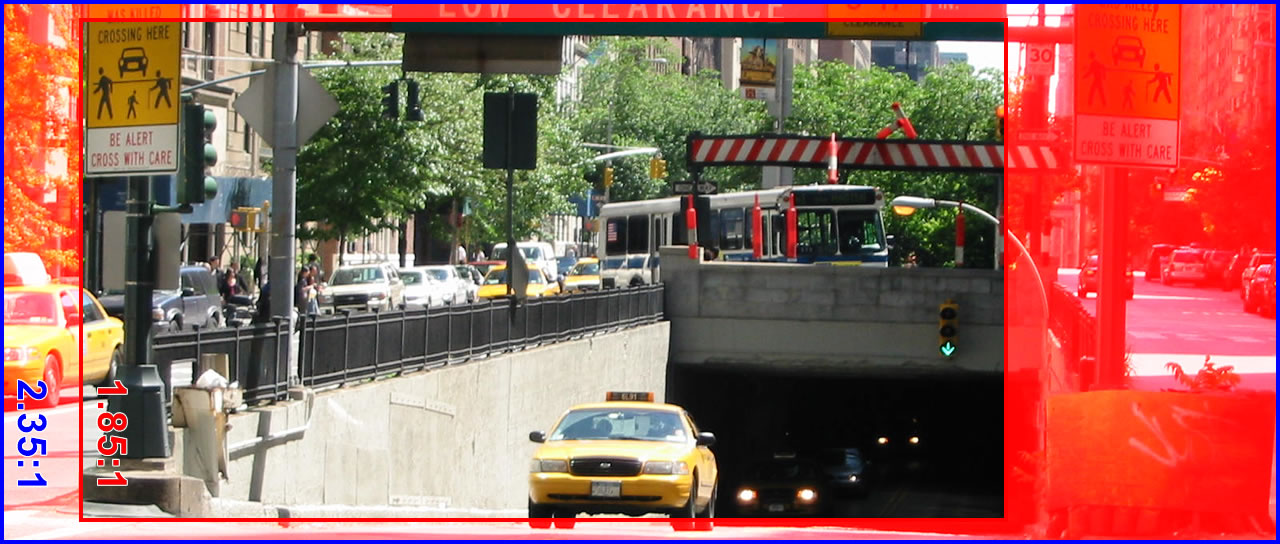
Aspect ratio 2.35:1 versus 1.85:1

Open matte is a filming technique that involves matting out the top and bottom of the film frame in the movie projector (known as a soft matte) for the widescreen theatrical release and then scanning the film without a matte (at Academy ratio) for a full screen home video release. It is roughly equivalent to an uncropped version of the film. This technique is intended to provide a better full frame presentation than cropping, with better convenience than pan and scan.

Open matte can be used with non-anamorphic films presented in 2.20:1 or 2.39:1, but it is not used as often, mainly because it adds too much additional headroom, depending upon how well the framing was protected or for aesthetic purposes. Instead, those films will employ either pan and scan or reframing using either the well-protected areas or the areas of interest. Films shot anamorphically use the entire 35 mm frame (except for the soundtrack area), so they must use pan and scan as a result.

== History ==
The rise of television and home media saw the use of a narrow aspect ratio of 4:3. To avoid letterboxing for broadcast releases, films were therefore reframed and cropped shot by shot to fit appropriately the full screen with the 4:3 aspect, with a process called pan and scan. Hence, only a cropped small portion of the theatrical frame was broadcast.

Many films over the years have used the open matte technique for home video releases and television broadcasts, the most prominent of which include the Back to the Future trilogy, the Jurassic Park trilogy, Schindler's List, Titanic, Top Gun, Willy Wonka & the Chocolate Factory, The Fugitive, Splash, Silverado and Predator, as well as many films that have been specially formatted for the IMAX expanded aspect ratio of 1.90:1 and 1.43:1. Stanley Kubrick also used this technique for his last three films The Shining (1980), Full Metal Jacket (1987) and Eyes Wide Shut (1999).

Films such as James Cameron's Terminator 2: Judgment Day (1991), Michael Bay's The Rock (1996), and Steven Spielberg's Minority Report (2002), all of which were shot in Super 35 also utilize the open matte technique, but this is mixed with pan and scan due to the visual effects being rendered in a wider aspect ratio.

== Open matte and pan and scan ==
Pan and scan is a process to optimise the film presentation for home viewing and television. For high-definition television, a combination of zooming and cropping is done to a portion of a frame, usually in accordance to the most important details in a shot. Pan and scan can be done on a scope (anamorphic, 2.40:1) master for a film, or even the open matte version.

Open matte helps in the pan and scan process, as there is more image to work with, and use the extra image on the top and bottom to fill a 16:9 display for HDTV broadcasts. Additionally, filmmakers may choose to release the open matte version for a film's "widescreen" home video release, such as with James Cameron's Avatar and the Blu-ray 3D release of Titanic.

== Usage ==
Usually, non-anamorphic 4-perf films are filmed directly on the entire full frame silent aperture gate (1.33:1). When a married print is created, this frame is slightly re-cropped by the frame line and optical soundtrack down to Academy ratio (1.37:1). The movie projector then uses an aperture mask to soft matte the academy frame to the intended aspect ratio (1.85:1 or 1.66:1). When the 4:3 full-screen video master is created, many filmmakers may prefer to use the full Academy frame ("open matte") instead of creating a pan and scan version from within the 1.85 framing. Because the framing is increased vertically in the open matte process, the decision to use it needs to be made prior to shooting, so that the camera operator can frame for 1.85:1 and "protect" for 4:3; otherwise unintended objects such as boom microphones, cables, and light stands may appear in the open matte frame, thus requiring some amount of pan and scan in some or all scenes. Additionally, the un-matted 4:3 version may often throw off an otherwise tightly framed shot and add an inordinate amount of headroom above actors (particularly with 1.85:1), depending upon how well the framing was protected or for aesthetic purposes. With high-definition television now in common usage (with its standardized 16:9 (1.78:1) aspect ratio), the need to reformat 1.85:1 movies for television viewing has virtually evaporated, although television broadcasts still reformat 2.39:1 movies by means of using open matte or pan and scan. For films with wider aspect ratios (2.39:1, for example) the matting bars will appear on the top and bottom of the screen of the broadcast image, thus preserving each director's framing intent.

== See also ==
- Shoot and protect
