= Academy ratio =

Aspect ratio with a width of 1.37:1

35mm film showing the Academy ratio in green, with the shorter 1.66:1 and 1.85:1 ratios shown inside

Academy ratio 1.375:1

The Academy ratio of 1.375:1 (abbreviated as 1.37:1) is an aspect ratio of a frame of 35 mm film when used with 4-perf pulldown. It was standardized by the Academy of Motion Picture Arts and Sciences as the standard film aspect ratio in 1932, although similar-sized ratios were used as early as 1928.

== History ==
Silent films were shot at a 1^{1}/_{3}:1 aspect ratio (also known as a 1.3̅:1 or 4:3 aspect ratio), with each frame using all of the negative space between the two rows of film perforations for a length of 4 perforations. The frame line between the silent film frames was very thin. When sound-on-film was introduced in the late 1920s, the soundtrack was recorded in a stripe running just inside one set of the perforations and cut into the 1.33 image. This made the image area "taller", usually around 1.19, which was slightly disorienting to audiences used to the 1.3̅ frame and also presented problems for exhibitors with fixed-size screens and stationary projectors.

From studio to studio, the common attempt to reduce the image back to a 1.3̅:1 ratio by decreasing the projector aperture in-house met with conflicting results. Each movie theater chain, furthermore, had its own designated house ratio. The first standards set for the new sound-on-film motion pictures were accepted in November 1929, when all major US studios agreed to compose for the Society of Motion Picture Engineers (SMPE) designated size of 0.800 in × 0.600 in (20.3 mm × 15.2 mm) returning to the aspect ratio of 1.33̅:1.

Following this, Academy of Motion Picture Arts and Sciences (AMPAS) considered further alterations to this 1930 standard. Various dimensions were submitted, and the projector aperture plate opening size of 0.825 in 0.600 in was agreed upon. The resulting 1.375:1 aspect ratio was then dubbed the "Academy Ratio". On May 9, 1932, the SMPE adopted the same 0.825 in × 0.600 in (21.0 mm × 15.2 mm) projector aperture standard.

All studio films shot in 35 mm from 1932 to 1952 were shot in the Academy ratio. However, following the widescreen "revolution" of 1953, it quickly became an obsolete production format. Within several months, all major studios started matting their non-anamorphic films in the projector to wider ratios such as 1.6̅, 1.75, and 1.85, the last of which is still considered a standard ratio along with anamorphic (2.39).

1.375:1 is not totally obsolete, nonetheless, and can still be found in select recent films such as Gus Van Sant's Elephant (2003), Steven Soderbergh's The Good German (2006), Andrea Arnold's Fish Tank (2009), Kelly Reichardt's Meek's Cutoff (2010), Michel Hazanavicius's The Artist (2011), Carlos Reygadas' Post Tenebras Lux (2012), Don Hertzfeldt's It's Such a Beautiful Day (2012), Paweł Pawlikowski's Ida (2013), Wes Anderson's The Grand Budapest Hotel (2014) and Asteroid City (2023), László Nemes' Son of Saul (2015), Paul Schrader's First Reformed (2017), Joel Coen’s The Tragedy of Macbeth (2021), Hlynur Pálmason's Godland (2022), and Chris Nash's In a Violent Nature (2024), as well on prints of Phil Lord, Christopher Miller's The Lego Movie (2014) and 4:3 prints of Steven Spielberg's Indiana Jones and the Kingdom of the Crystal Skull (2008) intended for 1.78:1 exhibition (a 2.39:1 version was also made).

== Technical details ==
The Academy ratio can be created in the camera, during printing, or during projection. In early 1932, Academy cameramen were instructed to begin using a camera aperture of 0.868 in × 0.631 in (22.05 mm × 16.03 mm), a ratio very slightly wider than 1.375:1, but using less image area on the film. Camera negatives would then have space for the optical soundtrack to be added in the married print, where thick frame lines would be added as well. Films were also shot using larger camera apertures and more of the image area. In all cases, these images would then be cropped to the appropriate size in the projector (0.825 in × 0.600 in) by means of aperture masks used in the projector's gate. While this ratio did catch on internationally, the camera and projector aperture size differed slightly between the ASA and ISO standards.

During filming, using the 4-perf frame for widescreen framing when spherical lenses are used is sometimes considered to be wasteful in terms of the cost of film stock and processing, especially in the case of television, which does not require a film print. The 3-perf pulldown process was originally proposed in 1973, developed by Miklos Lente in 1976, and further developed by Rune Ericson in 1986 to solve this problem.

== See also ==
- Fullscreen (aspect ratio)
- List of film formats
- Matte (filmmaking)
