= Film perforations =

Functional element in motion picture film

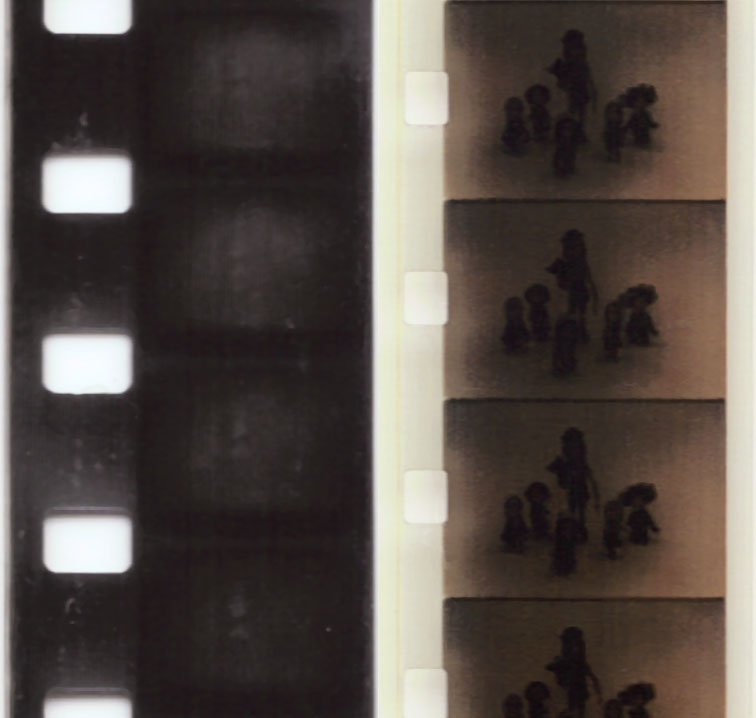
Perforations on Standard (left) and Super (right) 8 mm film

Film perforations (also known as perfs and sprocket holes) are the holes placed in the film stock during manufacturing at regular intervals. Perforations are used for transporting (by sprockets and pull-down claw) and steadying (by pin registration) the film when moving through a motion picture camera or film projector. Films may have different types of perforations depending on film gauge, film format, and intended usage. Perforations are also used as a standard measuring reference within certain camera and projection systems to refer to the size of the image in the frame. For instance, 35mm Academy is also known as 4 perf-35mm; VistaVision is 8 perf-35mm; Todd-AO 70mm film is 5 perf-70mm; and IMAX is 15 perf-70mm. Non-standard perforations also exist, especially on older and very early film formats, such as those produced by the Lumière brothers, or 9.5mm formats produced by Pathe-Freres.

== Characteristics ==
=== Pitch ===
One of the characteristics of perforations is their "pitch". This is the measurement of the distance between the tops of two sequential perforations. For 35mm and 16mm motion picture film, there are two different pitches—short pitch (camera stocks intended for duplication or printing, and for most intermediate applications) and long pitch (camera stocks intended for direct projection, print stocks, and special intermediate applications, as well as 135 still camera film). For 35mm film these are 0.1866" and 0.1870" (4.740mm and 4.750mm); for 16mm film they are 0.2994" and 0.3000" (7.605mm and 7.620mm).

This distinction arose because early nitrocellulose film base naturally shrank about 0.3% in processing due to heat, so film printing equipment was designed to account for a size difference between its (processed) input and (unprocessed) output. When cellulose acetate film was developed, which does not shrink, two forms were produced for compatibility with existing equipment.

=== Placement ===
All of the standard perforation systems place the perforations down either one side (Standard and Super 8, Super 16) or both sides (35mm and 65/70mm). Standard 16mm can be either single or double perf; some older cameras require double perf, but most can handle either. Because most cameras can handle both, and because of the increased popularity of Super 16 film, most 16mm stock manufactured today is single perf unless requested otherwise.

Some obsolete formats such as 9.5mm film and some variants of 17.5mm film used a single perforation in the middle of the frame line between each image. This is however considered a liability, since any sprocket or claw error will likely damage the center of the frame itself rather than the outer edges.

== 35mm perforations ==
The shapes and dimensions of 35 mm sprocket holes

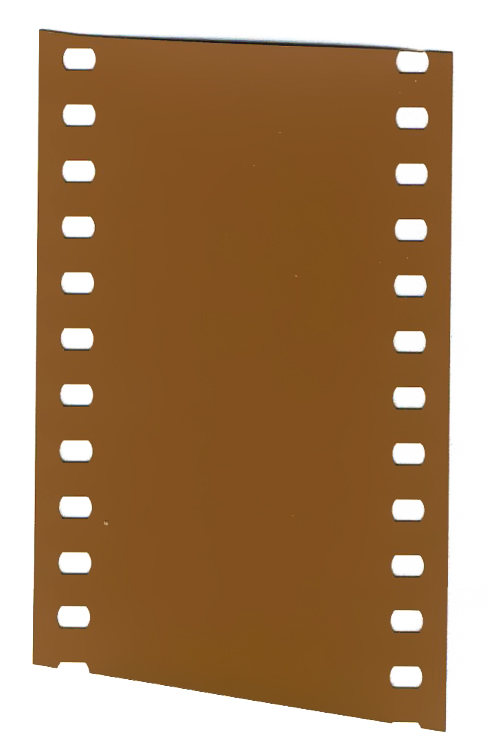
A short strip of 35mm camera film. Note the curved nature of its BH perforations

Additionally, for 35mm film only, there are several different shapes for these perforations.

=== BH ===
BH (Bell and Howell) perforations are used on camera negative film and have straight tops and bottoms with outward curving sides; they have been in use since the beginning of the 20th century. The BH perforation is a circle of approximately diameter 0.110" (2.79mm), with flattened sides giving a height of approximately 0.073" (1.85mm). The corners used to be sharp, but were slightly rounded in 1989 by 0.005" (0.127mm) to give them greater strength. The BH1866 perforation, or BH perforation with a pitch of 0.1866", is the modern standard for negative and intermediate (interpositive / internegative) lab film. The BH1870 perforation, or BH perforation with a pitch of 0.1870", was the original standard for positive prints intended for direct projection (release prints).

=== KS ===
KS (Kodak Standard) perforations were introduced in the 1920s to improve the life of projected film stock by eliminating the sharp corners which were prone to tearing. and thus are occasionally used for high-speed filming, but failed to displace BH perforations for filming operations prior to projection. KS perfs are rectangular with rounded corners, and measure 0.0780" (1.981mm) in height by 0.1100" (2.794mm) in width.

KS perforations were once recommended for negative and intermediate films, too, but only the Eastern Bloc countries (the Soviet Union and its satellites) adopted KS for these uses. The Western Bloc countries maintained BH perforations for negative and intermediate films, but adopted KS perforations for positive print films and for amateur films which were on a 35mm wide base.

This was one of the very few instances where a Western Bloc recommendation and standard was adopted by the Eastern Bloc, but was wholly rejected by the very bloc which proposed its adoption. To this day, all Western Bloc professional cameras employ BH perforations, and so also do the intermediate applications (interpositives and internegatives, also known as the IP/IN process).

One aspect of this particular adoption was that it effectively prevented amateur camera films from being "diverted" to professional uses, as KS-perforated camera film will indeed pass undamaged through a Western Bloc professional camera, but it cannot maintain the required registration accuracy as the KS perforation is too tall relative to the professional camera's BH-sized registration pin(s).

The increased height also means that the image registration was considerably less accurate than with BH perfs, which remain the standard for negatives. The KS1870 perforation, or KS perforation with a pitch of 0.1870", is the modern standard for release prints as well as for 135 still camera film.

65/70 mm, the other "professional" standard, was created many years after KS perforations had been recommended for negative as well as positive applications, and was adopted for positive applications. Consequently, 65/70 mm uses only KS perforations for all applications, negative, intermediate and positive.

=== DH ===
The Dubray Howell (DH) perforation was first suggested in 1931 to replace both the BH and KS perfs with a single standard perforation which was a hybrid of the two in shape and size, being like KS a rectangle with rounded corners and a width of 0.1100" (2.79 mm), but with BH's height of 0.073" (1.85 mm). This gave it longer projection life and also improved registration. One of its primary applications was usage in Technicolor's dye imbibition printing (dye transfer). The DH perf never caught on, and Kodak's introduction of monopack Eastmancolor film in the 1950s reduced the demand for dye transfer, although the DH perf persists in intermediate films to this day, such as long-pitch interpositives contact-printed from short-pitch negatives.

=== CS ===
In 1953, the introduction of CinemaScope—with its wider picture area and its use of four-track magnetic sound (four strips of magnetic tape coated on the film)—required another type of perforation. CinemaScope perforations are similar to KS perforations, but almost square in shape to accommodate the magnetic stripes. These perfs are commonly referred to as CinemaScope (CS) or "Fox hole" perforations, or simply "Foxholes" (because, initially, all CinemaScope films were made by 20th Century Fox). Their dimensions are 0.0730" (1.85mm) in width by 0.0780" (1.98mm) in height. Due to the size difference, CS perfed film cannot be run through a projector with standard KS sprocket teeth, but KS prints can be run on sprockets with CS teeth. CS-perforated stock has fallen out of use since the 1970s when 35mm prints with magnetic sound became uncommon.

== Small gauge perforations ==
=== 17.5mm ===
Standard 17.5mm magnetic film uses 35mm magnetic film which has been slit lengthwise into two equal widths and lengths before use. The "heads" of one-half of the 35mm donor become the "heads" of one 17.5mm length while the "tails" of one-half of the 35mm donor become the "heads" of the other 17.5mm length. 17.5mm magnetic film was used as a secondary "shop standard" at Paramount and Universal for location dialogue recording; it was most often run at 45 feet/minute, one-half of the usual 35mm magnetic film speed, thereby achieving a 4-to-1 increase in economy although at a significant sacrifice in sound fidelity, but adequate for monophonic dialogue. For stereophonic dialogue, conventional 35mm magnetic film was used.

For final mixing, the 17.5mm dialog was usually initially copied to a 35mm center track or full coat magnetic film element, whereby the dialog track entered the conventional mixing process as a second-generation 35mm duplicate.

17.5mm film, in this context, is for magnetic sound elements only, and only for very cost-conscious producers.

=== 16mm ===
All 16mm perforations are rectangles with rounded corners and are 1.27mm high by 1.829mm wide. The tolerance for these perforation dimensions was reduced to 0.01mm in 1989, which allowed 16mm camera manufacturers to slightly enlarge their registration pins and thus improve image registration and steadiness tolerances to less than 1/750th of the image height of the 16mm frame.

=== 8mm ===
Standard 8mm film uses 16mm film that is perforated twice as frequently (half the pitch of normal 16mm) and then split down the middle after development. Super 8 uses much narrower perfs on film which is already 8mm wide. Super 8 pitch is 0.1667" and perfs are 0.045" high by 0.036" wide.

== Damage and inspection ==
Damaged or broken perforations can lead to a tear in the film as it runs through the projector. Film is commonly checked for broken sprocket holes before presentation, a process known as "spooling". Mechanical devices exist for this purpose, but the classic method is to place the finger and thumb of a gloved hand on the edges of the film, which is mounted on a winding bench, and to slowly run the film through the fingers, feeling for snags.

== See also ==
- List of film formats
- Negative pulldown
- Super 35
- Sprocket hole photography
