= CinemaScope =

Early widescreen filming system

CinemaScope logo

CinemaScope is a cinematographic technique which used an anamorphic lens to produce widescreen pictures. Crucially, these could be shown in theatres using existing equipment (and an adapter). CinemaScope pictures were produced from 1953 to 1967, and less often after.

When 20th Century Fox began using CinemaScope, this marked the beginning of the modern anamorphic format in 2.55:1, almost twice as wide as the previously common Academy format's 1.37:1 ratio. Although the technology behind the CinemaScope lens system was made obsolete by later developments, primarily advanced by Panavision, CinemaScope's anamorphic format has continued to this day. In film-industry jargon, the shortened form, 'Scope, is still widely used by both filmmakers and projectionists, although today it generally refers to any 2.35:1, 2.39:1, 2.40:1, or 2.55:1 presentation or, sometimes, the use of anamorphic lensing or projection in general. Bausch & Lomb won a 1954 Oscar for its development of the CinemaScope lens.

== Origins ==
CinemaScope derives from a film process called Anamorphoscope developed by French inventor Henri Chrétien and patented in 1926. It used lenses that employed an optical technique called Hypergonar to produce an image twice as wide as those that were created with conventional lenses by compressing the image laterally during shooting and dilating it during projection. Chrétien attempted to interest the motion picture industry in his invention but, at that time, the industry was not sufficiently impressed.

By 1950, however, competition from television was causing a serious decline in cinema attendance. To combat this, Cinerama and 3D films were both launched in 1952. This persuaded Spyros Skouras, the head of 20th Century Fox, that technical innovation could buoy filmmaking against the television challenge. Skouras tasked Earl Sponable, head of Fox's research department, with devising a rival projection system that, unlike Cinerama, could be retrofitted to existing theatres at a relatively modest cost. Herbert Bragg, Sponable's assistant, remembered Chrétien's hypergonar lens.

The optical company Bausch & Lomb was asked to produce a prototype "anamorphoser" (later shortened to anamorphic) lens. Meanwhile, Sponable tracked down Professor Chrétien, whose patent for the process had expired, so Fox purchased his existing Hypergonars, and the lenses were flown to Fox's studios in Hollywood. Test footage shot with the lenses was screened for Skouras, who gave the go-ahead for development of a widescreen process that would become known as CinemaScope.

20th Century-Fox's pre-production of The Robe, originally committed to Technicolor three-strip origination, was halted so that the film could be changed to a CinemaScope production (using Eastmancolor, but processed by Technicolor). The use of the CinemaScope technology became a key feature of the film's marketing campaign. Two other CinemaScope productions were also planned: How to Marry a Millionaire and Beneath the Twelve-Mile Reef. So that production of the first CinemaScope films could proceed without delay, shooting started using the best three of Chrétien's Hypergonars, while Bausch & Lomb continued working on their own versions. The introduction of CinemaScope enabled Fox and other studios to respond to the challenge from television by providing a key point of difference.

Chrétien's Hypergonars proved to have significant optical and operational defects, primarily loss-of-squeeze at close camera-to-subject distances, plus the requirement of two camera assistants (the first for prime lens focusing, the second for anamorphic lens focusing)

Bausch & Lomb, Fox's prime contractor for the production of the lenses, initially produced an improved Chrétien-formula adapter lens design (CinemaScope Adapter Type I), and subsequently produced a dramatically improved and patented Bausch & Lomb-formula adapter lens design (CinemaScope Adapter Type II).

Ultimately, Bausch & Lomb formula combined lens designs incorporated both the prime lens and the anamorphic lens in one unit (initially in 35, 40, 50, 75, 100 and 152 mm focal lengths, later including a 25 mm focal length). The combined lenses continue to be used to this day, particularly in special effects units. Other manufacturers' lenses are often preferred for so-called production applications that benefit from significantly lighter weight or lower distortion, or a combination of both characteristics.

== Early implementation ==
CinemaScope was developed to use a separate film for sound (see Audio below), thus enabling the full silent 1.33:1 aperture to be available for the picture, with a 2:1 anamorphic squeeze applied that would allow an aspect ratio of 2.66:1. When, however, developers found that magnetic stripes could be added to the film to produce a composite picture/sound print, the ratio of the image was reduced to 2.55:1. This reduction was kept to a minimum by reducing the width of the normal KS perforations so that they were nearly square, but of DH height. This was the CinemaScope, or CS, perforation, known colloquially as fox-holes. Later still an optical soundtrack was added, further reducing the aspect ratio to 2.35:1 (1678:715). This change also meant a shift in the optical center of the projected image. All of Fox's CinemaScope films were made using a silent/full aperture for the negatives, as was this studio's practice for all films, whether anamorphic or not.

In order to better hide so-called negative assembly splices, the ratio of the image was later changed by others to 2.39:1 (1024:429). All professional cameras are capable of shooting 2.55:1 (special 'Scope aperture plate) or 2.66:1 (standard Full/Silent aperture plate, preferred by many producers and all optical houses), and 2.35:1 or 2.39:1 or 2.40:1 is simply a hard-matted version of the others.

A promotional poster advertising The Robe and CinemaScope. The small box in the center represents a regular-width screen. The curvature and width of the screen have been greatly exaggerated; Unlike Cinerama screens, CinemaScope screens were rectangular, and only 86% wider than standard ratio.

Fox selected The Robe as the first film to start production in CinemaScope, a project chosen because of its epic nature. During its production, How to Marry a Millionaire and Beneath the 12-Mile Reef also went into CinemaScope production. Millionaire finished production first, before The Robe, but because of its importance, The Robe was released first.

20th Century-Fox used its influential people to promote CinemaScope. With the success of The Robe and How to Marry a Millionaire, the process enjoyed success in Hollywood. Fox licensed the process to many of the major American film studios.

Walt Disney Productions was one of the first companies to license the CinemaScope process from Fox. Among the features and shorts they filmed with it, they created the live-action epic 20,000 Leagues Under the Sea, considered one of the best examples of early CinemaScope productions. Walt Disney Productions' Toot, Whistle, Plunk and Boom, which won an Academy Award for Best Short Subject (Cartoons) in 1953, was the first cartoon produced in CinemaScope. The first animated feature film to use CinemaScope was Lady and the Tramp (1955), also from Walt Disney Productions.

Due to initial uncertainty about whether the process would be adopted widely, a number of films were shot simultaneously with anamorphic and regular lenses. Despite early success with the process, Fox did not shoot every production by this process. They reserved CinemaScope as a trade name for their A productions, while B productions in black and white were begun in 1956 at Fox under the trade name, RegalScope. The latter used the very same optics as CinemaScope, but, usually, a different camera system (such as Mitchell BNCs at TCF-TV studios for RegalScope rather than Fox Studio Cameras at Fox Hills studios for CinemaScope).

== Audio ==
4-track magnetic audio track layout: Left, Center. Right and Surround/effects

Fox officials were keen that the sound of their new widescreen film format should be as impressive as the picture, and that meant it should include true stereophonic sound.

Previously, stereo sound in the commercial cinema had always employed separate sound films; Walt Disney's 1940 release Fantasia, the first film with stereophonic sound, had used Disney's Fantasound system, which utilized a three-channel soundtrack played from separate optical film. Early post-war stereo systems used with Cinerama and some 3-D films had used multichannel audio played from a separate magnetic film. Fox had initially intended to use three-channel stereo from magnetic film for CinemaScope.

However, Hazard E. Reeves' sound company had devised a method of coating 35 mm stock with magnetic stripes and designed a three-channel (left, center, right) system based on three 0.063-inch-wide (1.6 mm) stripes, one on each edge of the film outside the perforations, and one between the picture and the perforations in approximately the position of a standard optical soundtrack. Later it was found possible to add a narrower 0.029 in (0.74 mm) stripe between the picture and perforations on the other side of the film; this fourth track was used for a surround channel, also sometimes known at the time as an effects channel. In order to avoid hiss on the surround/effects channel from distracting the audience the surround speakers were switched on by a 12 kHz tone recorded on the surround track only while wanted surround program material was present.

This four-track magnetic sound system was also used for some non-CinemaScope films; for example Fantasia was re-released in 1956, 1963, and 1969 with the original Fantasound track transferred to four-track magnetic.

== Rival processes ==
CinemaScope itself was a response to early realism processes Cinerama and 3-D. Cinerama was relatively unaffected by CinemaScope, as it was a quality-controlled process that played in select venues, similar to the IMAX films of later years. 3-D was hurt, however, by studio advertising surrounding CinemaScope's promise that it was the "miracle you see without glasses." Technical difficulties in presentation spelled the true end for 3-D, but studio hype was quick to hail it a victory for CinemaScope.

In April 1953, a technique simply now known as wide-screen appeared and was soon adopted as a standard by all flat film productions in the US. In this process, a fully exposed 1.37:1 Academy ratio-area is cropped in the projector to a wide-screen aspect ratio by the use of an aperture plate, also known as a soft matte. Most films shot today use this technique, cropping the top and bottom of a 1.37:1 image to produce one at a ratio of 1.85:1.

Aware of Fox's upcoming CinemaScope productions, Paramount introduced this technique in March's release of Shane with the 1.66:1 aspect ratio, although the film was not shot with this ratio originally in mind. Universal-International followed suit in May with a 1.85:1 aspect ratio for Thunder Bay. By summer of 1953, other major studios Paramount, Universal, MGM, UA, Columbia, Warner Bros., RKO, Republic, Allied Artists, Disney, Belarusfilm, Rank, and even Fox's B-unit contractors, under the banner of Panoramic Productions had switched from filming flat shows in a 1.37:1 format, and used variable flat wide-screen aspect ratios in their filming, which would become the standard of that time.

By this time Chrétien's 1926 patent on the Hypergonar lens had expired while the fundamental technique that CinemaScope utilised was not patentable because the anamorphoscope had been known for centuries. Anamorphosis had been used in visual media such as Hans Holbein's painting, The Ambassadors (1533). Some studios thus sought to develop their own systems rather than pay Fox.

In response to the demands for a higher visual resolution spherical widescreen process, Paramount created an optical process, VistaVision, which shot horizontally on the 35 mm film roll, and then printed down to standard four-perforation vertical 35 mm. Thus, a negative with a finer grain was created and release prints had less grain. The first Paramount film in VistaVision was White Christmas. VistaVision died out for feature production in the late 1950s with the introduction of faster film stocks, but was revived by Industrial Light & Magic in 1975 to create high quality visual effects for Star Wars and ILM's subsequent film projects.

RKO used the Superscope process in which the standard 35 mm image was cropped and then optically squeezed in post-production to create an anamorphic image on film. Today's Super 35 is a variation of this process.

Another process called Techniscope was developed by Technicolor Inc. in the early 1960s, using normal 35 mm cameras modified for two perforations per (half) frame instead of the regular four and later converted into an anamorphic print. Techniscope was mostly used in Europe, especially with low-budget films.

Many European countries and studios used the standard anamorphic process for their wide-screen films, identical in technical specifications to CinemaScope, and renamed to avoid the trademarks of Fox. Some of these include Euroscope, Franscope, and Naturama (the latter used by Republic Pictures). In 1953, Warner Bros. also planned to develop an identical anamorphic process called Warnerscope but, after the premiere of CinemaScope, Warner Bros. decided to license it from Fox instead.

== Technical difficulties ==
A CinemaScope 35 mm film frame showing a circle. It has been squeezed by a ratio of 2:1 by an anamorphic camera lens. The anamorphic projection lens will stretch the image horizontally to show a normal round circle on the screen.

Although CinemaScope was capable of producing a 2.66:1 image, the addition of magnetic sound tracks for multi-channel sound reduced this to 2.55:1.

The fact that the image was expanded horizontally when projected meant that there could be visible graininess and brightness problems. To combat this, larger film formats were developed (initially a too-costly 55 mm for Carousel and The King and I) and then abandoned (both films were eventually reduction printed at 35 mm, although the aspect ratio was kept at 2.55:1). Later Fox re-released The King and I in the 65/70 mm format. The initial problems with grain and brightness were eventually reduced thanks to improvements in film stock and lenses.

The CinemaScope lenses were optically flawed, however, by the fixed anamorphic element, which caused the anamorphic effect to gradually drop off as objects approached the lens. The effect was that close-ups would slightly overstretch an actor's face, a problem that was soon referred to as "the mumps". This problem was avoided at first by composing wider shots, but as anamorphic technology lost its novelty, directors and cinematographers sought compositional freedom from these limitations. Issues with the lenses also made it difficult to photograph animation using the CinemaScope process. Nevertheless, many animated short films and a few features were filmed in CinemaScope during the mid-1950s, including Walt Disney's Lady and the Tramp (1955).

== CinemaScope 55 ==
CinemaScope 55 was a large-format version of CinemaScope introduced by Twentieth Century Fox in 1955, which used a film width of 55.625 mm.

Fox had introduced the original 35 mm version of CinemaScope in 1953 and it had proved to be commercially successful. But the additional image enlargement needed to fill the new wider screens, which had been installed in theatres for CinemaScope, resulted in visible film grain. A larger film was used to reduce the need for such enlargement. CinemaScope 55 was developed to satisfy this need and was one of three high-definition film systems introduced in the mid-1950s, the other two being Paramount's VistaVision and the Todd-AO 70 mm film system.

Fox determined that a system that produced a frame area approximately 4 times that of the 35mm CinemaScope frame would be the optimal trade-off between performance and cost, and it chose the 55.625 mm film width as satisfying that. Camera negative film had larger grain than the film stocks used for prints, so there was a consistent approach in using a larger frame on the film negative than on prints. While the image area of a print has to allow for a soundtrack, a camera negative does not. CinemaScope 55 had different frame dimensions for the camera negative and struck prints.

The negative film had the perforations (of the CS Fox-hole type) close to the edge of the film and the camera aperture was 1.824" by 1.430" (approx. 46 mm x 36 mm), giving an image area of 2.61 sq. inch. This compares to the 0.866" by 0.732" (approx. 22 mm x 18.6 mm) frame of a modern anamorphic 35 mm negative, which provides a frame area of 0.64 sq. inch. On the print film, however, there was a smaller frame size of approximately 1.34" x 1.06" (34 mm x 27 mm) to allow space for the 6 magnetic soundtracks. Four of these soundtracks (two each side) were outside the perforations, which were further from the edges of the print film than in the negative film; the other two soundtracks were between the perforations and the image. The pull-down for the negative was 8 perforations, while for the smaller frame on the print film, it was 6 perforations. In both cases, however, the frame had an aspect ratio of 1.275:1, which when expanded by a 2:1 anamorphic lens resulted in an image of 2.55:1.

A camera originally built for the obsolete Fox 70 mm Grandeur film format more than 20 years before was modified to work with the new 55 mm film. Bausch & Lomb, the firm that created the original anamorphic CinemaScope lenses, was contracted by Fox to build new Super CinemaScope lenses that could cover the larger film frame.

Fox shot two of their Rodgers and Hammerstein musical series in CinemaScope 55: Carousel, and The King and I. But it did not make 55 mm release prints for either film; both were released in conventional 35 mm CinemaScope with a limited release of The King and I being shown in 70 mm.

Subsequently, Fox substituted Todd-AO for its wide-gauge production process, having acquired a financial interest in the process from the Mike Todd estate.

Subsequent to the abandonment of CinemaScope 55, Century, which had made the 55/35mm dual-gauge projector for Fox (50 sets were delivered), redesigned this projector head into the present day 70/35mm Model JJ, and Ampex, which had made the 55/35mm dual gauge penthouse magnetic sound reproducer head specifically for CinemaScope 55, abandoned this product (but six-channel Ampex theater systems persisted, these being re-purposed from 55/35mm to 70mm Todd-AO/35mm CinemaScope).

Although commercial 55 mm prints were not made, some 55 mm prints were produced. Samples of these prints reside in the Earl I. Sponable Collection at Columbia University. Several 55/35mm projectors and at least one 55/35mm reproducer are in the hands of collectors.

CinemaScope 55 was originally intended to have a six-track stereo soundtrack. The premiere engagement of Carousel in New York did use one, recorded on magnetic film interlocked with the visual image, as with Cinerama. This proved too impractical, and all other engagements of Carousel had the standard four-track stereo soundtrack (sounded on the actual film) as was then used in all CinemaScope releases.

In 2005, both CinemaScope 55 films were restored from the original 55 mm negatives.

== Decline ==
Lens manufacturer Panavision was initially founded in late 1953 as a manufacturer of anamorphic lens adapters for movie projectors screening CinemaScope films, capitalizing on the success of the new anamorphic format and filling in the gap created by Bausch and Lomb's inability to mass-produce the needed adapters for movie theaters fast enough. Looking to expand beyond projector lenses, Panavision founder Robert Gottschalk soon improved upon the anamorphic camera lenses by creating a new lens set that included dual rotating anamorphic elements which were interlocked with the lens focus gearing. This innovation allowed the Panavision lenses to keep the plane of focus at a constant anamorphic ratio of 2x, thus avoiding the horizontally-overstretched mumps effect that afflicted many CinemaScope films. After screening a demo reel comparing the two systems, many U.S. studios adopted the Panavision anamorphic lenses. The Panavision technique was also considered more attractive to the industry because it was more affordable than CinemaScope and was not owned or licensed-out by a rival studio. Confusingly, some studios, particularly MGM, continued to use the CinemaScope credit even though they had switched to Panavision lenses. Virtually all MGM CinemaScope films after 1958 are actually in Panavision.

By 1967, even Fox had begun to abandon CinemaScope for Panavision (famously at the demand of Frank Sinatra for Von Ryan's Express, although a significant amount of the principal photography was actually filmed using CinemaScope lenses). Fox eventually capitulated completely to third-party lenses. In Like Flint with James Coburn and Caprice with Doris Day, were Fox's final films in CinemaScope.

Fox originally intended CinemaScope films to use magnetic stereo sound only, and although in certain areas, such as Los Angeles and New York City, the vast majority of theaters were equipped for four-track magnetic sound (four-track magnetic sound achieving nearly 90 percent penetration of theaters in the greater Los Angeles area) the owners of many smaller theaters were dissatisfied with contractually having to install expensive three- or four-track magnetic stereo, and because of the technical nature of sound installations, drive-in theaters had trouble presenting stereophonic sound at all. Due to these conflicts, and because other studios were starting to release anamorphic prints with standard optical soundtracks, Fox revoked their policy of stereo-only presentations in 1957, and added a half-width optical soundtrack, while keeping the magnetic tracks for those theaters that were able to present their films with stereophonic sound. These so-called "mag-optical" prints provided a somewhat sub-standard optical sound and were also expensive to produce. It made little economic sense to supply those theaters which had only mono sound systems with an expensive striped print. Eventually Fox, and others, elected to supply the majority of their prints in standard mono optical sound form, with magnetic striped prints reserved for those theaters capable of playing them.

Magnetic-striped prints were expensive to produce; each print cost at least twice as much as a print with a standard optical soundtrack only. Furthermore, these striped prints wore out faster than optical prints and caused more problems in use, such as flakes of oxide clogging the replay heads. Due to these problems, and also because many cinemas never installed the necessary playback equipment, magnetic-sound prints started to be made in small quantities for roadshow screenings only, with the main release using standard mono optical-sound prints. As time went by roadshow screenings were increasingly made using 70 mm film, and the use of striped 35 mm prints declined further. Many CinemaScope films from the 1960s and 1970s were never released in stereo at all. Finally, the 1976 introduction of Dolby Stereo – which provided similar performance to striped magnetic prints albeit more reliable and at a far lower cost – caused the four-track magnetic system to become totally obsolete.

== Modern references ==
The song "Stereophonic Sound" written by Cole Porter for the 1955 Broadway musical Silk Stockings mentions CinemaScope in the lyrics. The first verse is: "Today to get the public to attend the picture show/ It's not enough to advertise a famous star they know/ If you wanna get the crowds to come around/ You gotta have glorious Technicolor/ Breathtaking CinemaScope and stereophonic sound." The musical was adapted for film in 1957 and was indeed filmed in CinemaScope. (Although the song refers to Technicolor, the film was actually made in Metrocolor.)

While the lens system has been retired for decades, Fox has used the trademark in recent years for a few films: Down with Love, which was shot with Panavision optics but used the credit as a throwback to the films it references, the Don Bluth films Anastasia and Titan A.E. at Bluth's insistence. However these films are not in true CinemaScope because they use modern lenses. CinemaScope's association with anamorphic projection is still so embedded in mass consciousness that all anamorphic prints are now referred to generically as 'Scope prints.

Similarly, the 2016 release La La Land was shot on film (not digitally) with Panavision equipment in a 2.55:1 widescreen format, but not true CinemaScope. However, the film's opening credits do say "Presented in CinemaScope" ("presented", not "shot") as a tribute to 1950s musicals in that format. This credit appears initially in black-and-white and in a narrow format. It then widens to widescreen and dissolves to the old-fashioned CinemaScope logo, in color.

In the 1963 Jean-Luc Godard film Contempt (Le Mepris), filmmaker Fritz Lang makes a disparaging comment about CinemaScope: "Oh, it wasn't meant for human beings. Just for snakes – and funerals." Ironically, Contempt was shot in Franscope, a process with a similar format to CinemaScope.

During the production of 1999's The Iron Giant, director Brad Bird wanted to advertise the film with the CinemaScope name and logo, but Fox would not allow its use. A reference to CinemaScope was included during the end credits of the 2015 "Signature Edition" re-release.

In the 1988 film Hairspray and the 2007 remake, there are references to CinemaScope. In both instances, they are comments made in regard to Tracy Turnblad's weight, implying that she's too big to be seen on a television screen. In the 1988 version, a comment was said in dialogue by one of the current "coolest kids in town" during Tracy's audition. In the remake of 2007, also during Tracy's audition, it was a lyric sung by Amber von Tussle, singing, "This show isn't broadcast in CinemaScope!" in the song "(The Legend of) Miss Baltimore Crabs".

The technology is also mentioned in the first lyrical stanza of the song "Hot Knife" by Fiona Apple from her album The Idler Wheel..., which reads: "If I'm butter, If I'm butter/ If I'm butter then he's a hot knife/ He makes my heart a CinemaScope screen/ showing the dancing bird of paradise."

== See also ==
- 21:9 aspect ratio
- List of motion picture film formats
- VistaVision
