= Aaton Penelope =

35mm motion picture camera

Aaton Penelope is a 35mm motion picture camera introduced by Aaton in October 2008. It is the first camera in the world designed as a switchable Techniscope or 3-perf shooting solution (2 perf-native and 3 perf user-switchable), and also the first 35mm camera to offer a progressive scan video-tap. It accepts a digital magazine and provides 4K digital output for true HD filming.

The Aaton Penelope was used by Scott Duncan to shoot the TV show Celebrity Apprentice, and cinematographer Hoyte van Hoytema used it in a 2-perf configuration for principal photography on The Fighter.

== Camera technical specifications ==
- Universal camera-body for 35mm 2-Perf.
- 2-Perf-native camera, swappable to 3-Perf and back in approx. 30 minutes with the 3-Perf kit.
- 22 dB noise level (±1 dB) in 2-Perf.
- 23 dB noise level (±1 dB) in 3-Perf.
- Weight: 8 kg with loaded 400' mag and 1 battery.
- 3–40 frame/s, Synch & Variable speeds (0.001 increments)
- Instant film-magazines, nine-minute autonomy at 24 frame/s in 35mm 2-Perf.
- Ready for instant 'Digital-Mag' silicon sensor equipped.
- Built to withstand extreme climates. (−10 °C to +40 °C)
- Extremely bright optical viewfinder with generous peripheral coverage
- Twin battery power supply: one for lightweight handheld shots; add the other for multi-accessory use.
- Ready to print PDF 'Image Report' with JPEG snapshots, metadata and AatonCode via USB key.

== Magazine ==
Open magazine.

- Instant 400' preloaded magazine.
- 2/3 Perf.
- Magnetic drive.
- Semi automatic film loading
- Easy loop length adjustment in daylight.
- Delivered with nose protector.

== Video-assist (Pal or NTSC) ==
Heater connector.

- Double resolution progressive scan SD video-assist.
- Flicker free at all operating speeds
- Internal Fameline generator – Multiple frame option
- Auto White Balance
- Adjustable RGB values – Color bar generator – Frame store
- Timecode in windows and VITC
- Mechanical Iris and video gain control
