= Freeze frame =

Freeze frame may refer to:

== Film and television ==
- Freeze-frame shot, a cinematographic technique
- Freeze frame television, a technique making use of freeze frame shots
- Freeze Frame (The Price Is Right), a game on The Price Is Right
- Freeze Frame (1979 film), a 1979 animated short directed by Chuck Jones
- Freeze Frame (TV series), a British Saturday morning children's magazine show
- Freeze Frame (1992 film), a 1992 television film directed by William Bindley
- Freeze Frame (2004 film), a 2004 film directed by John Simpson
- Still frame, a single image ("frame") from a film or video

== Music ==
- Freeze Frame (band), an English new wave band
- Freeze Frame (Godley & Creme album), a 1979 album by Godley & Creme
- Freeze Frame (The J. Geils Band album), a 1981 album by The J. Geils Band
  - "Freeze Frame" (song), a 1982 song on the above album

== Other ==
- Freeze Frame, a mini-game in Mario Party 6
- Freeze Frame, a novel written by Peter May (writer) in the Enzo series

== See also ==
- Freezeflame Galaxy, a fictional galaxy from the video game Super Mario Galaxy
