= Film frame =

Still image frame of moving picture

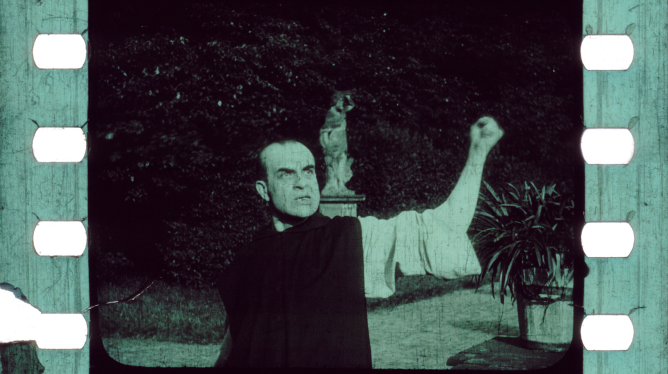
A single frame of 35 mm movie film stock

In filmmaking, video production, animation, and related fields, a frame is one of the many still images which compose the complete moving picture. The term is derived from the historical development of film stock, in which the sequentially recorded single images look like a framed picture when examined individually.

The term may also be used more generally as a noun or verb to refer to the edges of the image as seen in a camera viewfinder or projected on a screen. Thus, the camera operator can be said to keep a car in frame by panning with it as it speeds past.

== Overview ==
When the moving picture is displayed, each frame is flashed on a screen for a short time (nowadays typically 1/24, 1/25, or 1/30 of a second) and then immediately replaced by the next one. Persistence of vision blends the frames together, producing the illusion of a moving image.

The frame is also sometimes used as a unit of time, so that a momentary event might be said to last six frames, the actual duration of which depends on the frame rate of the system, which varies according to the video or film standard in use. In North America and Japan, 30 frames per second (fps) is the broadcast standard, with 24 fps now common in production for high-definition video shot to look like film. In much of the rest of the world, 25 fps is standard.

In systems historically based on NTSC standards, for reasons originally related to the Chromilog NTSC TV systems, the exact frame rate is actually 29.97 fps. This leads to many synchronization problems which are unknown outside the NTSC world, and also brings about hacks such as drop-frame timecode.

In film projection, 24 fps is the normal, except in some special venue systems, such as IMAX, Showscan and Iwerks 70, where 30, 48 or even 60 frame/s have been used. Silent films and 8 mm amateur movies used 16 or 18 frame/s.

== Physical film frames ==
In a strip of movie film, individual frames are separated by frame lines. Normally, 24 frames are needed for one second of film. In ordinary filming, the frames are photographed automatically, one after the other, in a movie camera. In special effects or animation filming, the frames are often shot one at a time.

The size of a film frame varies, depending on the still film format or the motion picture film format. In the smallest 8 mm amateur format for motion pictures film, it is only about 4.8 by 3.5 mm, while an IMAX frame is as large as 69.6 by 48.5 mm. The larger the frame size is in relation to the size of the projection screen, the sharper the image will appear.

The size of the film frame of motion picture film also depends on the location of the holes, the size of the holes, the shape of the holes. and the location and type of sound stripe.

The most common film format, 35 mm, has a frame size of 36 by 24 mm when used in a still 35 mm camera where the film moves horizontally, but the frame size varies when used for motion picture where the film moves vertically (with the exception of VistaVision and Technirama where the film moves horizontally). Using a 4-perf pulldown, there are exactly 16 frames in one foot of 35 mm film, leading to film frames sometimes being counted in terms of "feet and frames". The maximum frame size is 18 by 24 mm, (silent/full aperture), but this is significantly reduced by the application of sound track(s). A system called KeyKode is often used to identify specific physical film frames in a production.

== Video frames ==
Historically, video frames were represented as analog waveforms in which varying voltages represented the intensity of light in an analog raster scan across the screen. Analog blanking intervals separated video frames in the same way that frame lines did in film. For historical reasons, most systems used an interlaced scan system in which the frame typically consisted of two video fields sampled over two slightly different periods of time. This meant that a single video frame was usually not a good still picture of the scene, unless the scene being shot was completely still.

With the dominance of digital technology, modern video systems now represent the video frame as a rectangular raster of pixels, either in an RGB color space or a color space such as YCbCr, and the analog waveform is typically found nowhere other than in legacy I/O devices.

Standards for the digital video frame raster include Rec. 601 for standard-definition television and Rec. 709 for high-definition television.

Video frames are typically identified using SMPTE time code.

=== Line and resolution ===
The frame is composed of picture elements just like a chess board. Each horizontal set of picture elements is known as a line. The picture elements in a line are transmitted as sine signals where a pair of dots, one dark and one light can be represented by a single sine. The product of the number of lines and the number of maximum sine signals per line is known as the total resolution of the frame. The higher the resolution the more faithful the displayed image is to the original image. But higher resolution introduces technical problems and extra cost. So a compromise should be reached in system designs both for satisfactory image quality and affordable price.

=== Viewing distance ===
The key parameter to determine the lowest resolution still satisfactory to viewers is the viewing distance, i.e. the distance between the eyes and the monitor. The total resolution is inversely proportional to the square of the distance. If d is the distance, r is the required minimum resolution and k is the proportionality constant which depends on the size of the monitor, then:

$$r = k^2 \cdot  \frac{1}{d^2}$$

Since the number of lines is approximately proportional to the resolution per line, the above relation can also be written as

$$n = k \cdot  \frac{1}{d}$$

where n is the number of lines. That means that the required resolution is proportional to the height of the monitor and inversely proportional to the viewing distance.

=== Moving picture ===
In moving picture (TV) the number of frames scanned per second is known as the frame rate. The higher the frame rate, the better the sense of motion. But again, increasing the frame rate introduces technical difficulties. So the frame rate is fixed at 25 (System B/G) or 29.97 (System M). To increase the sense of motion it is customary to scan the very same frame in two consecutive phases. In each phase only half of the lines are scanned; only the lines with odd numbers in the first phase and only the lines with even numbers in the second phase. As each scan is known as a field, the field rate is thus twice the frame rate.

=== Example (System B) ===
In system B the number of lines is 625 and the frame rate is 25. The maximum video bandwidth is 5 MHz. The maximum number of sine signals the system is theorically capable of transmitting is given as follows:

The system is able to transmit 5 000 000 sine signals in a second. Since the frame rate is 25, the maximum number of sine signals per frame is 200 000. Dividing this number by the number of lines gives the maximum number of sine signals in a line which is 320. (Actually about 19% of each line is devoted to auxiliary services. So the number of maximum useful sine signals is about 260.)

== Still frame ==
A default still at the halfway point of a video of a Salt Flats Racing event, showing only a small dot in the distance

A selected better still of the same video, showing the vehicle before it has driven away

A still frame is a single static image taken from a film or video, which are kinetic (moving) images. Still frames are also called freeze frame, video prompt, preview or misleadingly thumbnail, keyframe, poster frame, or screen shot/grab/capture/dump. Freeze frames are widely used on video platforms and in video galleries, to show viewers a preview or a teaser. Many video platforms have a standard to display a frame from mid-time of the video. Some platforms offer the option to choose a different frame individually.

Video and film artists sometimes use still frames within the video/film to achieve special effects, like freeze-frame shots or still motion.

=== Investigations ===
For criminal investigations it has become a frequent use to publish still frames from surveillance videos in order to identify suspect persons and to find more witnesses. Video of the J.F. Kennedy assassination have been often discussed frame-by-frame for various interpretations. For medical diagnostics it is very useful to watch still frames of Magnetic resonance imaging videos.

== Fourth wall usage ==
Some humor in animation is based on the fourth wall aspect of the film frame itself, with some animation showing characters leaving what is assumed to be the edge of the film or the film malfunctioning. This latter one is used often in films as well. This hearkens back to some early cartoons, where characters were aware that they were in a cartoon, specifically that they could look at the credits and be aware of something that isn't part of the story as presented. These jokes include:

- Split frames – Where the fourth wall is broken by two frames, the lower half of the previous frame and the upper part of the next frame, showing at once, usually showing frame lines, with jokes involving them including a character crossing the frame itself.
- Film break – A famous form of the joke, where the film either snaps or is deliberately broken, with often the fourth wall coming into play during this period when, rightfully, there should be nothing on screen.
- Gate hair – A famous form of joke where the animator intentionally places fake "gate hairs" within the frame, which one of the animated characters plucks and removes from the frame.
- Editorial marks – Where those marks which an editor would normally employ on a "work print" to indicate the intended presence of a fade or a dissolve or a "wipe" to the SFX department are animated, and the film follows suit, or doesn't, depending upon the intended effect.
- Cue marks – Where those marks, usually circular for non-Technicolor titles and "serrated" for Technicolor titles to indicate a reel changeover are animated for a humorous effect. This could also be employed for the famous "false ending" effect, employed even today in popular songs. For Inglourious Basterds, the cue marks for the reel changes of the Nation's Pride pseudo-documentary employed exceptionally large scribed circles with a large "X" scribed within it—marks which would never be utilized in actual editorial practice (motor and changeover cue marks are supposed to be clearly visible to the projectionist, but not obvious to the audience).
- Exiting the frame – This joke, an extension of the split frames joke, has characters depart from the sides of the frame, sometimes finding themselves falling out of the cartoon entirely.

== See also ==
- Akinetopsia (motion blindness)
- Aspect ratio (image)
- Freeze frame (disambiguation)
- Freeze frame television
- Film grammar
- Frame rate
- Frame grabber
- Key frame
- List of film formats
- Shot (filmmaking)
- Slow motion
- Thumbshot
- Widescreen
