= A-Minima =

Super 16 movie camera

The A-Minima is a Super 16 movie camera that was introduced by Aaton in 1999. Touted as the smallest reflex viewfinder movie camera at the time, the camera is distinguished by its low-profile form-factor. It has a size comparable to a small prosumer video camera, and weights 4.4 pounds (2.0 kg) including film and battery. The A-Minima was the first Super 16 only camera.

In order to accommodate the camera design, Aaton worked with Eastman Kodak to create a specially designed flexible flange 200 feet (61 m) daylight spool. Because of the spool's particular design and the fact that the camera requires A-wind 16 mm film, the A-Minima can only use Kodak film stock, manufactured specifically for use with the A-Minima. The 200 foot length (approximately 5.5 minutes at 24 frame/s) and slightly noisy sound rating of 29 dB make it convenient as a B-camera or second unit camera; however, the small size and ease of use, along with an integrated AatonCode timecode unit, allow for less conspicuous and cumbersome shooting on Super 16. The camera is aimed at documentary filmmakers.
