= Aaton Digital =

French movie equipment manufacturer

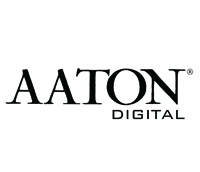
- Formerly: Aaton
- Type: Private
- Industry: Motion picture equipment
- Founded: 1971
- Defunct: 2024
- Headquarters: Grenoble, France
- Key people: Jean-Pierre Beauviala, Founder, Jacques Delacoux, CEO
- Products: Movie camera, Audio recorders, Audio and post production software
- Website: www.aaton.com

Aaton Digital (formerly known as Aaton) was a French motion picture equipment manufacturer, based in Grenoble, France.

== History ==
Aaton was founded by Eclair engineer Jean-Pierre Beauviala, whose efforts have been primarily focused on making quiet, portable motion picture hardware suitable for impromptu field use, such as for documentaries. A model for all motion picture cameras they have produced is the "cat-on-the-shoulder", a small, light, quiet motion picture camera.

In the late 60's Beauviala was working as a professor of electronics in the University of Grenoble. With the project to make a movie about the evolution of the city and of its architecture, but unable to find the proper tools, Beauviala decided to create the camera himself. Though the movie would eventually be abandoned this led to the creation of Aaton in 1971.

After several initial prototypes, the Aaton LTR 16 mm movie camera became available on the market in the late 1970s. It has been succeeded by several improved models, including the LTR, LTR 54, XTR, X0, XTRplus, and XTRProd.

Aaton also pioneered the linking of timecode between film cameras and sound recorders in the acquisition stage. Aatoncode was one of the earliest schemes for encoding a timecode signal in the frame margins of 16mm film, allowing rigorous synchronization of audio and film in post-production.

As of January 2015, the camera line offers the 16mm Xterà (along with its still used predecessors the XTR Prod), the A-Minima (a small camcorder-sized 16mm camera) and the 35mm Penelope (along with the still in use 35-III).

=== Airborn video devices niche products ===
In the late 90's, Aaton developed a line of specialized products dedicated to aviation. By using VBI lines (Vertical Blanking Interval), which are hidden lines of the video signal in analog scanning systems, Aaton created a dedicated encoding system.

By encoding information such as source identifier and timecode, a hardened video multiplexer was patented, allowing the simultaneous recording of multiples sources on a single analog recorder. This enables to save the space required for onboard video system during aircraft flight tests while allowing reliable synchronization of the different sources in ground video station.

This niche market eventually led to the creation in 2002 of a spin-off registered under the name AAVD (Aaton Airborn Video Devices), as Aaton did not wish to continue direct investment in this activity, which was mainly dedicated to military aircraft flight tests.

=== Evolution and digital products (2004–2012) ===
In 2004 Aaton introduced the Cantar-X, a multichannel digital audio recorder designed to be used on location.

In 2005/2006, the company started to test and exhibit the successor to the 35‑III, a quiet 35mm camera called Penelope. Specially designed with a native 2-perf camera system (with an optional kit to switch to 3-Perf), the Penelope eventually became available for purchase in October 2008.

During the 2010 NAB Show Jean-Pierre Beauviala and AbelCine officially announced Aaton's first digital camera, called Delta Penelope. A fully functional prototype was exhibited at the NAB Show two years later, with plans for a limited test run in 2012 and an eventual release in 2013. Evolving from a variation of the Penelope (with a digital mag) to a new concept, the camera most notably featured a "cat-on-the-shoulder" inspired design and a Dalsa Super-35 CCD sensor (with a native 3.5K resolution) mounted on a specially developed/patented mechanism designed to bring unprecedented image quality, closer to what film provides.

=== Recent developments and name change (2013-2023) ===
On 26 April 2013 an official statement was issued by founder Jean-Pierre Beauviala announcing that due to quality issues involving the Dalsa sensors for the planned Delta Penelope, the company had to declare bankruptcy so it could have time to find a new investor. In May 2013 Beauviala sent an e-mail detailing the situation of Aaton and explaining that despite the recent troubles the company was still functioning and mainly developing its next digital audio recorder (tentatively called Cantar-X+), and a digital-camera aiming at documentary-style filming (called D-Minima).

On 18 June 2013 Transvideo acquired Aaton through its holding company ITHAKI. Still based in Grenoble and with the same development team, the new company now named Aaton Digital was then focusing on the release of their new digital recorder (the Cantar-X3) and planning the release of a new "cat-on-the-shoulder" (sic).

On 22 October 2013 Jean-Pierre Beauviala left Aaton Digital/Transvideo where he was working as a consultant. This latest information engage only Jean-Pierre Beauviala as he never had any kind of formal cooperation with Aaton-Digital.

In March 2014 Aaton Digital officially introduced the Cantar-X3, the next successor in their line of on-field digital audio recorder. In March 2017 Aaton Digital launched the CantarMini and the same month won the "best of Show Award" at the "NAB show" in Las Vegas.

=== Bankruptcy and closure (2024) ===
On February 15, 2024 Aaton-Digital was ended by a court judgment. In a statement on their home webpage, the company indicated that recent years of slow business, caused by the COVID-19 pandemic and the 2023 cinema strike, had forced them to liquidate. "We thank all our users and partners for their commitment and passion during the ten years we have gone through together."

Aaton's assets were then sold in the bankruptcy auction to Atomos.

== Products ==
=== Camera models ===
==== 16 mm ====
- 7A (introduced in 1972)
- LTR (introduced in the late 1970s)
- LTR 54
- XTR
- X0
- XTR Plus
- XTR Prod
- Xterà
- A-Minima

==== 35 mm ====
- 35-I
- 35-II
- 35-III
- Penelope (introduced in October 2008)

==== Digital ====
- Delta Penelope (discontinued)

=== Sound recorders ===
- Cantar-X (introduced in 2004)
- Cantar-X2
- Cantar-X3 (introduced in March 2014)
- CantarMini (introduced in March 2017)
