= Still motion =

Method of displaying images rapidly

A still motion movie of computer mice.

Still motion is a method of displaying many images one after another as frames, using the technique of "frame-by-frame", similar to the concept of stop motion. The difference between this and stop motion, however, is that still motion is not a method of animation and therefore, each frame does not have to be related in any way. It is a style of editing which is usually used to create an intense effect.

== Overview ==
Still motion started as a method to intensify a scene. Mostly used in horror films, a sequence of images would appear on screen at a relatively fast speed to intensify the moment. It is also usually accompanied by unnerving music. It could also be used to signify flashbacks, dreams or summaries and lead to a conclusion of some sort. Sometimes, it could be slower and pictures fade in and out, like a slideshow.

The attributes of a still motion movie are less confined than that of a stop motion movie. A still motion movie can contain images of anything and need not have any composition relation with its predecessor frame. All frames should have the same dimensions, however, each image may have its own dimensions within a frame.

This method has been accused by many of subliminal messaging. Since the subconscious mind is said to pick things up much faster than the rest of the brain, one could say that a hidden message in a still motion movie, it may allow the brain to receive the message without the human eye having time to register it.

== History ==
The technique has been used in many forms of media. The most common form of still motion now exists as Adobe Flash or Gif animated banners on website advertisements.

== Examples ==
- In The Hitchhiker's Guide to the Galaxy, the infinite improbability drive of the Heart of Gold is represented by a still motion sequence of seemingly unrelated items accompanied by 'popping' sounds, finishing with the Heart of Gold.
- In Lost, Season 3, Episode 7, "Not in Portland", the character 'Karl' was brainwashed by a screen showing a still motion movie show various images and texts.
- In Chuck, Season 1, Episode 1, "Pilot", Charles Bartowski, sees a still motion movie containing U.S. intelligence files to become the intersect.
- In Heroes, Season 2, Episode 8, "Four Months Ago...", Peter Petrelli, sees a still motion movie when he retrieves his memory.
- In Vanilla Sky, David Aames sees a still motion movie of his life before he hits the ground
- The music video for the Death Grips song "I've Seen Footage" is a still motion sequence of various images.
- Ward Kimball's 1968 anti-war film Escalation makes significant use of the technique.

== See also ==
- Go motion
