= Frame line =

Unused space between two film frames

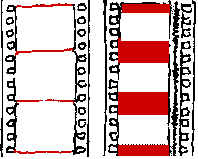
Frame lines shown in red on a "full-frame" negative, and on a "hard-matted" 1.85:1 projection print (with sound track), both on 35 mm film.

A frame line is the unused space that separates two adjacent images, or film frames, on the release print of a motion picture. They can vary in width; a 35 mm film with a 1.85:1 hard matte has a frame line approximately 8 mm (0.3 in) high, whereas both a full frame negative and the anamorphic format have very narrow frame lines, with the frames very close together. When a film is properly projected, the frame lines should not be visible to the audience and are typically cropped out in projection with a projector aperture, or a screen mask.

== See also ==
- Letterbox
