= Married print =

A married print is a film print which has had an optical soundtrack added onto the print. As the process usually is fairly expensive and resource-intensive, it usually is one of the last stages of post-production. Due to the intermittent motion of movie projectors and movie cameras, the sound cannot be located adjacent to the actual frames it is synced to, but instead must be offset by 21 frames (35mm). Because of this, a married print can not be edited, and thus should only be done when the picture and sound edits have been "locked", or finalized. Marrying a print is often done at the stage of the answer print, although this is not a requirement.
