= Negative pulldown =

Manner of exposing motion picture film that determines aspect ratio

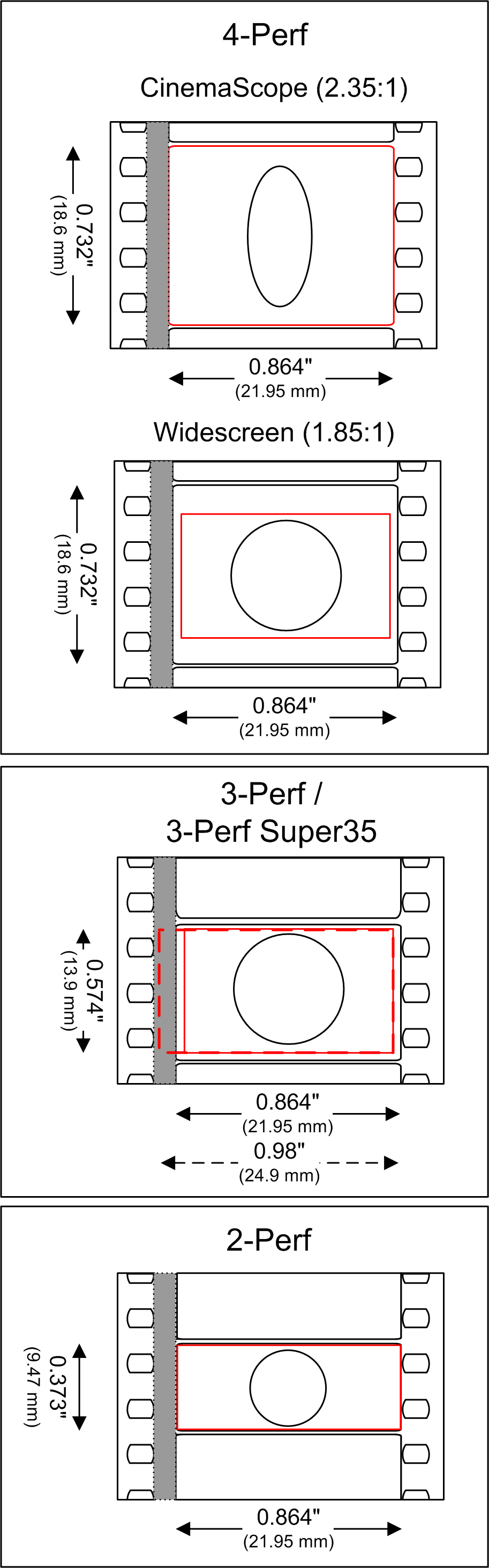
A comparison of 4-perf, 3-perf and 2-perf 35 mm film formats

Negative pulldown is the manner in which an image is exposed on a film stock, described by the number of film perforations spanned by an individual frame. It can also describe whether the image captured on the negative is oriented horizontally or vertically. Changing the number of exposed perforations allows a cinematographer to change both the aspect ratio of the image and the size of the area on the film stock that the image occupies (which affects image clarity).

The most common negative pulldowns for 35 mm film are 4-perf and 3-perf, the latter of which is usually used in conjunction with Super 35. 2-perf, used in Techniscope in the 1960s, is enjoying a slight resurgence due to the birth of digital intermediate techniques eliminating the need for optical lab work. Vertical pulldown is overwhelmingly the dominant axis of motion in cinematography, although horizontal pulldown is used in IMAX, VistaVision, and in 35 mm consumer and professional still cameras.

== Usage of various formats ==
=== History ===
The majority of 35 mm film systems, cameras, telecine equipment, optical printers, or projectors, are configured to accommodate the 4-perf system; each frame of 35 mm is 4 perforations long. 4-perf was (and remains) the traditional system, and the majority of projectors are based on 4-perf, because 4 perforations is the amount needed per frame vertically in order to have enough negative space for a roughly squarish image, which became the silent film standard aspect ratio of 1.33:1.

Later, when the film industry was facing the perceived threat of obsolescence to television, universally a 1.33:1 aspect ratio at the time (and remained so in many countries until the introduction of digital television), studios started experimenting with various competing widescreen formats.

== Current practice ==
Eventually, aspect ratios of 1.85:1 in North America and 1.66:1 in Europe became standard for 35 mm productions shot with normal non-anamorphic lenses. However, the aspect ratio for these films is not created within the camera itself but is achieved during projection by placing a cropping device, known as an aperture mask, over the film. As a result, most films are shot in full-screen format—commonly, though inaccurately, referred to as 1.33:1 but actually 1.37:1 due to the inclusion of soundtracks—while being composed for aspect ratios such as 1.85:1 or 1.66:1. These films are then cropped to the desired aspect ratio during projection. Consequently, a significant portion of the film is unused, as the cropped top and bottom sections are typically not intended to be displayed unless the film was specifically protected for full-screen presentation. The 3-perf and 2-perf systems are employed only during the origination and post-production transfer stages.

== 35 mm ==
=== 2-perf ===
2-perf camera systems use 2 perforations per frame on 35 mm film with an aspect ratio close to 2.39:1; the aspect ratio used in anamorphic prints. It was first proposed conceptually around 1930, but was not put into practice until 1961, when Techniscope was developed at Technicolor's Italian branch. It has recently been brought up again with the advent of higher quality, lower grain film stocks as well as digital intermediate post-production methods which eliminate optical blowups and thus improve quality. While in the recent past, some companies have offered custom conversions of camera equipment to 2-perf, it appears that camera manufacturers are now poised to support the format. Arri made 2-perf movement blocks for their Arricam and Arriflex 235 cameras available for rental in March 2007. Aaton's Penelope camera, released in October 2008, was the first camera specifically designed for 2-perf usage (as well as 3-perf).

=== 3-perf ===
In the early 1980s, Swedish cinematographer Rune Ericson collaborated with Panavision on the concept of creating a 3-perf mechanism for motion picture cameras. The 3-perf system, achieved by altering the camera gate and shutter mechanism, reduces film wastage by using frames that are 3 perforations high instead of the standard 4-perforations. This results in an aspect ratio of approximately 1.85:1, which closely aligns with the widescreen television aspect ratio of 1.78:1, thereby minimizing image loss outside this aspect ratio. Due to the smaller frame size, the camera operates about 25% slower, leading to a 25% reduction in film stock usage. Additionally, the camera operates more quietly because less film passes through the mechanism per frame. The Super 35 variant of 3-perf also provides a larger negative area, which can help offset the increase in grain when using higher-speed film stocks.

In the late 1990s, cinematographer Vittorio Storaro proposed a film standard known as Univisium (also called Univision), which advocated for 3-perf Super 35 to create a 2.00:1 aspect ratio.

=== Disadvantages of 3-perf and 2-perf ===
One disadvantage of 3-perf and 2-perf is found when projected theatrically, as it needs to be transferred back to a 4-perf system. This typically involves a film print with black cropping on the print itself in order to fit the image onto a 4-perf frame – encountering the same wastage problem as before. Even so, the amount of film shot on a production is much greater than the length of the final film, so 3-perf or 2-perf are still viable cost-saving options for production. Generally, 3-perf is most frequently used for widescreen television productions shot on film, as film is developed and then transferred to video, rendering projection incompatibilities irrelevant. Recently, this process has become popular with big-budget motion picture production, due to the advent of the digital intermediate process. The negative is scanned to high resolution (usually HD, 2K or 4K (digital cinema)) digital files, colour graded, and ultimately printed back to standard 4-perf for projection. At some point in the future, the final 4-perf print will become unnecessary assuming the cinema distribution and projection chain become fully digital.

3-perf and 2-perf pose minor problems for visual effects work. The area of the film in 4-perf work that is not projected nonetheless contains picture information which is useful for such visual effects tasks as 2D and 3D tracking. This mildly complicates certain visual effects efforts for productions using 3-perf and 2-perf.

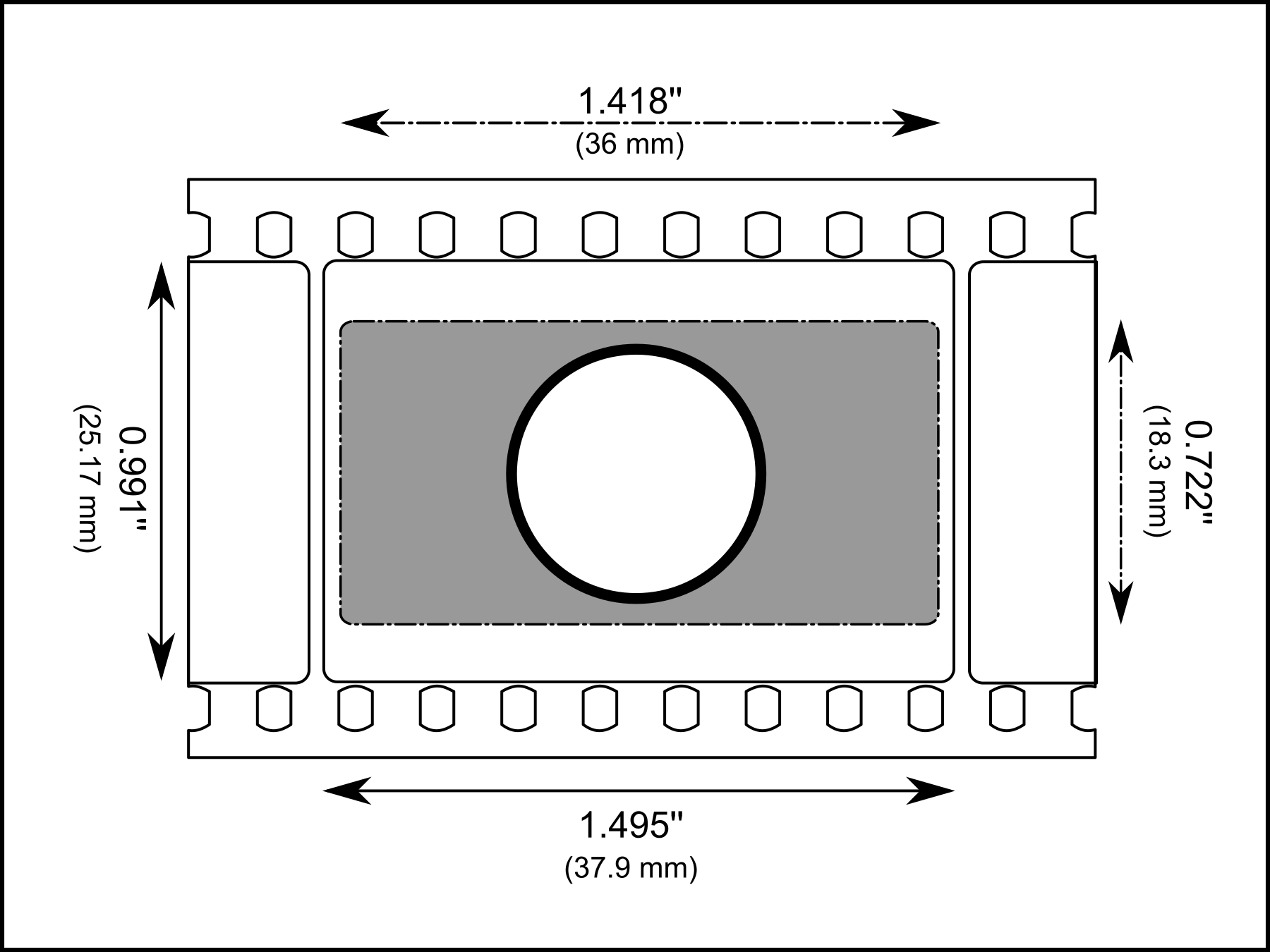
A VistaVision 35 mm frame, marked for a 1.85:1 crop

=== VistaVision ===
VistaVision is a higher resolution, widescreen variant of the 35 mm motion picture film format which was created by Paramount Pictures in 1954. It uses a horizontal, 8 perforation 35 mm image, similar to that used in 135 film for still photography. Paramount did not use anamorphic processes such as CinemaScope but refined the quality of their flat widescreen system by orienting the 35 mm negative horizontally in the camera gate and shooting onto a larger area, which yielded a finer-grained projection print.

== 70 mm ==
=== Standard 65 mm (5/70) (Todd-AO, Super Panavision) ===
- spherical lenses
- 5 perforations/frame
- 42 frames/meter (12.8 frame/ft)
- 34.29 meters/minute (112.5 ft/minute)
- vertical pulldown
- 24 frames/second
- camera aperture: 52.48 by 23.01 mm (2.066 by 0.906 in)
- projection aperture: 48.56 by 20.73 mm (1.912 by 0.816 in)
- 305 m (1000 feet), about 9 minutes at 24 frame/s = 4.5 kg (10 pounds) in can
- aspect ratio: 2.2:1

=== Ultra Panavision 70 (MGM Camera 65) ===
Same as Standard 65 mm except

- Shot with special anamorphic adapter in front of lens
- 1.25× squeeze factor, projected aspect ratio 2.76:1

=== Showscan ===
Same as Standard 65 mm except

- 60 frames per second

=== IMAX (15/70) ===
- spherical lenses
- 15 perforations per frame
- horizontal movement, from right to left (viewed from base side)
- 24 frames per second
- camera aperture: 70.41 by 52.63 mm (2.772 by 2.072 in)
- projection aperture: at least 2 mm (0.080 in) less than camera aperture on the vertical axis and at least 0.4 mm (0.016 in) less on the horizontal axis
- aspect ratio: 1.35:1 (camera), 1.43:1 (projected)

=== Dynavision (8/70) (Also known as Iwerks 8/70) ===
- fisheye or spherical lenses, depending on if projecting for a dome or not
- vertical pulldown
- 24 or 30 frames per second
- camera aperture: 52.83 by 37.59 mm (2.080 by 1.480 in)

== See also ==
- List of film formats
