= 35 mm movie film =

Standard theatrical motion picture film gauge

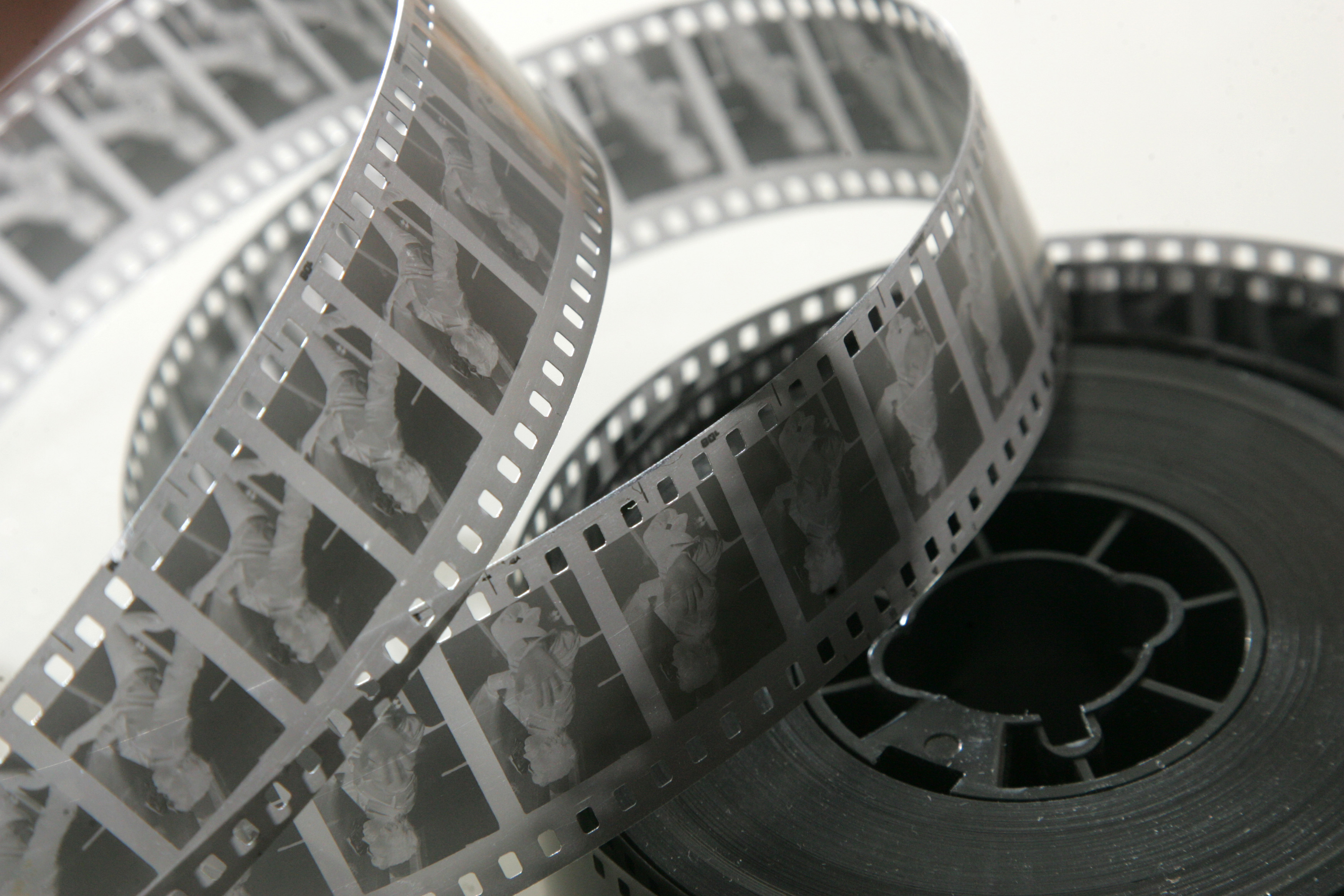
- Type: Film stock
- Inventor: William Kennedy Dickson
- Inception: 1889
- Manufacturer: Edison company; Eastman Kodak
- Current supplier: Kodak

35 mm film is a film gauge used in filmmaking. For motion pictures photographed on film, 35 mm is the most commonly used standard. The name of the gauge is not a direct measurement, and refers to the nominal width of the 35 mm format photographic film, which consists of strips 1.377 ± 0.001 inches (34.976 ± 0.025 mm) wide. The standard image exposure length on 35 mm for movies ("single-frame" format) is four perforations per frame along both edges, which results in 16 frames per foot of film.

A variety of largely proprietary gauges were devised for the numerous camera and projection systems being developed independently in the late 19th and early 20th centuries, along with various film feeding systems. This resulted in cameras, projectors, and other equipment having to be calibrated to each gauge. The 35 mm width, originally specified as 1 3/8 inches, was introduced around 1890 by William Kennedy Dickson and Thomas Edison, using film stock supplied by George Eastman. Film 35 mm wide with four perforations per frame became accepted as the international standard gauge in 1909, and remained by far the dominant film gauge for image origination and projection until the advent of digital photography and cinematography.

The gauge has been versatile in application. It has been modified to include sound, redesigned to create a safer film base, formulated to capture color, has accommodated a bevy of widescreen formats, and has incorporated digital sound data into nearly all of its non-frame areas. Eastman Kodak, Fujifilm and Agfa-Gevaert are some companies that offered 35 mm films. As of 2015, Kodak is the last remaining manufacturer of motion picture film.

The ubiquity of 35 mm movie projectors in commercial movie theaters made 35 mm the only motion picture format that could be played in almost any cinema in the world, until digital projection largely superseded it.

== History and development ==
=== Early history ===
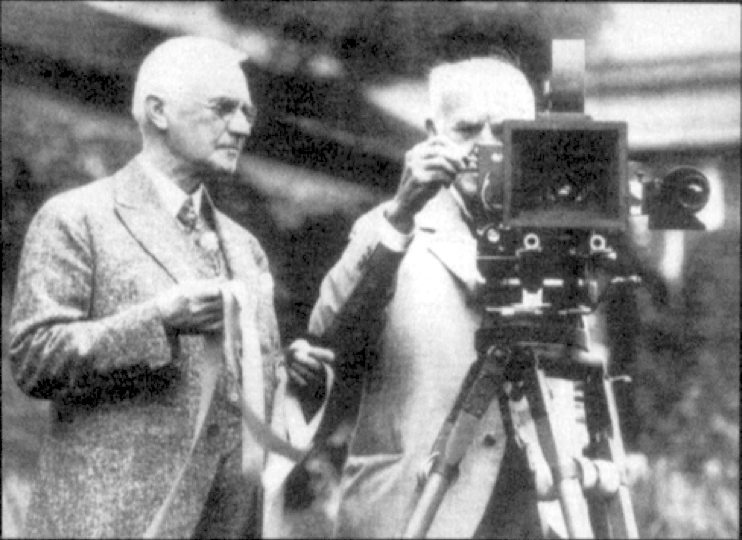
Eastman (L) giving Edison the first roll of movie film, which was 35 mm

In 1880, George Eastman began to manufacture gelatin dry photographic plates in Rochester, New York. Along with W. H. Walker, Eastman invented a holder for a roll of picture-carrying gelatin layer-coated paper. Hannibal Goodwin then invented a nitrocellulose film base in 1887, the first transparent, flexible film. Eastman also produced these components, and his was the first major company to mass-produce such film when, in 1889, Eastman realized that the dry-gelatino-bromide emulsion could be coated onto this clear base, eliminating the paper.

With the advent of flexible film, Thomas Edison quickly set out on his invention, the Kinetoscope, which was first shown at the Brooklyn Institute of Arts and Sciences on May 9, 1893. The Kinetoscope was a film loop system intended for one-person viewing. Edison, along with assistant William Kennedy Dickson, followed that up with the Kinetophone, which combined the Kinetoscope with Edison's cylinder phonograph. Beginning in March 1892, Eastman and then, from April 1893 into 1896, New York's Blair Camera Co. supplied Edison with film stock. Dickson is credited as the inventor of 35 mm movie film in 1889,^{652} when the Edison company was using Eastman film.^{653–654} (Note: The actual dimension of 35 mm specified by the SMPTE is 1.377 ± 0.001 inches (34.976 ± 0.025 mm). The size initially created by Dickson was only 0.075 mm narrower than the 35 mm standard that has existed since 1930. An account of this is given in an article by Dickson in the December 1933 SMPTE journal. This size was also exactly half the width of the 2 3/4-inch-wide (70 mm) "A-type" 120 and 620 rollfilm which was the standard Eastman size at the time. The standard size was increased at the May 1929 meeting of the SMPE and published in 1930.) The company still received film from Blair after this; at first Blair would supply only 40 mm (1 9/16 in) film stock that would be trimmed and perforated at the Edison lab to create 1 3/8-inch (35 mm) gauge filmstrips, then at some point in 1894 or 1895, Blair began sending stock to Edison that was cut exactly to specification. Edison's aperture defined a single frame of film at four perforations high.

Around 1896, a 35 mm projector known as a "photo-rotoscope" was made by W. C. Hughes in London, which advanced the film by means of a "dog" motion.

For a time, it had been generally assumed that Dickson was following cinematography formats established by Eastman in producing the film, but Eastman had produced film in sheets that were then cut to order.^{652–653} Dickson used the film supplied for Eastman Kodak cameras in 1889, a transparent 70 mm celluloid film, in his development of a more suitable film stock, and "simply slit this film in half";^{653–654} it was initially developed for the Kinetoscope, a one-person viewer, not to be projected.^{658} The image was still of high quality, even when magnified, and was more economical than 70 mm film (and more economical than any other gauge, as cutting the 70 mm to size would have created waste).^{654} 35 mm was immediately accepted as standard by the Lumière brothers, and became the main film used in the UK because it was the stock sold to these filmmakers by the Blair company.^{653}

Edison claimed exclusive patent rights to the design of 35 mm motion picture film, (Note: U.S. patent 0,589,168) with four sprocket holes (perforations) per frame, forcing his only major filmmaking competitor, American Mutoscope & Biograph, to use a 68 mm film that used friction feed, not sprocket holes, to move the film through the camera. A court judgment in March 1902 invalidated Edison's claim, allowing any producer or distributor to use the Edison 35 mm film design without license. Filmmakers were already doing so in Britain and Europe, where Edison did not file patents. At the time, film stock was usually supplied unperforated and punched by the filmmaker to their standards with perforation equipment. A variation developed by the Lumière brothers used a single circular perforation on each side of the frame towards the middle of the horizontal axis.

==== Becoming the standard ====
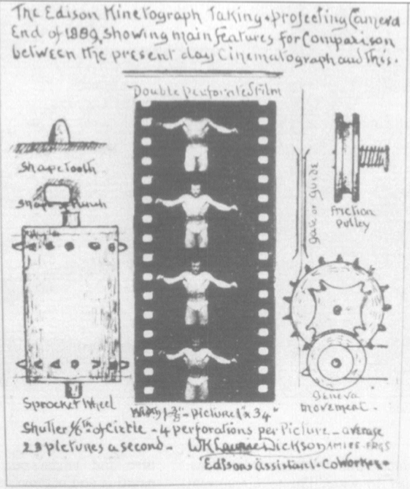
Dickson's 35 mm movie film standard (center)

When films began to be projected, several projection devices were unsuccessful and fell into obscurity because of technical failure, lack of business acumen on the part of their promoters, or both. The Vitascope, the first projection device to use 35 mm, was technologically superior and compatible with the many motion pictures produced on 35 mm film. Edison bought the device in 1895–96; the Lumiere's 35 mm projection Cinematograph also premiered in 1895, and they established 35 mm as the standard for exhibition.^{658}

Standardization in recording came from monopolization of the business by Eastman and Edison, and because of Edison's typical business model involving the patent system: Eastman and Edison managed their film patents well^{656} – Edison filed the 35 mm patent in 1896, the year after Dickson left his employ^{657} – and so controlled the use and development of film.^{656} Dickson left the Edison company in 1895, going on to help competitors produce cameras and other film gauges that would not infringe on Edison's patents. However, by 1900, filmmakers found it too expensive to develop and use other gauges, and went back to using the cheap and widely-available 35 mm.^{657}

Dickson said in 1933:

At the end of the year 1889, I increased the width of the picture from 1/2 inch to 3/4 inch, then, to 1 inch by 3/4 inch high. The actual width of the film was 1 3/8 inches to allow for the perforations now punched on both edges, 4 holes to the phase or picture, which perforations were a shade smaller than those now in use. This standardized film size of 1889 has remained, with only minor variations, unaltered to date.^{652}

Until 1953, the 35 mm film was seen as "basic technology" in the film industry, rather than optional, despite other gauges being available.^{652}

35 mm film diagram

In 1908, Edison formed "a cartel of production companies", a trust called the Motion Picture Patents Company (MPPC), pooling patents for collective use in the industry and positioning Edison's own technology as the standard to be licensed out.^{656} 35 mm became the "official" standard of the newly formed MPPC, which agreed in 1909 to what would become the standard: 35 mm gauge, with Edison perforations and a 1.33̅:1 (4:3) aspect ratio (also developed by Dickson).^{652} (Note: The gauge and perforations are almost identical to modern film stock; the full silent ratio is also used as the film gate in movie cameras, although portions of the image are later cropped out in post-production and projection.) Scholar Paul C. Spehr describes the importance of these developments:

The early acceptance of 35 mm as a standard had momentous impact on the development and spread of cinema. The standard gauge made it possible for films to be shown in every country of the world ... It provided a uniform, reliable and predictable format for production, distribution and exhibition of movies, facilitating the rapid spread and acceptance of the movies as a world-wide device for entertainment and communication.

When the MPPC adopted the 35 mm format, Bell & Howell produced cameras, projectors, and perforators for the medium of an "exceptionally high quality", further cementing it as the standard.^{659} Edison and Eastman's form of business manipulation was ruled unlawful in 1914, but by this time the technology had become the established standard.^{657} In 1917, the new Society of Motion Picture Engineers (SMPE) "acknowledged the de facto status of 35 mm as the industry's dominant film gauge, adopting it as an engineering standard".^{659}

=== Innovations in sound ===
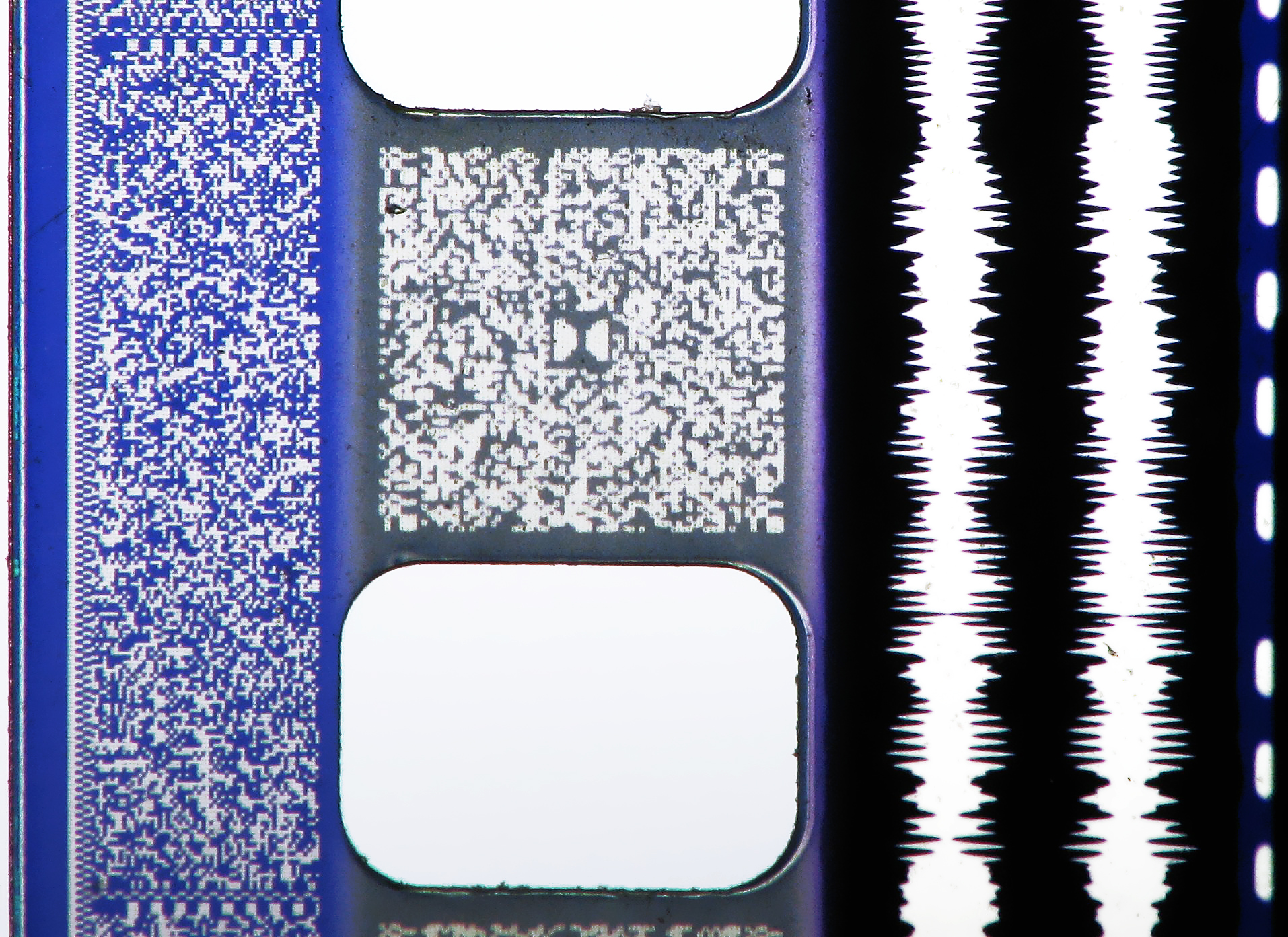
A photo of a 35 mm film print featuring all four audio formats (or "quad track") — from left to right: SDDS, a soundtrack as an image of a digital signal (blue area to the left of the sprocket holes); Dolby Digital sound (grey area between the sprocket holes labelled with the Dolby "Double-D" logo in the middle); analog optical sound, optically recorded as waveforms containing the audio signals for the left and right audio channels (the two white lines to the right of the sprocket holes); and the DTS time code (the dashed line to the far right).

When film editing was done by physically cutting the film, editing the picture could only have been done on the frame line. However, the sound was stored for the whole frame between each of the four sprocket holes, and so the sound editors could cut on any arbitrary set of holes, and thus get 1/4-frame edit resolution. With this technique, an audio edit could be accurate to within 10.41 ms."^{1–2} A limitation of analog optical recording was the audio frequency would cut off, in a well-maintained theater, at around 12kHz.^{4} Studios would often record audio on the transparent film strips, but with magnetic tape on one edge; recording audio on full 35 mm magnetic tape was more expensive.^{5}

Three different digital soundtrack systems for 35 mm cinema release prints were introduced during the 1990s. They are: Dolby Digital, which is stored between the perforations on the sound side; SDDS, stored in two redundant strips along the outside edges (beyond the perforations); and DTS, in which sound data is stored on separate compact discs synchronized by a timecode track on the film just to the right of the analog soundtrack and left of the frame. Because these soundtrack systems appear on different parts of the film, one movie can contain all of them, allowing broad distribution without regard for the sound system installed at individual theatres.

The analogue optical track technology has also changed: in the early years of the 21st century, distributors changed to using cyan dye optical soundtracks instead of applicated tracks, which use environmentally unfriendly chemicals to retain a silver (black-and-white) soundtrack. Because traditional incandescent exciter lamps produce copious amounts of infrared light, and cyan tracks do not absorb infrared light, this change has required theaters to replace the incandescent exciter lamp with a complementary colored red LED or laser. These LED or laser exciters are backwards-compatible with older tracks. The film Anything Else (2003) was the first to be released with only cyan tracks.

To facilitate this changeover, intermediate prints known as "high magenta" prints were distributed. These prints used a silver plus dye soundtrack that were printed into the magenta dye layer. The advantage gained was an optical soundtrack, with low levels of sibilant (cross-modulation) distortion, on both types of sound heads.

=== Modern 3D systems ===
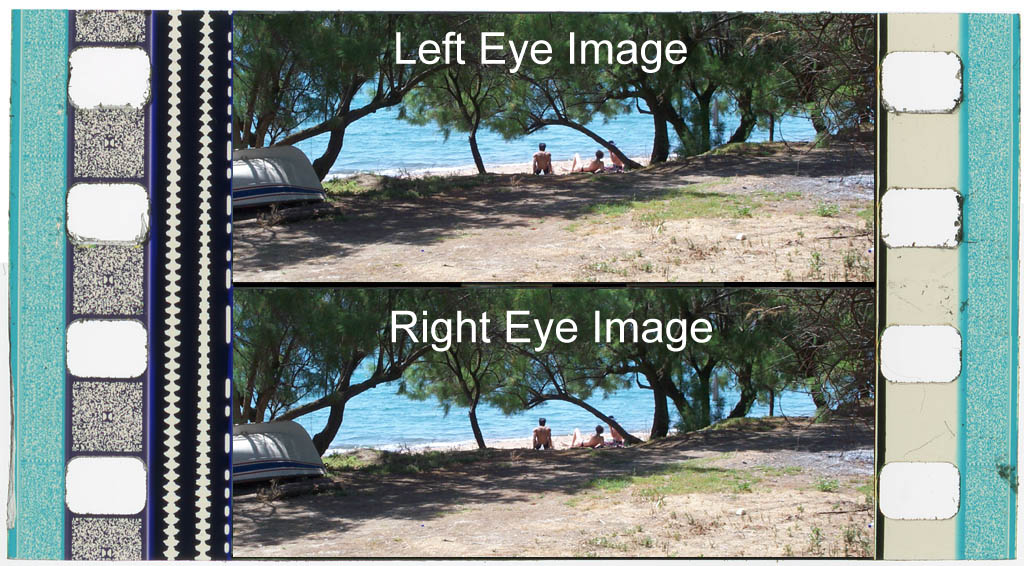
An "over-under" 3D frame. Both left and right eye images are contained within the normal height of a single 2D frame.

The success of digitally projected 3D movies in the first two decades of the 21st century led to a demand from some theater owners to be able to show these movies in 3D without incurring the high capital cost of installing digital projection equipment. To satisfy that demand, a number of systems had been proposed for 3D systems based on 35 mm film by Technicolor, Panavision and others. These systems are improved versions of the "over-under" stereo 3D prints first introduced in the 1960s.

To be attractive to exhibitors, these schemes offered 3D films that can be projected by a standard 35 mm cinema projector with minimal modification, and so they are based on the use of "over-under" film prints. In these prints a left-right pair of 2.39:1 non-anamorphic images are substituted for the one 2.39:1 anamorphic image of a 2D "scope" print. The frame dimensions are based on those of the Techniscope 2-perf camera format used in the 1960s and 1970s. However, when used for 3D the left and right frames are pulled down together, thus the standard 4-perf pulldown is retained, minimising the need for modifications to the projector or to long-play systems. The linear speed of film through the projector and sound playback both remain exactly the same as in normal 2D operation.

The Technicolor system uses the polarisation of light to separate the left and right eye images and for this they rent to exhibitors a combination splitter-polarizer-lens assembly which can be fitted to a lens turret in the same manner as an anamorphic lens. In contrast, the Panavision system uses a spectral comb filter system, but their combination splitter-filter-lens is physically similar to the Technicolor assembly and can be used in the same way. No other modifications are required to the projector for either system, though for the Technicolor system a silver screen is necessary, as it would be with polarised-light digital 3D. Thus a programme can readily include both 2D and 3D segments with only the lens needing to be changed between them.

In June 2012, Panavision 3D systems for both 35 mm film and digital projection were withdrawn from the market by DVPO theatrical (who marketed these system on behalf of Panavision) citing "challenging global economic and 3D market conditions".

=== Decline and resurgence ===
In the transition period centered around 2010–2015, the rapid conversion of the cinema exhibition industry to digital projection saw 35 mm film projectors removed from most of the projection rooms as they were replaced by digital projectors. By the mid-2010s, most of the theaters across the world had been converted to digital projection, although a small percentage (under 10% overall) continued running 35 mm projectors, mostly indie theaters or those in more economically challenged regions. However, it continued as a niche market for enthusiasts and format lovers.

In the 2020s, 35 mm has seen some resurgence in usage. The resurgence comes from those who find 35 mm to be more visually pleasing and evoke nostalgic feelings, as well as a desire from millennial and Generation Z filmmakers and photographers to preserve the art. Several films such as Marty Supreme and Anora have been produced using 35 mm film. In an effort to rebuild business lost during the COVID-19 pandemic, some theaters have used special event screenings of films with 35 mm film projectors to attract customers. Most of these screenings occur in large metropolitan areas.

== Attributes ==
=== Color ===
Originally, film was a strip of cellulose nitrate coated with black-and-white photographic emulsion. Early film pioneers, like D. W. Griffith, color tinted or toned portions of their movies for dramatic impact, and by 1920, 80 to 90 percent of all films were tinted. The first successful natural color process was Britain's Kinemacolor (1909–1915), a two-color additive process that used a rotating disk with red and green filters in front of the camera lens and the projector lens. But any process that photographed and projected the colors sequentially was subject to color "fringing" around moving objects, and a general color flickering.

In 1916, William Van Doren Kelley began developing Prizma, the first commercially viable American color process using 35 mm film. Initially, like Kinemacolor, it photographed the color elements one after the other and projected the results by additive synthesis. Ultimately, Prizma was refined to bipack photography, with two strips of film, one treated to be sensitive to red and the other not, running through the camera face to face. Each negative was printed on one surface of the same duplitized print stock and each resulting series of black-and-white images was chemically toned to transform the silver into a monochrome color, either orange-red or blue-green, resulting in a two-sided, two-colored print that could be shown with any ordinary projector. This system of two-color bipack photography and two-sided prints was the basis for many later color processes, such as Multicolor, Brewster Color and Cinecolor.

Although it had been available previously, color in Hollywood feature films first became truly practical from the studios' commercial perspective with the advent of Technicolor, whose main advantage was quality prints in less time than its competitors. In its earliest incarnations, Technicolor was another two-color system that could reproduce a range of reds, muted bluish greens, pinks, browns, tans and grays, but not real blues or yellows. The Toll of the Sea, released in 1922, was the first film printed in their subtractive color system. Technicolor's camera photographed each pair of color-filtered frames simultaneously on one strip of black-and-white film by means of a beam splitter prism behind the camera lens. Two prints on half-thickness stock were made from the negative, one from only the red-filtered frames, the other from the green-filtered frames. After development, the silver images on the prints were chemically toned to convert them into images of the approximately complementary colors. The two strips were then cemented together back to back, forming a single strip similar to duplitized film.

In 1928, Technicolor started making their prints by the imbibition process, which was mechanical rather than photographic and allowed the color components to be combined on the same side of the film. Using two matrix films bearing hardened gelatin relief images, thicker where the image was darker, aniline color dyes were transferred into the gelatin coating on a third, blank strip of film.

Technicolor re-emerged as a three-color process for cartoons in 1932 and live action in 1934. Using a different arrangement of a beam-splitter cube and color filters behind the lens, the camera simultaneously exposed three individual strips of black-and-white film, each one recording one-third of the spectrum, which allowed virtually the entire spectrum of colors to be reproduced. A printing matrix with a hardened gelatin relief image was made from each negative, and the three matrices transferred color dyes into a blank film to create the print.

Two-color processes, however, were far from extinct. In 1934, William T. Crispinel and Alan M. Gundelfinger revived the Multicolor process under the company name Cinecolor. Cinecolor saw considerable use in animation and low-budget pictures, mainly because it cost much less than three-color Technicolor. If color design was carefully managed, the lack of colors such as true green could pass unnoticed. Although Cinecolor used the same duplitized stock as Prizma and Multicolor, it had the advantage that its printing and processing methods yielded larger quantities of finished film in less time.

In 1950, Kodak announced the first Eastman color 35 mm negative film (along with a complementary positive film) that could record all three primary colors on the same strip of film. An improved version in 1952 was quickly adopted by Hollywood, making the use of three-strip Technicolor cameras and bipack cameras (used in two-color systems such as Cinecolor) obsolete in color cinematography. This "monopack" structure is made up of three separate emulsion layers, one sensitive to red light, one to green and one to blue.

=== Safety film ===
Although Eastman Kodak had first introduced acetate-based film, it was far too brittle and prone to shrinkage, so the dangerously flammable nitrate-based cellulose films were generally used for motion picture camera and print films. In 1949 Kodak began replacing all nitrocellulose (nitrate-based) films with the safer, more robust cellulose triacetate-based "Safety" films. In 1950 the Academy of Motion Picture Arts and Sciences awarded Kodak with a Scientific and Technical Academy Award (Oscar) for the safer triacetate stock. By 1952, all camera and projector films were triacetate-based. Most if not all film prints today are made from synthetic polyester safety base (which started replacing Triacetate film for prints in the early 1990s). The downside of polyester film is that it is extremely strong, and, in case of a fault, will stretch and not break–potentially causing damage to the projector and ruining a fairly large stretch of film: 2–3 ft or approximately 2 seconds. Also, polyester film will melt if exposed to the projector lamp for too long. Original camera negative is still made on a triacetate base, and some intermediate films (certainly including internegatives or "dupe" negatives, but not necessarily including interpositives or "master" positives) are also made on a triacetate base as such films must be spliced during the "negative assembly" process, and the extant negative assembly process is solvent-based. Polyester films are not compatible with solvent-based assembly processes.

=== Other types ===
Besides black & white and color negative films, there are black & white and color reversal films, which when developed create a positive ("natural") image that is projectable. There are also films sensitive to non-visible wavelengths of light, such as infrared.

== Common formats ==
=== Academy format ===
Academy Ratio (4-perf) format diagram

In the conventional motion picture format, frames are four perforations tall, with an aspect ratio of 1.375:1, 22 by 16 mm (0.866 by 0.630 in). This is a derivation of the aspect ratio and frame size designated by Thomas Edison (24.89 by 18.67 millimetres or 0.980 by 0.735 inches) at the dawn of motion pictures, which was an aspect ratio of 1.33:1. The first sound features were released in 1926–27, and while Warner Bros. was using synchronized phonograph discs (sound-on-disc), Fox placed the soundtrack in an optical record directly on the film (sound-on-film) on a strip between the sprocket holes and the image frame. "Sound-on-film" was soon adopted by the other Hollywood studios, resulting in an almost square image ratio of 0.860 in by 0.820 in.

By 1929, most movie studios had revamped this format using their own house aperture plate size to try to recreate the older screen ratio of 1.33:1. Furthermore, every theater chain had their own house aperture plate size in which the picture was projected. These sizes often did not match up even between theaters and studios owned by the same company, and therefore, uneven projection practices occurred.

In November 1929, the Society of Motion Picture Engineers set a standard aperture ratio of 0.800 in by 0.600 in. Known as the "1930 standard", studios which followed the suggested practice of marking their camera viewfinders for this ratio were: Paramount-Famous-Lasky, Metro-Goldwyn Mayer, United Artists, Pathe, Universal, RKO, Tiffany-Stahl, Mack Sennett, Darmour, and Educational. The Fox Studio markings were the same width but allowed .04 in more height.

In 1932, in refining this ratio, the Academy of Motion Picture Arts and Sciences expanded upon this 1930 standard. The camera aperture became 22 by 16 mm (0.87 by 0.63 in), and the projected image would use an aperture plate size of 0.825 by 0.600 in (21.0 by 15.2 mm), yielding an aspect ratio of 1.375:1. This became known as the "Academy" ratio. Since the 1950s the aspect ratio of some theatrically released motion picture films has been 1.85:1 (1.66:1 in Europe) or 2.35:1 (2.40:1 after 1970). The image area for "TV transmission" is slightly smaller than the full "Academy" ratio at 21 by 16 mm (0.83 by 0.63 in), an aspect ratio of 1.33:1. Hence when the "Academy" ratio is referred to as having an aspect ratio of 1.33:1, it is done so mistakenly.

=== Widescreen ===
CinemaScope (2.39:1, flat and anamorphic) format diagram

The commonly used anamorphic format uses a similar four-perf frame, but an anamorphic lens is used on the camera and projector to produce a wider image, today with an aspect ratio of about 2.39:1 (more commonly referred to as 2.40:1). The ratio was formerly 2.35:1—and is still often mistakenly referred to as such—until an SMPTE revision of projection standards in 1970. The image, as recorded on the negative and print, is horizontally compressed (squeezed) by a factor of 2.

The unexpected success of the Cinerama widescreen process in 1952 led to a boom in film format innovations to compete with the growing audiences of television and the dwindling audiences in movie theaters. These processes could give theatergoers an experience that television could not at that time—color, stereophonic sound and panoramic vision. Before the end of the year, 20th Century Fox had narrowly "won" a race to obtain an anamorphic optical system invented by Henri Chrétien, and soon began promoting the Cinemascope technology as early as the production phase.

Widescreen (1.85:1, flat and anamorphic) format diagram

Looking for a similar alternative, other major studios hit upon a simpler, less expensive solution by April 1953: the camera and projector used conventional spherical lenses (rather than much more expensive anamorphic lenses), but by using a removable aperture plate in the film projector gate, the top and bottom of the frame could be cropped to create a wider aspect ratio. Paramount Pictures began this trend with their aspect ratio of 1.66:1, first used in Shane, which was originally shot for Academy ratio. It was Universal Studios, however, with their May release of Thunder Bay that introduced the now standard 1.85:1 format to American audiences and brought attention to the industry the capability and low cost of equipping theaters for this transition.

Other studios followed suit with aspect ratios of 1.75:1 up to 2:1. For a time, these various ratios were used by different studios in different productions, but by 1956, the aspect ratio of 1.85:1 became the "standard" US format. These flat films are photographed with the full Academy frame, but are matted (most often with a mask in the theater projector, not in the camera) to obtain the "wide" aspect ratio. The standard, in some European countries, became 1.66:1 instead of 1.85:1, although some productions with pre-determined American distributors composed for the latter to appeal to US markets.

In September 1953, 20th Century Fox debuted CinemaScope with their production of The Robe to great success. CinemaScope became the first marketable usage of an anamorphic widescreen process and became the basis for a host of "formats", usually suffixed with -scope, that were otherwise identical in specification, although sometimes inferior in optical quality. (Some developments, such as SuperScope and Techniscope, however, were truly entirely different formats.) By the early 1960s, however, Panavision would eventually solve many of the CinemaScope lenses' technical limitations with their own lenses, and by 1967, CinemaScope was replaced by Panavision and other third-party manufacturers.

The 1950s and 1960s saw many other novel processes using 35 mm, such as VistaVision, SuperScope, and Technirama, most of which ultimately became obsolete. VistaVision, however, would be revived decades later by Lucasfilm and other studios for special effects work, while a SuperScope variant became the predecessor to the modern Super 35 format that is popular today.

=== Super 35 ===
Super 35 format diagram

The concept behind Super 35 originated with the Tushinsky Brothers' SuperScope format, particularly the SuperScope 235 specification from 1956. In 1982, Joe Dunton revived the format for Dance Craze, and Technicolor soon marketed it under the name "Super Techniscope" before the industry settled on the name Super 35. The central driving idea behind the process is to return to shooting in the original silent "Edison" 1.33:1 full 4-perf negative area (24.89 by 18.67 millimetres or 0.980 by 0.735 inches), and then crop the frame either from the bottom or the center (like 1.85:1) to create a 2.40:1 aspect ratio (matching that of anamorphic lenses) with an area of 24 by 10 mm (0.94 by 0.39 in). Although this cropping may seem extreme, by expanding the negative area out perf-to-perf, Super 35 creates a 2.40:1 aspect ratio with an overall negative area of 240 square millimetres (0.37 sq in), only 9 square millimetres (0.014 sq in) less than the 1.85:1 crop of the Academy frame (248.81 square millimetres or 0.38566 square inches). The cropped frame is then converted at the intermediate stage to a 4-perf anamorphically squeezed print compatible with the anamorphic projection standard. This allows an "anamorphic" frame to be captured with non-anamorphic lenses, which are much more common.

Until the year 2000, once the film was photographed in Super 35, an optical printer was used to anamorphose (squeeze) the image. This optical step reduced the overall quality of the image and made Super 35 a controversial subject among cinematographers, many who preferred the higher image quality and frame negative area of anamorphic photography (especially with regard to granularity). With the advent of digital intermediates (DI) at the beginning of the 21st century, however, Super 35 photography has become even more popular, since everything could be done digitally, scanning the original 4-perf 1.33:1 (or 3-perf 1.78:1) picture and cropping it to the 2.39:1 frame already in-computer, without anamorphosing stages, and also without creating an additional optical generation with increased grain. This process of creating the aspect ratio in the computer allows the studios to perform all post-production and editing of the movie in its original aspect (1.33:1 or 1.78:1) and to then release the cropped version, while still having the original when necessary (for Pan & Scan, HDTV transmission, etc.).

=== 3-perf ===
3-perf Super 35 format diagram

The non-anamorphic widescreen ratios (most commonly 1.85:1) used in modern feature films makes inefficient use of the available image area on 35 mm film using the standard 4-perf pulldown; the height of a 1.85:1 frame occupying only 65% of the distance between the frames. It is clear, therefore, that a change to a 3-perf pulldown would allow for a 25% reduction in film consumption whilst still accommodating the full 1.85:1 frame. Ever since the introduction of these widescreen formats in the 1950s various film directors and cinematographers have argued in favour of the industry making such a change. The Canadian cinematographer Miklos Lente invented and patented a three-perforation pull down system which he called "Trilent 35" in 1975 though he was unable to persuade the industry to adopt it.

The idea was later taken up by the Swedish film-maker Rune Ericson who was a strong advocate for the 3-perf system. Ericson shot his 51st feature Pirates of the Lake in 1986 using two Panaflex cameras modified to 3-perf pulldown and suggested that the industry could change over completely over the course of ten-years. However, the movie industry did not make the change mainly because it would have required the modification of the thousands of existing 35 mm projectors in movie theaters all over the world. Whilst it would have been possible to shoot in 3-perf and then convert to standard 4-perf for release prints the extra complications this would cause and the additional optical printing stage required made this an unattractive option at the time for most film makers.

However, in television production, where compatibility with an installed base of 35 mm film projectors is unnecessary, the 3-perf format is sometimes used, giving—if used with Super 35—the 16:9 ratio used by HDTV and reducing film usage by 25 percent. Because of 3-perf's incompatibility with standard 4-perf equipment, it can utilize the whole negative area between the perforations (Super 35) without worrying about compatibility with existing equipment; the Super 35 image area includes what would be the soundtrack area in a standard print. All 3-perf negatives require optical or digital conversion to standard 4-perf if a film print is desired, though 3-perf can easily be transferred to video with little to no difficulty by modern telecine or film scanners. With digital intermediate now a standard process for feature film post-production, 3-perf is becoming increasingly popular for feature film productions which would otherwise be averse to an optical conversion stage.

=== VistaVision ===
A diagram of the VistaVision format, affectionately dubbed "Lazy 8" because it is eight perforations long and runs horizontally (lying down)

The VistaVision motion picture format was created in 1954 by Paramount Pictures to create a finer-grained negative and print for flat widescreen films. Similar to still photography, the format uses a camera running 35 mm film horizontally instead of vertically through the camera, with frames that are eight perforations long, resulting in a wider aspect ratio of 1.5:1 and greater detail, as more of the negative area is used per frame. This format is unprojectable in standard theaters and requires an optical step to reduce the image into the standard 4-perf vertical 35 mm frame.

While the format was dormant by the early 1960s, the camera system was revived for visual effects by John Dykstra at Industrial Light and Magic, starting with Star Wars, as a way of reducing granularity in the optical printer by having increased original camera negative area at the point of image origination. Its usage has again declined since the dominance of computer-based visual effects, although it still sees limited utilization.

== Perforations ==
35 mm film perforation hole types.

=== BH perforations ===
Film perforations were originally round holes cut into the side of the film, but as these perforations were subject to wear and deformation, the shape was changed to what is now called the Bell & Howell (BH) perforation, which has straight top and bottom edges and outward curving sides. The BH perforation's dimensions are 0.110 inches (2.8 mm) from the middle of the side curve to opposite top corner by 0.073 inches (1.9 mm) in height. The BH1866 perforation, or BH perforation with a pitch of 0.1866 inches (4.74 mm), is the modern standard for negative and internegative films.

=== KS perforations ===
Because BH has sharp corners, the repeated use of the film through intermittent movement projectors creates strain that can easily tear the perforations. Furthermore, they tended to shrink as the print slowly decayed. Therefore, larger perforations with a rectangular base and rounded corners were introduced by Kodak in 1924 to improve steadiness, registration, durability, and longevity. Known as "Kodak Standard" (KS), they are 0.0780 inches (1.98 mm) high by 0.1100 inches (2.79 mm) wide. Their durability makes KS perfs the ideal choice for some (but not all) intermediate and all release prints, and original camera negatives which require special use, such as high-speed filming, but not for bluescreen, front projection, rear projection, or matte work as these specific applications demand the more accurate registration which is only possible with BH or DH perforations. The increased height also means that the image registration was considerably less accurate than BH perfs, which remains the standard for negatives. The KS1870 perforation, or KS perforation with a pitch of 0.1870 inches (4.75 mm), is the modern standard for release prints.

These two perforations have remained by far the most commonly used ones. BH perforations are also known as N (negative) and KS as P (positive). The Bell & Howell perf remains the standard for camera negative films because of its perforation dimensions in comparison to most printers, thus it can keep a steady image compared to other perforations.

=== DH perforations ===
The Dubray–Howell (DH) perforation was first proposed in 1932 to replace the two perfs with a single hybrid. The proposed standard was, like KS, rectangular with rounded corners and a width of 0.1100 inches (2.79 mm), and, like BH, was 0.073 inches (1.9 mm) tall. This gave it longer projection life but also improved registration. One of its primary applications was usage in Technicolor's dye imbibition printing (dye transfer). The DH perf never had broad uptake, and Kodak's introduction of monopack Eastmancolor film in the 1950s reduced the demand for dye transfer, although the DH perforation persists in special application intermediate films.

=== CS perforations ===
In 1953, the introduction of CinemaScope by Fox Studios required the creation of a different shape of perforation which was nearly square and smaller to provide space for four magnetic sound stripes for stereophonic and surround sound. These perforations are commonly referred to as CinemaScope (CS) or "Fox hole" perfs. Their dimensions are 0.0780 inches (1.98 mm) in width by 0.0730 inches (1.85 mm) in height. Due to the size difference, CS perfed film cannot be run through a projector with standard KS sprocket teeth, but KS prints can be run on sprockets with CS teeth. Shrunken film with KS prints that would normally be damaged in a projector with KS sprockets may sometimes be run far more gently through a projector with CS sprockets because of the smaller size of the teeth. Magnetic striped 35 mm film became obsolete in the 1980s after the advent of Dolby Stereo, as a result film with CS perfs is no longer manufactured.

During continuous contact printing, the raw stock and the negative are placed next to one another around the sprocket wheel of the printer. The negative, which is the closer of the two to the sprocket wheel (thus creating a slightly shorter path), must have a marginally shorter pitch between perforations (0.1866 in pitch); the raw stock has a long pitch (0.1870 in). While cellulose nitrate and cellulose diacetate stocks used to shrink during processing slightly enough to have this difference naturally occur, modern safety stocks do not shrink at the same rate, and therefore negative (and some intermediate) stocks are perforated at a pitch of 0.2% shorter than print stock.

== Technical specifications ==
Areas on an Academy-width 35 mm spherical film print: 1. Camera aperture; 2. Academy ratio, 1.375:1; 3. 1.85:1 Ratio; 4. 1.66̅:1 Ratio; 5. Television scanned area; 6. Television "action safe" area; 7. Television "title safe" area

Technical specifications for 35 mm film are standardized by SMPTE.

- 16 frames per foot (0.748 inches (19.0 mm) per frame (long pitch))
- 24 frames per second (fps); 90 feet (27 m) per minute. 1,000 feet (300 m) is about 11 minutes at 24 fps.
- vertical pulldown
- 4 perforations per frame (all projection and most origination except 3-perf). 1 perforation = 3/16 in or 0.1875 in. 1 frame = 3/4 in or 0.75 in.

35 mm spherical

- Aspect ratio: 1.375:1 on camera aperture; 1.85:1 and 1.66̅:1 are hard- or soft-matted over this
- Camera aperture: 0.866 by 0.630 in (22.0 by 16.0 mm)
- Projector aperture (full 1.375:1): 0.825 by 0.602 in (21.0 by 15.3 mm)
- Projector aperture (1.66̅:1): 0.825 by 0.497 in (21.0 by 12.6 mm)
- Projector aperture (1.85:1): 0.825 by 0.446 in (21.0 by 11.3 mm)
- TV station aperture: 0.816 by 0.612 in (20.7 by 15.5 mm)
- TV transmission: 0.792 by 0.594 in (20.1 by 15.1 mm)
- TV safe action: 0.713 by 0.535 in (18.1 by 13.6 mm); corner radii: 0.143 inches (3.6 mm)
- TV safe titles: 0.630 by 0.475 in (16.0 by 12.1 mm); corner radii: 0.125 inches (3.2 mm)

Super 35 mm film

- Aspect ratio: 1.33̅:1 on 4-perf camera aperture
- Camera aperture (4-perf): 0.980 by 0.735 in (24.9 by 18.7 mm)
- Picture used (35 mm anamorphic): 0.945 by 0.394 inches (24.0 by 10.0 mm)
- Picture used (70 mm blowup): 0.945 by 0.430 inches (24.0 by 10.9 mm)
- Picture used (35 mm flat 1.85): 0.945 by 0.511 inches (24.0 by 13.0 mm)

35 mm anamorphic

- Aspect ratio: 2.39:1, in a 1.19:1 frame with a 2x horizontal anamorphosis
- Camera aperture: 0.866 by 0.732 inches (22.0 by 18.6 mm)
- Projector aperture: 0.825 by 0.690 inches (21.0 by 17.5 mm)

== See also ==
- History of the art and technique of making films
- List of motion picture film formats
- List of motion picture film stocks
- Original camera negative
