= Camera stabilizer =

Device which prevents unwanted camera motion

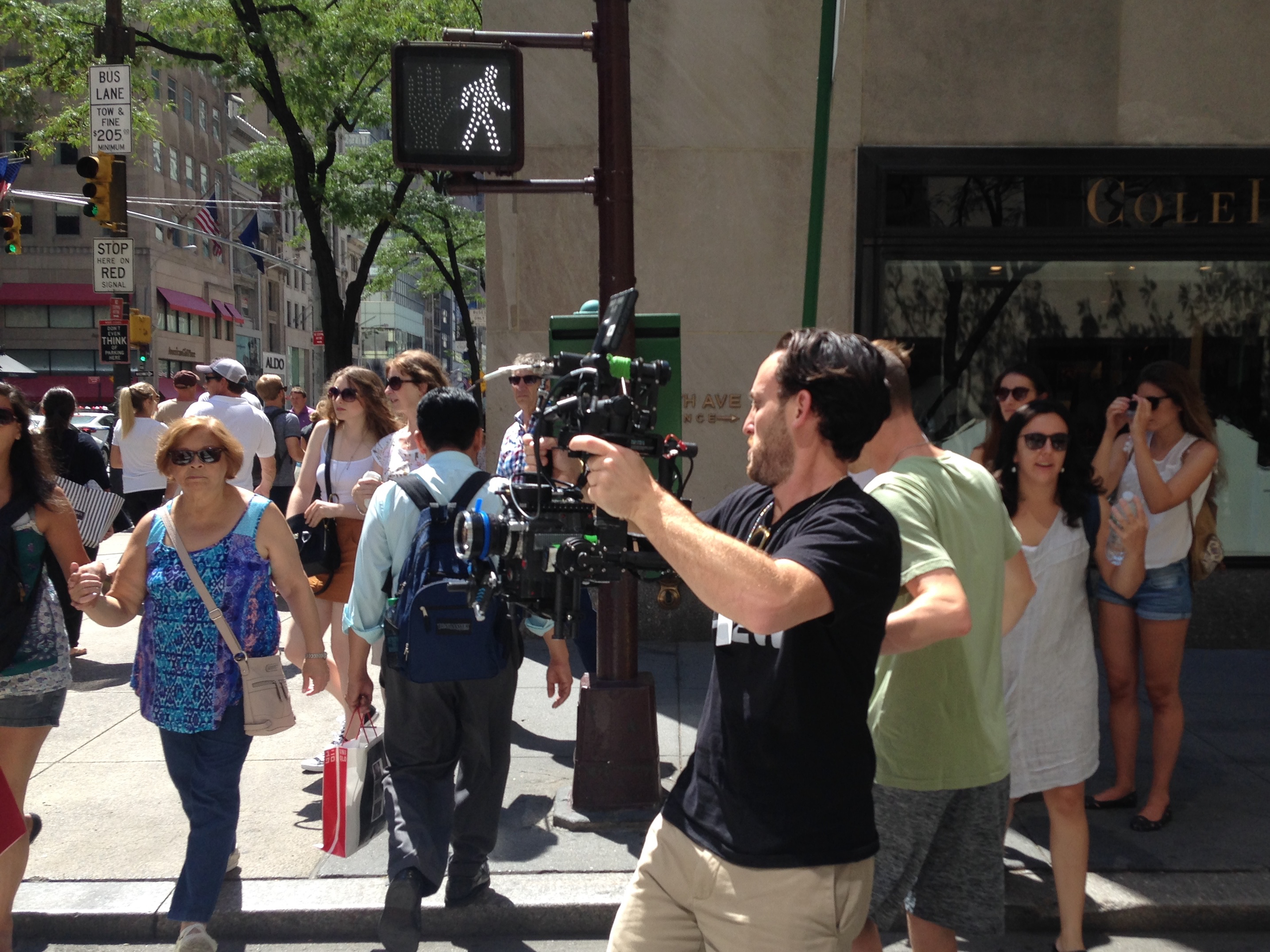
Filming with a handheld camera stabilizer

An operator uses a camera stabilizer in a low-angle shot

A camera stabilizer, or camera-stabilizing mount, is a device designed to hold a camera in a manner that prevents or compensates for unwanted camera movement, such as "camera shake".

For small hand-held cameras, a harness or contoured frame steadies the camera against the photographer's body. In some models, the camera mount is on an arm that protrudes in front of the photographer; beneath the camera is a handle grip. Another variation positions the camera atop a fulcrum brace against the photographer's chest or abdomen.

To compensate for camera instability caused by the movement of the operator's body, camera operator Garrett Brown invented the Steadicam, a body-mounted stabilization apparatus for motion picture cameras, which uses springs as shock absorbers.

In 1991, Martin Philip Stevens (Note: Born in England, 1963) invented a hand-held camera stabilizer for motion-picture and video cameras, called the Glidecam.

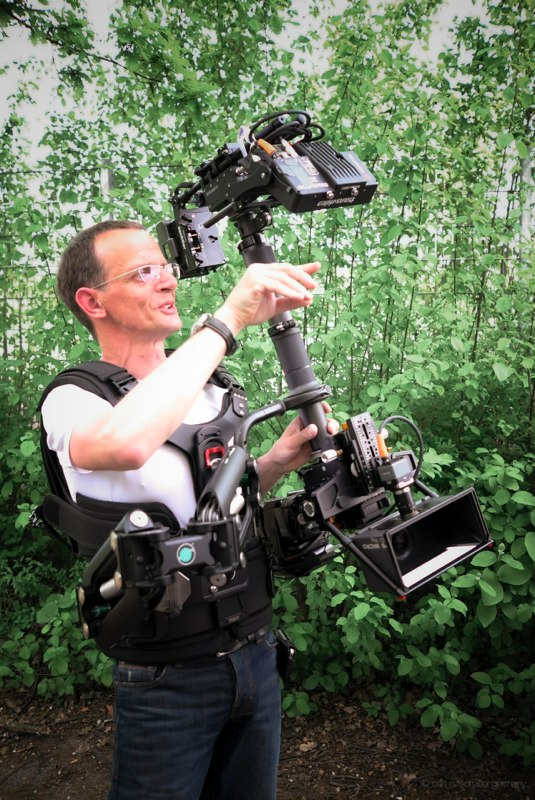
Curt O. Schaller: artemis Cine HD Pro by Sachtler

In 2001 Sachtler and Curt O. Schaller launched the artemis camera stabilizer system at the NAB Show in Las Vegas. The artemis systems were the first modular camera stabilizer systems in the world. In addition, the artemis HD systems were the first Full HD camera stabilizer systems worldwide. The artemis Trinity system, developed by Curt O. Schaller (who was responsible for the idea, concept, design, and development) together with Roman Foltyn in 2015, was the first camera stabilizer system in the world that combined a mechanical stabilization system with an electronic one. In April 2016, ARRI acquired the artemis camera stabilizer systems developed by Curt O. Schaller from Sachtler. In 2022, under the leadership of Curt O. Schaller, the second generation of the Trinity, the ARRI TRINITY 2, followed. In 2025, Curt O. Schaller and Roman Foltyn were awarded the Scientific and Engineering Award of the Academy of Motion Picture Arts and Sciences (AMPAS): Curt Schaller for the concept, design and development of the Trinity 2 system and Roman Foltyn for the software and hardware design of its motorized stabilized head. In 2026, Curt O. Schaller and Roman Foltyn were also awarded the Engineering, Science & Technology Emmy Award of the Academy of Television Arts & Sciences (ATAS) for the development of the TRINITY camera stabilization system (ARRI TRINITY 2).

Since approx. 2015, it is common to stabilize moving cameras with remote controlled camera heads. The camera and lens are mounted in a remote controlled camera holder which is then mounted on a moving dolly, such as rail systems, cable suspended dollys, cars or helicopters. For example, the Newton stabilized remote head is broadly used to stabilize moving TV cameras at live broadcasts of sports and events.

Some camera stabilization machines use gyroscopes to sense disruptive motion.

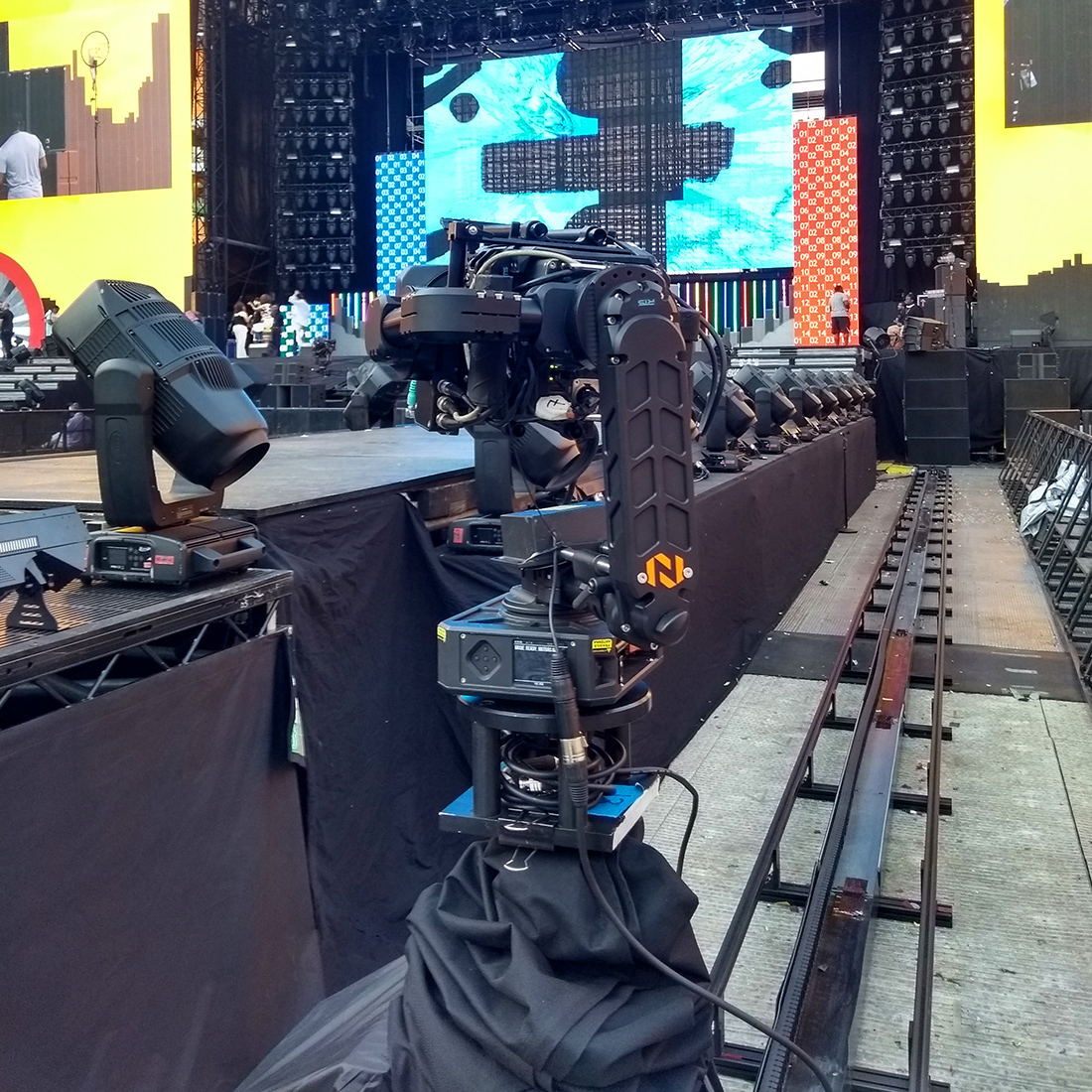
A Newton stabilized camera head on a RTS rail system on Beyoncé's tour 2018. The system moves the TV camera with stabilized remote control.

Although a tripod can hold a camera stably, stationary platforms are not regarded as camera stabilizers.

== Camera shoulder brace ==
A shoulder brace stabilizes the camera by shifting camera weight from the operator's arms to the back and shoulders. Shoulder braces free the operator's hands, and allow for smoother shots than might be obtainable by handheld operation; they may also hold one or more accessory devices, such as a zoom controller or transmitter. The shoulder straps may be padded for operator comfort.

The camera itself is mounted either to an adjustable arm or to a frame with at least one handle. Some braces have a handle to the left and right of the camera for maneuvering; a remote LANC zoom controller may be attached to one of the handles.

Braces are made of lightweight materials, such as PVC, carbon fiber, and/or aluminum. Some braces allow for the camera housing to be placed on a flat surface (such as to facilitate low shots).

== See also ==
- Image stabilization
- Gimbal
