= Gentec International =

- Industry: Consumer electronics; Distributor
- Founded: 1990
- Founder: Joel Seigel
- Headquarters: 90 Royal Crest Court, Markham, Ontario, Canada
- Area served: Canada
- Key people: Joel Seigel (President and CEO)
- Number of employees: 100

Gentec International is a Canadian distributor of consumer accessories, headquartered in Markham, Ontario, Canada.

== History ==
Founded in 1990 by Margaret Adat, Gentec International began distributing photography accessories to the Canadian retail market. Gentec outgrew two facilities in eight years, finding their current home in Markham, Ontario, in 1998. Over the years, Gentec has continued to expand into new markets, including: electronics, mobile/wireless accessories, home audio products, sporting goods and car audio.

Gentec currently operates a 100,000 sq. ft. distribution centre and employs approximately 100 full-time staff.

On October 31, 2012, Alpine Electronics announced a partnership with Gentec International that would see Gentec take over sales, marketing and service of all Alpine Mobile Media Solutions for the Canadian market. The partnership went into effect January 1, 2013.

On January 1, 2013, Gentec also took over distribution for Vitec products in Canada, including Manfrotto, Gitzo, Kata Bags and National Geographic Bags.

On September 25, 2017, the Vitec Group Int. announced their acquisition of JOBY and Lowepro. As part of this acquisition, Gentec International was able to become the sole distributor in Canada.

On July 26, 2018, Gentec International opened their Kustomworx facility to the Canadian B2B market, providing commercial installers and businesses with home and commercial audio and video technology.

== Brands ==
Gentec International represents products for over sixty brands across six markets in the Canadian consumer accessories market. Those markets include Digital Imaging, Electronics, Mobile, Audio Products, Sporting Goods and Car Audio.

=== Digital Imaging ===
Avenger, Blackrapid, DNP, Gary Fong, Gitzo, Joby, Lastolite, Lowepro, Manfrotto, Marumi, Optex, Roots, Safari Action Cameras, SanDisk, Sigma and Zeiss.

=== Electronics ===
Bell'O Furniture, Energy, iQ, Loctek, Metra and Ultralink.

=== Mobile ===
iDeal Case, iQ, iShieldz, NHL, Roots and Ultralink.

=== Audio ===
Bell'O, Klipsch and Pro-Ject Audio.

=== Sporting Goods ===
Boyt Hunting and Gun Cases, Bushnell, Energizer, Midland, Safari and Zeiss.

=== Car Audio ===
Alpine, Amber, Best Kits & Harnesses, Metra, PAC, Phoenix Gold, Sony, and Stinger.
