= Curt O. Schaller =

German cinematographer (born 1964)

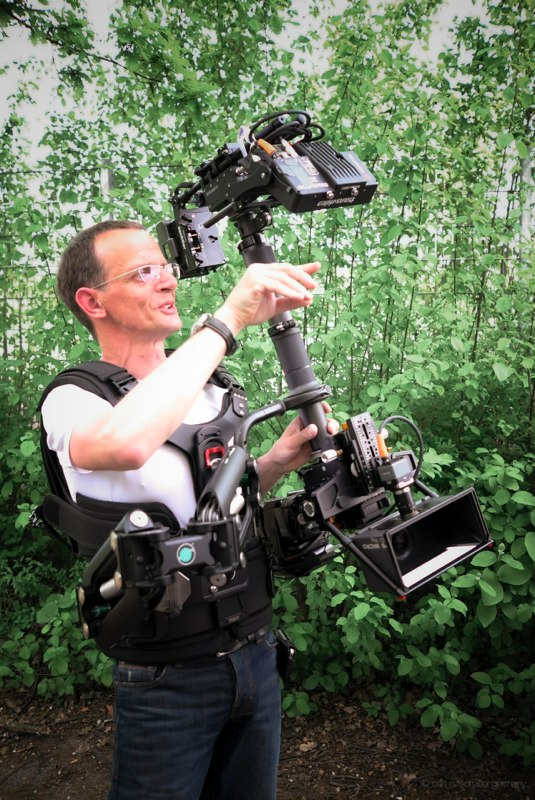
Curt O. Schaller with an artemis Cine HD Pro by Sachtler

Curt Oswald Schaller (born June 22, 1964) is a German cinematographer, Steadicam operator and photographer. He is also the developer and designer of Arri's camera stabilization systems; previously, he held the same position at Sachtler (Vitec / Videndum). In 2025, he was awarded an Academy Award for the concept, design and development of the TRINITY camera stabilization system (known as ARRI TRINITY 2). In 2026, he was also honored with an Emmy Award for the development of the TRINITY camera stabilization system (ARRI TRINITY 2).

== Career ==
In 1984, Schaller began training as a camera assistant and then as a cameraman at the Bavaria film and television studios in Munich, Germany.

Following his training, he worked as a cameraman and as a Steadicam operator in German TV series, films, shows, and documentaries.

At the end of the 1990s, Schaller used his experience as a cameraman and Steadicam operator and began to develop his own camera stabilization systems, from which the artemis series by Sachtler (Vitec / Videndum) emerged in 2001. The artemis series was the world's first modular camera stabilization system when it was launched at the 2001 NAB Show in Las Vegas. In addition, the artemis HD systems were the first full HD camera stabilization systems in the world at the time.

Schaller conceived the idea for a modular, hybrid camera stabilization system in 2012 and began the initial implementation steps in 2013, based on his artemis camera stabilization systems from Sachtler (Vitec / Videndum).

In 2015, Curt O. Schaller (who was responsible for idea, concept, design, and development) then developed the (artemis) Trinity camera stabilization system together with the engineer Roman Foltyn. It was the world's first camera stabilization system to combine a mechanical stabilization system with an electronic one: and it is considered the most advanced camera stabilization system in the world, used in films such as 1917, Mission: Impossible – Dead Reckoning Part One and Mission: Impossible – The Final Reckoning. The (artemis) Trinity camera stabilization system was first presented in 2015 at the IBC in Amsterdam (Netherlands).

In April 2016, he moved with his entire artemis product portfolio from Sachtler (Vitec / Videndum) to Arri (Riedel Group) to drive the further development of the artemis and Trinity systems as product manager for Arri camera stabilization systems.

In 2022, under his leadership, Arri (Riedel Group) launched the second generation of the Trinity - the ARRI TRINITY 2.

In January 2025, Curt O. Schaller was awarded the Scientific and Engineering Award of the Academy of Motion Picture Arts and Sciences (AMPAS) for the concept, design and development of the TRINITY camera stabilization system (ARRI TRINITY 2), which he accepted in April 2025 at the ceremony in the Academy Museum of Motion Pictures in Los Angeles (USA).

In September 2026, Curt O. Schaller was also awarded the Engineering, Science & Technology Emmy Award of the Academy of Television Arts & Sciences (ATAS) for the development of the TRINITY camera stabilization system (ARRI TRINITY 2), which he will accept on October 14, 2026 at the ceremony in the Saban Media Center of the Television Academy in Hollywood (USA).

In addition, Schaller has been active worldwide as a lecturer in the training of Steadicam and Trinity operators since 1998.

To date, Curt O. Schaller holds 19 granted patents and 27 granted intellectual property rights as an inventor in the field of film technology.

== Camera stabilization systems ==
=== ARRI ===
- ARRI ARTEMIS 2 (patented)
- ARRI ARTEMIS 2 Live
- ARRI Cine HD Pro
- ARRI EFP
- ARRI TRINITY 2 (patented)
- ARRI Trinity Gen. 1 (patented)
- ARRI TRINITY Live

=== Sachtler ===
- artemis Cine (patented)
- artemis Cine HD Pro Gen. I
- artemis Cine HD Pro Gen. II
- artemis Cine HD RGB (patented)
- artemis DV Handheld
- artemis DV Pro FX (patented)
- artemis DV Pro MD (patented)
- artemis EFP HD SDI
- artemis EFP HD SE for RED ONE
- artemis Trinity (pre-production model, patented)

== Awards ==
- 2016: Cine Gear Expo Technical Award, Los Angeles (USA): For the development of the ARRI (artemis) Trinity
- 2016: cinecAward, Munich (Germany): For the development of the ARRI (artemis) Trinity
- 2017: BIRTV Award, Beijing (China): For the development of the ARRI (artemis) Trinity
- 2025: Academy Scientific and Engineering Award (Oscar), Los Angeles (USA): For the concept, design and development of the TRINITY camera stabilization system (ARRI TRINITY 2)
- 2026: Engineering, Science & Technology Emmy Award, Hollywood (USA): For the development of the TRINITY camera stabilization system (ARRI TRINITY 2)
