= Sachtler =

- Industry: Camera Support, Broadcast Industry
- Founded: 1958
- Founder: Wendelin Sachtler
- Headquarters: Garching, Germany
- Number of employees: 150
- Website: sachtler.com

Sachtler is a manufacturer of film and video camera support products. The company was founded in 1958 and was bought by the United Kingdom's Vitec Group (now Videndum) in 1995.

== History ==
Wendelin Sachtler was a cinematographer, actor and inventor, living in South-Germany. In 1958 he designed the first tripod head. This so-called gyroscopic head provided not only pans and tilt motion, but also added gyroscopic damping to smooth out camera moves. The new tripod head proved so popular with fellow camera operators that it led to the foundation of a new company, Sachtler, to meet demand. He worked out of a small workshop in Munich-Schwabing, Germany. After a pair of moves, Sachtler is now located in Garching near Munich. Sachtler has 150 employees worldwide and is represented by retailers in more than 140 countries. The company has production facilities in Germany, Costa Rica and Great Britain.

In 1992 the company was awarded the Scientific and Engineering Award of the Academy of Motion Picture Arts and Sciences (AMPAS).

In 1995 Sachtler was acquired by the Vitec Group PLC.

In 2001 Sachtler and Curt O. Schaller launched the artemis camera stabilizer system at the NAB Show in Las Vegas. The artemis systems were the first modular camera stabilizer systems in the world. In addition, the artemis HD systems were the first Full HD camera stabilizer systems worldwide. The artemis Trinity system, developed by Curt O. Schaller (who was responsible for the idea, concept, design, and development) together with Roman Foltyn in 2015, was the first camera stabilizer system in the world that combined a mechanical stabilization system with an electronic one. In April 2016, ARRI (Riedel Group) acquired the artemis camera stabilizer systems developed by Curt O. Schaller from Sachtler. In 2025, Curt O. Schaller was awarded the Scientific and Engineering Award of the Academy of Motion Picture Arts and Sciences (AMPAS) for the concept, design and development of the TRINITY camera stabilization system (ARRI TRINITY 2). In 2026, Curt O. Schaller was also awarded the Engineering, Science & Technology Emmy Award of the Academy of Television Arts & Sciences (ATAS) for the development of the TRINITY camera stabilization system (ARRI TRINITY 2).

== Products ==
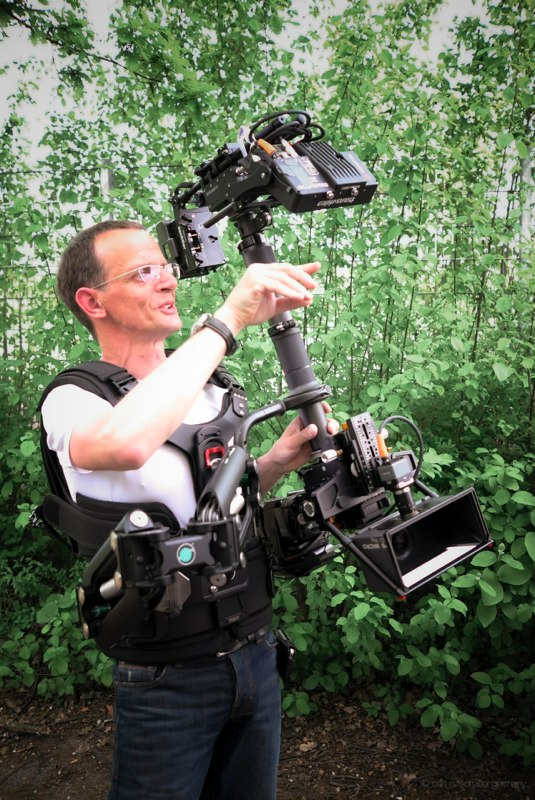
Curt O. Schaller: artemis Cine HD Pro

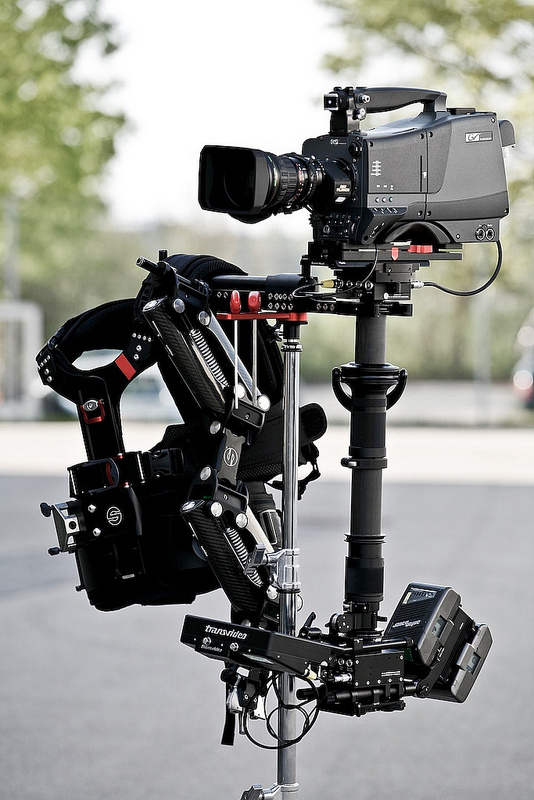
artemis Cine HD Pro

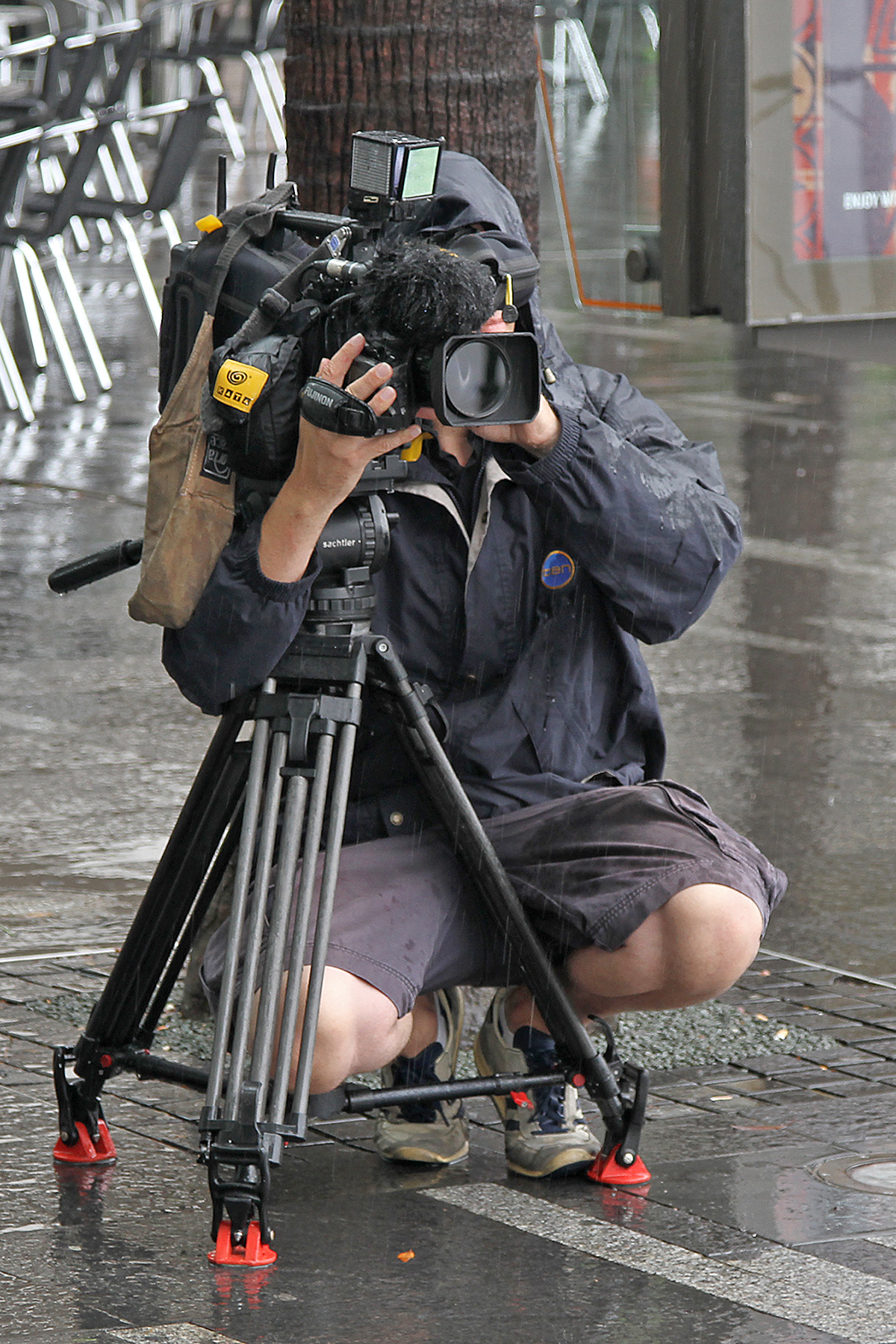
A Sachtler tripod in use

The company's portfolio can be divided into:

- Camera support
- High quality bags for storage and transportation of professional broadcast, camera and audio equipment

The camera support division includes the production of Sachtler fluid heads, tripods and pedestals and professional bags for cameramen and sound operators.
