= Lowepro =

- Type: Videndum PLC
- Founded: 1967
- Founder: Greg Lowe, Mike Lowe
- Headquarters: Petaluma, CA, United States
- Products: Camera bags, backpacks, protective cases and equipment for photography, video and electronic devices
- Website: lowepro.com

Lowepro is a brand of carrying bags for cameras, laptops, imaging accessories and portable consumer electronics with corporate headquarters in Petaluma, California. It is part of Videndum plc.

== History of the company ==
Lowepro camera bags began as an offshoot of Lowe Alpine Systems, an outdoor equipment manufacturer founded by Mike, Greg and Jeff Lowe in suburban Denver (Colorado) in 1967. In the 1960s, the Lowe brothers were known in outdoor circles for their climbing, skiing and photography. In 1967, Greg Lowe invented the world’s first close-fitting internal-frame backpack. He used the same design principles to create the Lowepro line of protective camera bags as he often carried photographic equipment on hikes and climbs in the backcountry of the Western United States. The first bag marketed for cameras was manufactured in 1972.

In 1981, Uwe Mummenhoff and DayMen Photo Marketing Inc. gained exclusive rights to produce Lowepro products under license in Canada. In 1989, Lowepro U.S.A. became a wholly owned subsidiary of DayMen Photo Marketing and was established as a corporation; the Lowepro registered trademark was bought in 2002. Brockway Moran & Partners invested in DayMen in partnership with management in October 2010. On September 22, 2017, the company was acquired by The Vitec Group plc for $10.3 million. Vitec Group changed its name to Videndum in 2022.

== Products ==
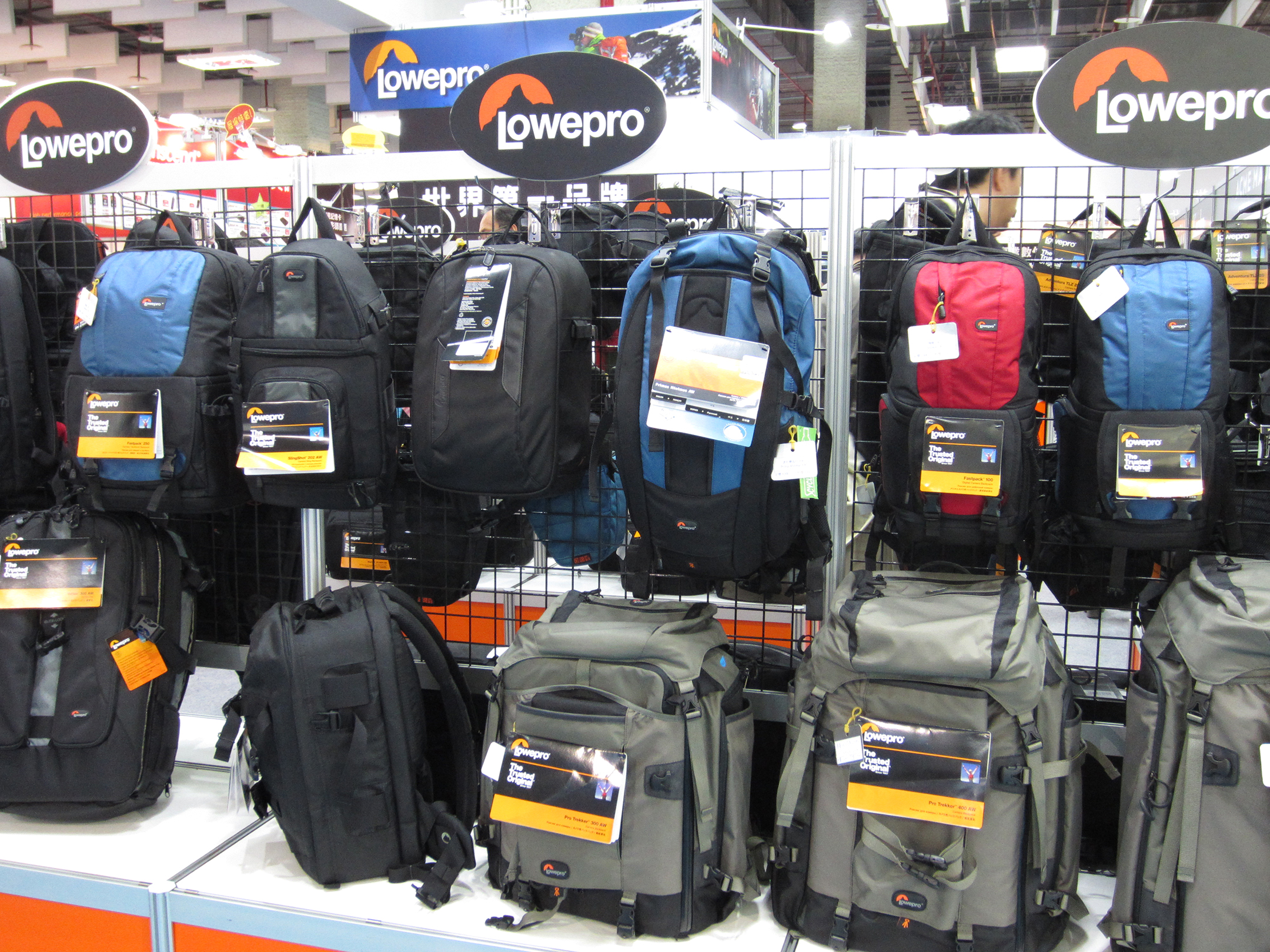
Lowepro backpacks (2011)

The Slingshot range is aimed at professional news and sports photographers, providing easy access to cameras for rapid shooting; CNet found the SlingShot 300 AW Camera Bag offered good protection and easy access. The FastPack is a rucksack-style range, which CNet found less refined.

Other products include bags for drones and laptops. Lowepro brand products are manufactured in China.
