= Manfrotto =

Italian brand of camera and lighting supports

Lino Manfrotto + Co. Spa
- Industry: Professional photographic equipment
- Headquarters: Cassola, Italy
- Area served: Global
- Products: tripods, monopods, lighting products, backgrounds, bags
- Website: www.manfrotto.com

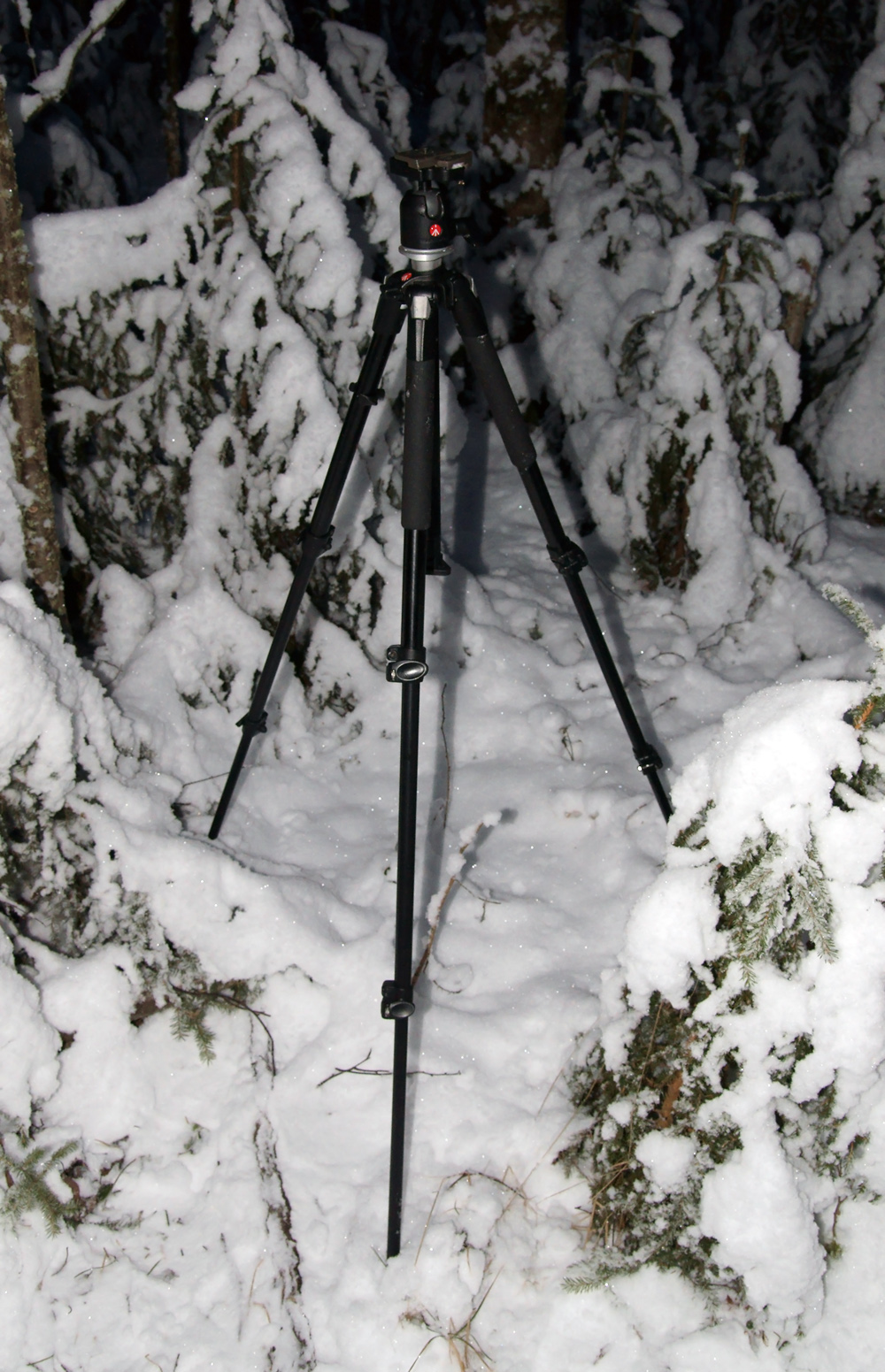
Manfrotto 190XB -tripod.

Manfrotto is an Italian brand of camera and lighting supports, including tripods, monopods, and other accessories, that is manufactured by Lino Manfrotto and Giovanni Chenet, a company headquartered in Cassola, Italy. The brand is wholly owned by Videndum plc.

== History ==
Lino Manfrotto, an Italian photojournalist, began designing and selling light stands, booms, and telescopic rods under the name "Manfrotto" in the late 1960s. In 1972, Lino Manfrotto met Gilberto Battocchio, a technician working for a Bassano mechanical firm. With the collaboration, the company introduced its first tripod in 1974. By 1986 Manfrotto already had six manufacturing plants in Bassano, and in the following two years they would build five more plants in Villapaiera, the industrial zone of Feltre.

Vinten Group purchased Manfrotto in 1989, followed by the French company Gitzo in 1992 and the American company Bogen Photo Corp. in 1993. Vinten Group chose to maintain the brands as separate lines in its portfolio. Manfrotto products are distributed in Germany, France, Italy, Japan, the United Kingdom and the United States by Manfrotto Distribution. In Canada, Manfrotto products are distributed by Gentec International.

In 2010, Manfrotto established the Manfrotto School of Xcellence, an educational resource to support and help everyone to get closer to photography and videography.

Over the years the company transformed from a simple tripod manufacturer into a manufacturer of LED lights, bags and accessories for specialists (also the National Geographic bag under license), table tripods for smartphones, even backpacks for drones that use them as landing fields. In 2017 (year of Lino Manfrotto's death) the group has, in addition to the headquarters in Cassola, factories in Feltre and Ashby-de-la-Zouch, in Great Britain, 9 commercial branches, 735 employees, a turnover of 201 million euros. 95% made with exports, 30% of the tripods sold worldwide bear the Manfrotto brand.

Lino Manfrotto died on February 5, 2017, at the age of 80.

== Advertising campaigns ==
In 2010, Manfrotto changed its brand slogan from "Manfrotto Proven Professional" to "Manfrotto Imagine More". In May 2011, Manfrotto launched an online competition asking people to share short posts about imagination on Twitter and Facebook for the Manfrotto Imagine More Manifesto, as well as to submit pictures representing imagination on the Manfrotto Imagine More website. A short film was then created based around the winning posts and pictures, debuting at the 68th Venice International Film Festival. In July 2012, Manfrotto launched the Manfrotto Imagine More blog, a web resource with tips on how to get the best out of pictures and how to share them with other people more effectively.
