= Vinten =

Brand of lightweight camera supports

- Product type: Lightweight manual and robotic camera supports
- Current owner: Videndum
- Introduced: 1909
- Markets: Television studio and outside broadcast

Vinten is a brand of lightweight manual and robotic camera supports such as tripods, pedestals, pan and tilt heads, robotic heads, and robotic tracks, many of which are aimed at the television studio and outside broadcast markets. The brand was established by William Vinten when he started manufacturing Kinemacolor projectors for Charles Urban in 1909. The brand is wholly owned by Videndum plc.

== Description ==
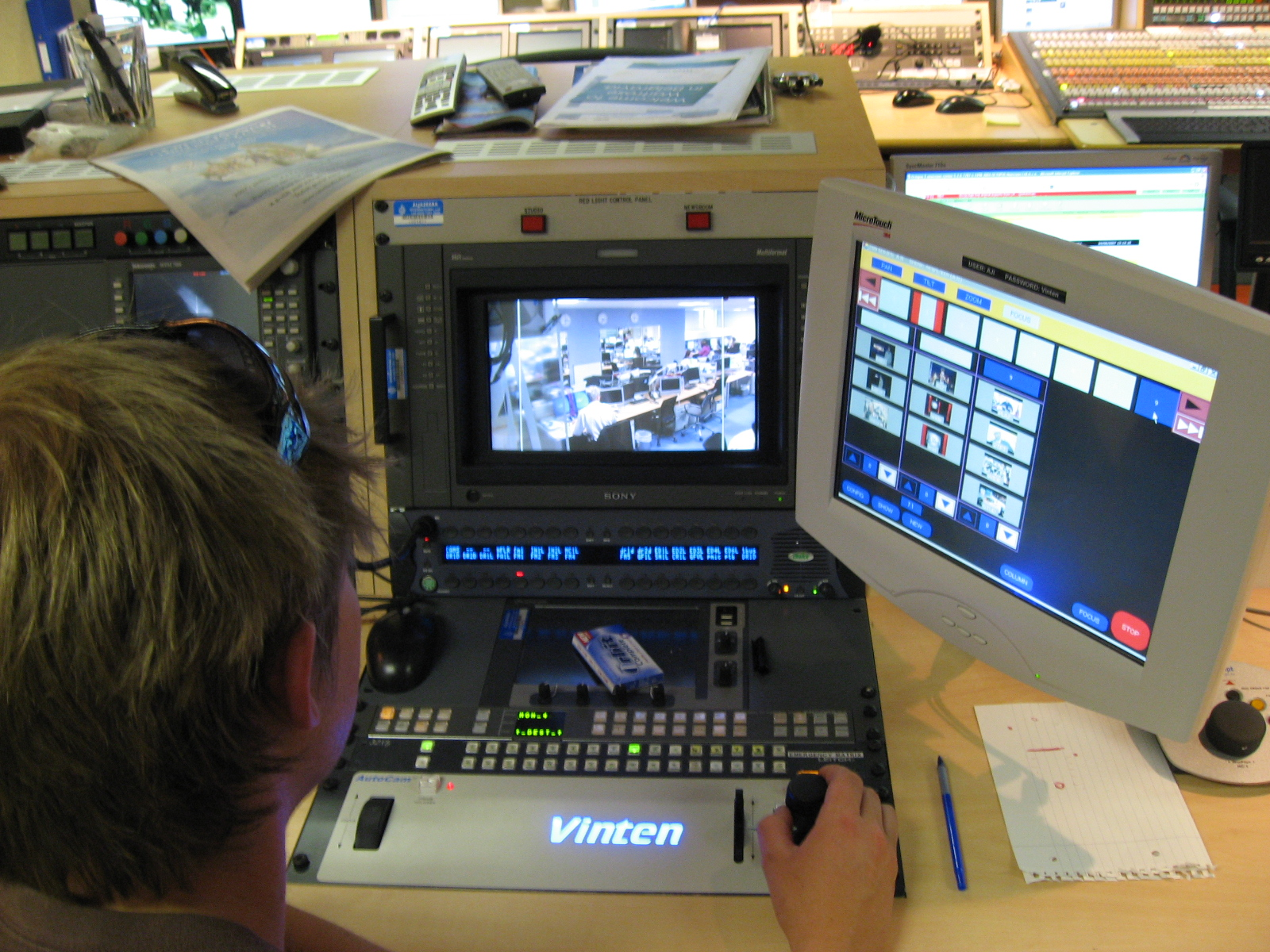
Vinten robotic camera control at Al Jazeera studios in London

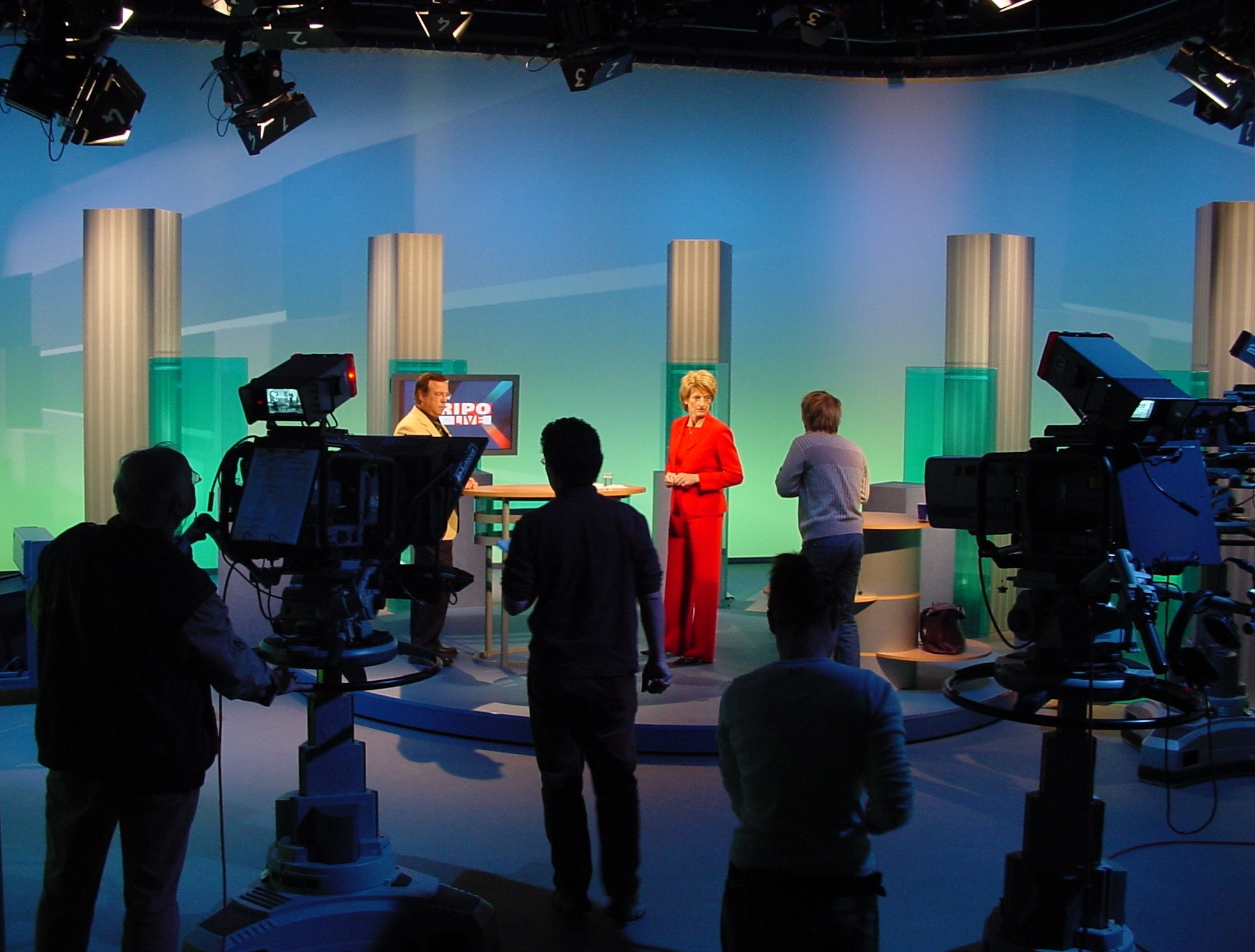
Vinten heads and pedestals being used to film "Kripo live" in Studio 1 of the MDR

Vinten is a brand of lightweight manual and robotic camera supports. Notable Vinten products include:

- Vinten HP 419: The Vinten HP 419 'Hydro-Pneumatic' gas-balanced pedestal was launched in 1957. The pedestal enabled TV cameramen to track and jib all at the same time without losing sight of the viewfinder. Many thousands of the HP 419 design were sold worldwide. Very few remain in production use, often replaced by the later Vinten Fulmar.
- Vinten Mk 3: The Vinten Mk 3 Pan & Tilt head used risers and cams to maintain the centre of gravity. This made the tilting of heavy cameras considerably easier and if correctly mounted a camera could be left at any tilt angle without lock off.
- Vinten OB Dolly: In the late 1950s Vinten's received a request via the BBC from the Queen. She asked for a less intrusive dolly to be used at Sandringham during the filming of the Royal Christmas Message. The Vinten Outside Broadcasting Dolly was designed to fulfill this requirement. The dolly, which ran on solid or pneumatic tyres, was quite narrow so it could be wheeled easily along a narrow passage or through a royal living room.
- Vinten Plover: The Vinten Plover was a compact and relatively lightweight nitrogen-balanced studio/OB pedestal using a central three-stage column and three sets of linked wheels which could be either pneumatic or solid. The centre column could be separated from the wheeled base for transportation.
- Vinten Fulmar: The Vinten Fulmar was a studio pedestal featuring a three-stage column.
- Vinten Vector: Launched on 1993, the Vinten Vector range of pan and tilt heads are used for television studios and outside broadcast television production. The first Vector head, the Vector 70, was famous for its unique pantographic counterbalance mechanism that allowed heavy broadcast cameras to be balanced without the use of interchangeable cams. The Vector 700 and Vector 750, developed from the Vector 70, can be seen in use at nearly all major broadcasting events.
- Vinten Vision: The Vinten Vision range of pan & tilt heads are used for lightweight cameras and camcorders.
- Vinten Quattro: The Vinten Quattro pedestal range was introduced in 1996 and features a four-stage column design that provides an on-shot stroke of 100 cm/39.4". The pedestal is now available in three versions: studio, outside broadcast and compact studio.
