= Gitzo =

Gitzo logo

Gitzo S.A. is a manufacturer of photographic accessories, including bags, but specialising in tripods and supports.

== History ==
Gitzo was founded in France by Arsène Gitzhoven in 1917, initially producing wooden and metal cassette filmbacks, and later expanding to include a line of cameras, shutters, and cable releases. Between 1942 and 1944 during World War II, the company produced military support systems.

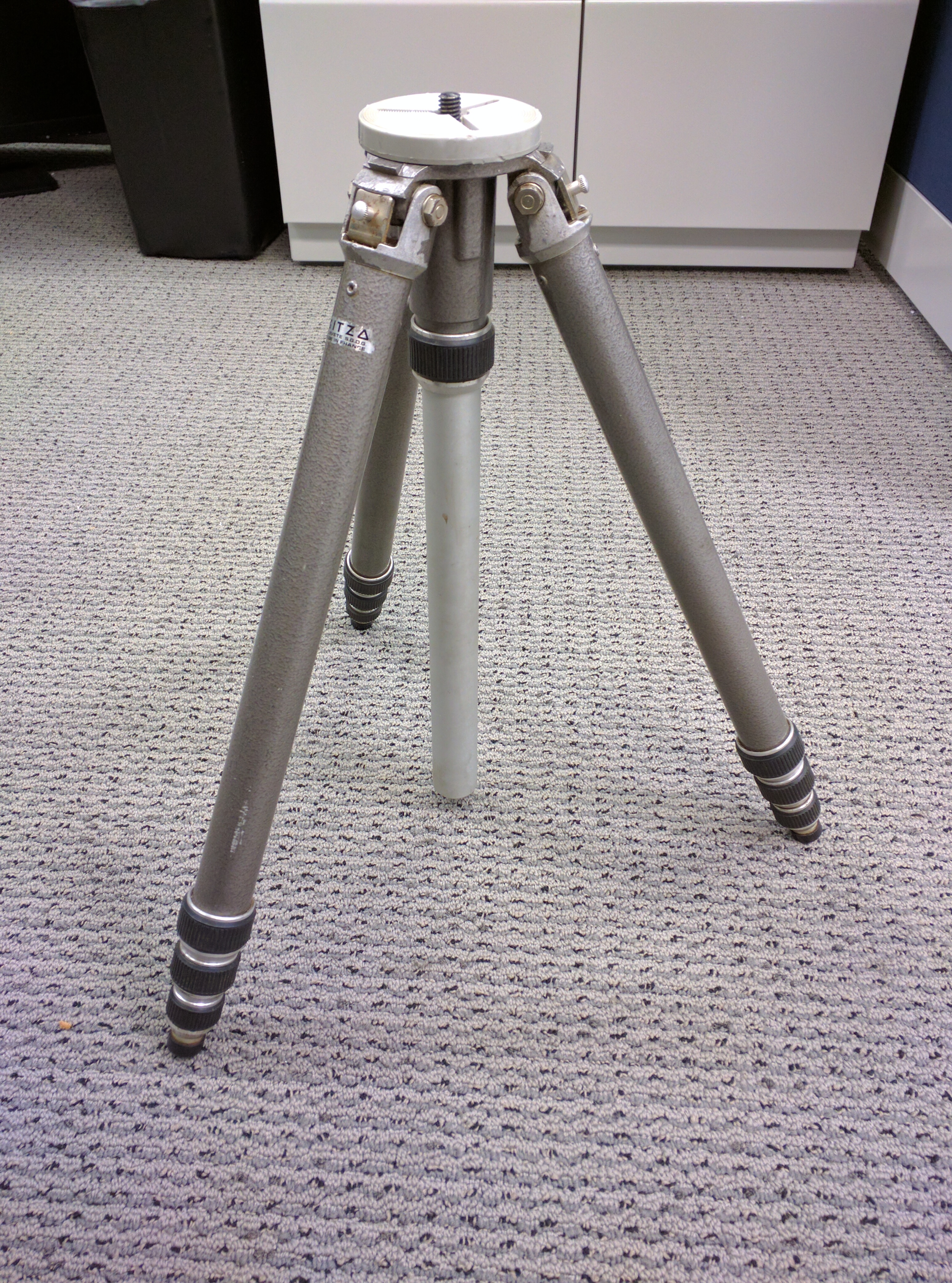
Gitzo aluminum series 2 'Reporter Performance' tripod with 4-section legs, in 'noir décor' powdercoat finish c.1980s

During the late 1940s, tripods and tripod heads were introduced into their product range, and shortly after, Gitzhoven retired in 1960, succeeded by his daughter, Yvonne Plieger, who also modeled in early Gitzo advertising photographs. She and her husband became more and more dedicated to creating a range of high quality photographic tripods. In 1950, Gitzo marketed its first tripod.

In 1992, Gitzo became part of the Vinten group (now Videndum), which also owns Manfrotto. Vitec are described in corporate literature as "a multinational holding company specialised in supporting professional photographers, broadcasters and filmmakers." 1992 also marked the discontinuance of products outside camera support systems, including tripods, monopods, and tripod heads.

Gitzo introduced the first professional carbon fiber tripod and monopod at Photokina in 1994. The Gitzo factory in Paris was expanded in 1996 to 6,200 m^{2} (67,000 sq ft).

In 2005, Gitzo completed their transfer of production from France to Italy, a process which began in 2001.

== Design ==
In August 1999, Gitzo unveiled their revised "Mk2" aluminum tripod range, eliminating the rivets in the joint connecting the leg to the shoulder and repositioning the center column lock on rapid models to above the 'spider'.

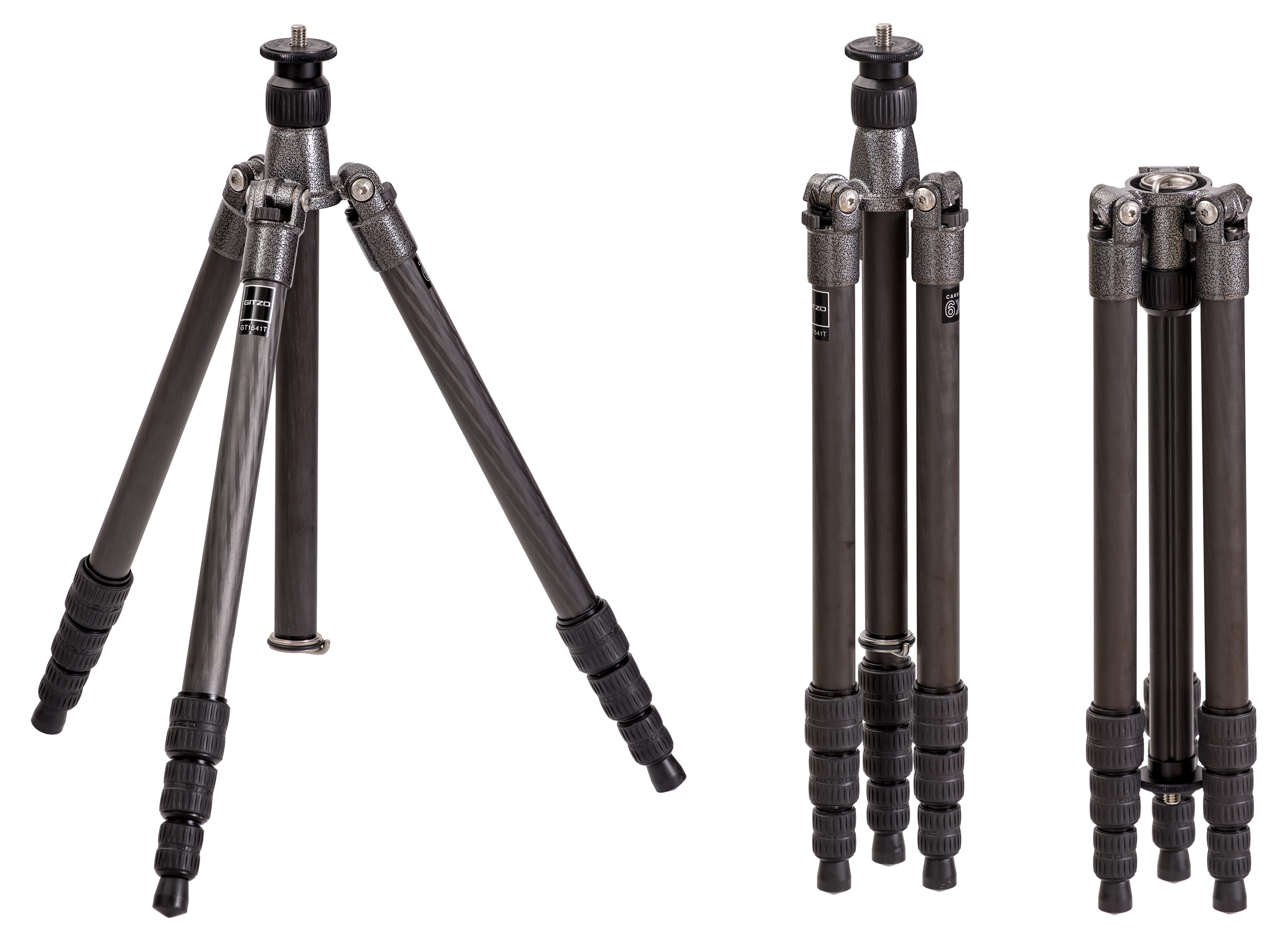
Gitzo 1541T Traveler tripod with reversible legs.

A number of different designs have been introduced under Vitec:

- Explorer (2000) – legs may be locked at any intermediate position between 0° and 90°, and the center column may be inclined relative to the 'spider' where the tripod legs come together, allowing flexibility for close-up and macro photography similar to the movements afforded by the Benbo/Uni-loc tripod range.
- Traveler (2004) – legs may be swiveled up by 180° to nest the head within the legs for a more compact fold when traveling.
- Leveling (2004) – center column may adjust by up to 12° from vertical to allow rapid leveling of camera.
- Ocean (2009) – stainless steel casting and sealed leg locks to minimize intrusion of corrosive environments, such as salt water. Discontinued by 2015.

=== Materials ===
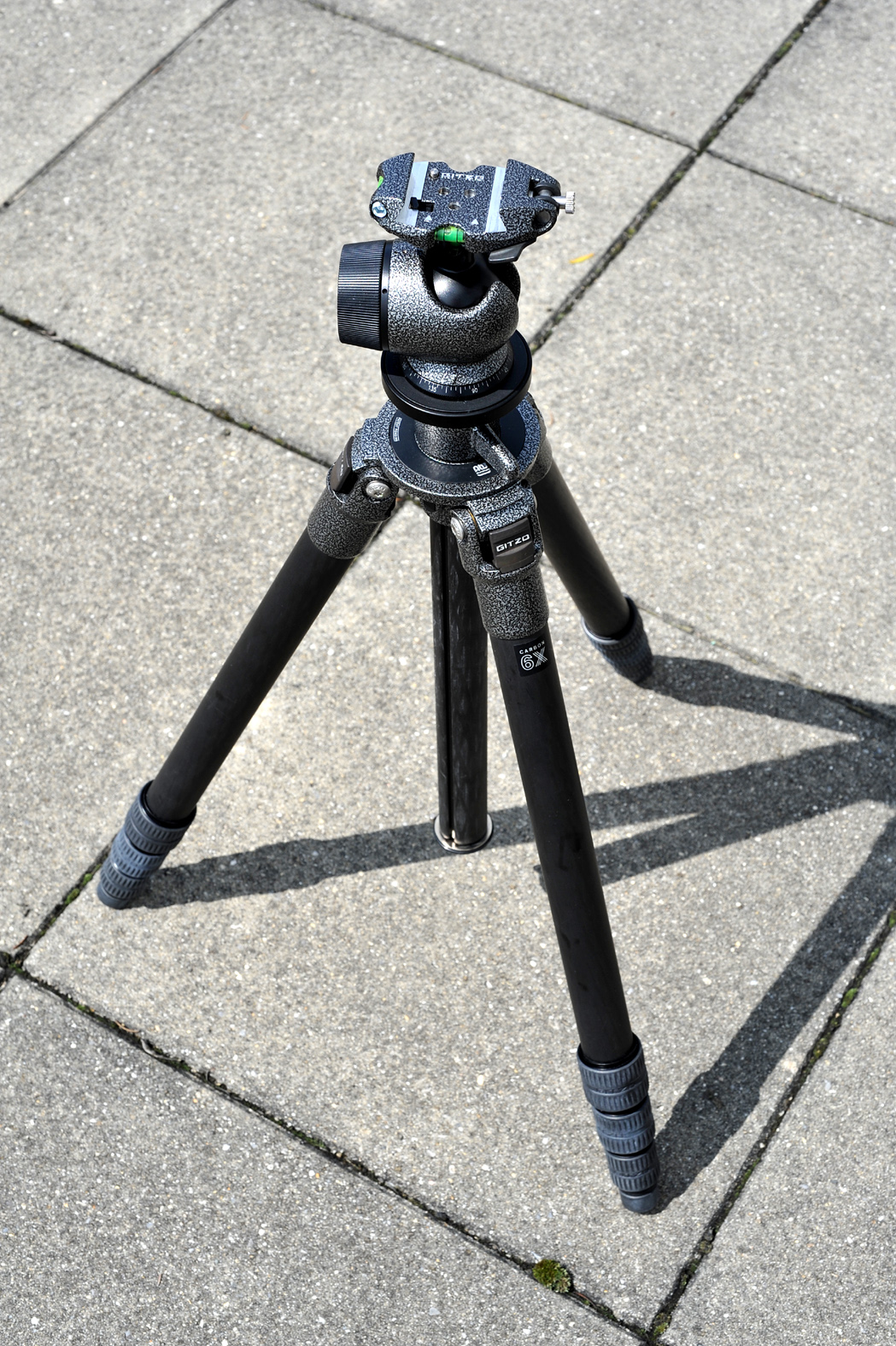
Modern Gitzo GT3541L with '6X' carbon fiber legs

Gitzo have used a variety of materials. Early Gitzo tripods and monopods were manufactured from aluminum alloys, finished in the characteristic 'noir décor' hammered grey powder coating process developed in the 1970s. In 1994, carbon fiber legs were introduced into the range. In 2004, Gitzo introduced a new "basalt" series with tubes manufactured from silica fibers drawn from crushed and melted basalt rock, touting its vibration-damping properties. By 2015, carbon fiber was the sole leg material offered.

Today, most cast parts (such as the 'spider' where the legs are joined) are made from magnesium, replacing the aluminum alloys previously used, although Gitzo have made limited production items with more exotic 'spider' materials, such as titanium (to mark their 90th anniversary) and carbon fiber (to mark their 100th anniversary).

=== Naming ===
Gitzo used a series of names interchangeably with the current "series" notation:

Gitzo naming conventions
Series	Name	Top tube diameter	Maximum load	Notes
00	Loisir or Table	16 mm 0.63 in	2.5 kg 5.5 lb	Loisir (French for 'leisure')
0	Weekend	20 mm 0.79 in	2.5 kg 5.5 lb	"MonoTrek" combination monopod/walking stick with integrated ball head has a 20mm diameter top tube.
1	Total or Sport	24 mm 0.94 in	4.5 kg 9.9 lb	Sometimes written as 'Tatalux'
2	Reporter	28 mm 1.1 in	6.0 kg 13.2 lb	
3	Studex	32 mm 1.3 in	9.0 kg 19.8 lb	Monopods offered up to "Studex" (32mm) diameter.
3	Inter Pro Studex	32 mm 1.3 in	10.0 kg 22.0 lb	Compared to Studex, includes wing lock-offs on top tube and platform interchange system instead of center column, in common with Series 4 and 5.
4	Super Studex	37 mm 1.5 in	12.0 kg 26.5 lb	In the 1987 catalogue, no wing locks and fixed leg spread (non-Performance).
4	Pro Studex	37 mm 1.5 in	12.0 kg 26.5 lb	In the 1987 catalogue, no wing locks and Performance variable leg spread. Later, wing locks were added to all Series 4.
5	Tele Studex	41 mm 1.6 in	20.0 kg 44.1 lb	

Gitzo also used the term "performance" to distinguish tripods which offered multiple leg angles of 24° and 55° (plus an additional 80° leg angle on Inter Pro Studex, Pro Studex, and Tele Studex models), compared with "standard" tripods that had a fixed leg opening angle of 24°. "Mountaineer" tripods and monopods are manufactured with carbon fiber legs. "Safari" tripods and monopods (now discontinued) featured an olive drab finish and reversed legs, where the largest-diameter section is on the bottom, to improve environmental sealing.

When center columns are fitted to tripods, "rapid" columns are secured with a friction-based twist lock and "geared" or "crémaillère" use a rack-and-pinion mechanism to adjust column height coupled with a twist lock. "Compact" and "geant" tripods feature more leg sections either for a more compact package when folded ("compact", typically four leg sections) or to reach greater heights ("geant", typically five leg sections). "Compact" is also applied to special short rapid columns intended to allow the tripod to get closer to the ground.

==== Model naming conventions ====
Products introduced after 2007 follow a standardized coding system:

G T		S		M		L/H				R		F			
Gitzo Type		Series		Material		Le.g. sections		Head type		Release/Generation		Features		Family	
B	Boom	-	Table (Note: series 00); 16 mm 0.63 in	3	Aluminum	3	3 leg sections	2	2-way	#	Rev number (Note: starts from 0 and proceeds by integers)	C	Compact (Note: replaced by the Traveler designation)	EX	Explorer (Note: variable leg spread)
C	Carrying solution (Note: bags, vests, etc.)	0	Weekend; 20 mm 0.79 in	5	Carbon fiber	4	4 leg sections	3	3-way			GT	Giant (Note: typically fitted with five or more leg sections)	F	Safari (Note: olive drab finish variant)
H	Head	1	Sport; 24 mm 0.94 in	7	Magnesium	5	5 leg sections	5	Off-center ball			L	Long (Note: taller compared to other models with the same designation)	LVL	Leveling (Note: platform or base to set head on horizontal level)
K	Kit (Note: combination of tripod legs and head)	2	Reporter; 28 mm 1.1 in	9	Basalt	6	6 leg sections	8	Center ball			O	Ocean (Note: special materials, sealing, and other features to resist corrosion)	Q	Quick Release (Note: for heads, two letters designate QR system: QR Gitzo proprietary plate; QD compatible with Arca-Swiss dovetail plates)
M	Monopod	3	Studex; 32 mm 1.3 in									XL	Extra-long	S	Systematic (Note: open spider allows interchangeable top support: rapid column, geared column, or platform) (Note: SV designates spider with built-in video bowl)
S	Accessory	4	Pro Studex; 37 mm 1.5 in											T	Traveler (Note: 180° leg fold)
T	Tripod	5	Tele Studex; 41 mm 1.6 in												

Notes

For instance, GT3541L means the product is a Series 3 (studex) carbon fiber tripod with "long" four-section legs, release/generation 1.
