= Videndum =

Film company in London

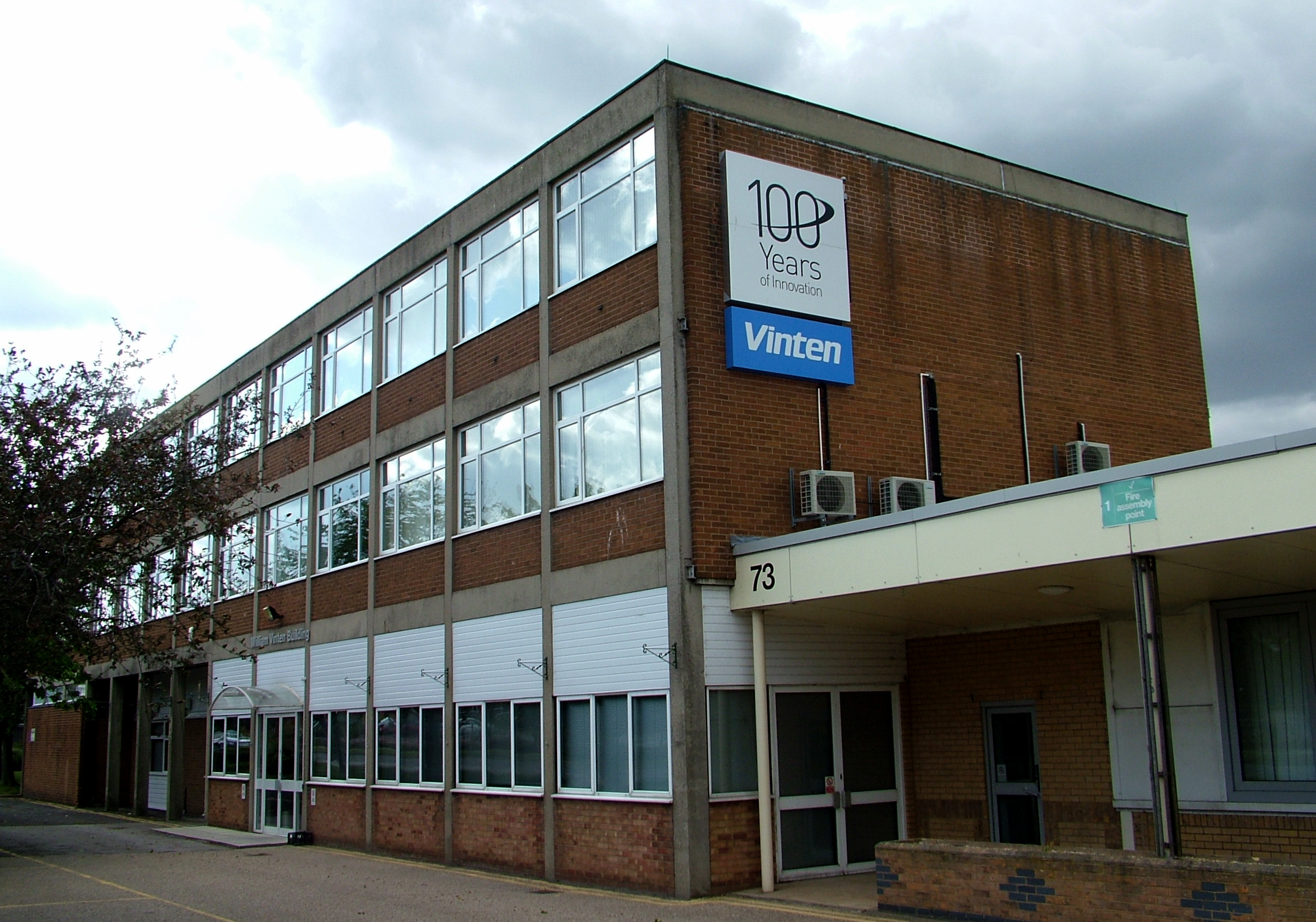
- Headquarters in Bury St Edmunds
- Type: Public limited company
- Traded as: LSE: VID
- Founded: 1910
- Founder: William Vinten
- Headquarters: Bury St Edmunds; U.K.
- Key people: Stephen Harris (Chairman); Jan Peter Tewes (CEO)
- Products: Filmmaking, video and photography equipment
- Revenue: ▼£228.3 million (2025)
- Operating income: ▲£(53.9) million (2025)
- Net income: ▲£(68.6) million (2025)
- Website: videndum.com

Videndum plc is a British manufacturer of hardware and software for the film industry and photography based in Bury St Edmunds, Suffolk. It was founded by William Vinten in 1910 and was formerly named Vinten and Vitec earlier in its history. It is listed on the London Stock Exchange.

== History ==
The business was established by William Vinten when he started manufacturing Kinemacolor projectors for Charles Urban in 1909. The company, trading as W. Vinten Cinematograph Engineers, was formed in 1910 and was originally based at 89-91 Wardour Street, London.

In 1914, the company workshops were taken over by the government and William Vinten was invited by Sopwith at Kingston upon Thames to work alongside staff at its aeroplane factory. This led in 1915 to an invitation by the Royal Flying Corps for Vinten to design and build the Model B, a special cine camera for use in aircraft.

In 1928 the company expanded and moved to Cricklewood, North London, mainly supplying the film industry by creating specialised equipment for companies such as Kodak.

The Second World War created an increased requirement for reconnaissance cameras and the company secured military contracts which gave it world market presence for reconnaissance work.

In the late 1940s the broadcast market began to flourish and the company developed the first telerecording camera. As a result, the British Broadcasting Corporation became increasingly involved with Vinten. The BBC became the world benchmark for which Vinten adapted many of its original film camera supports creating equipment more suitable for television cameras.

In 1964 Vinten moved to Bury St Edmunds in Suffolk. In 1972, the company was floated on the London Stock Exchange.

In the early 1980s the company worked in partnership with the BBC to develop pedestals, tripods and other equipment for use in its news studios.

In 1988 Vinten split into two separate entities, W Vinten Ltd (which became Thales Optronics), focused solely on reconnaissance equipment, and Vinten Broadcast, focussed on broadcast mounting equipment.

From 1989 the company began a series of acquisitions: Manfrotto (1989), Bexel (1991), Gitzo (1992), Bogen Imaging (1993), TSM Inc [known for its AutoCam product range] (1993), Sachtler (1995), OConnor (2003).

Vinten Group plc changed its name to Vitec Group plc in 1995.

Following the acquisition of Radamec in 2003 a new brand Vinten Radamec was created to take over the manufacture of robotic camera support products.

In April 2021, Vitec acquired Quasar Science, a linear LED tube manufacturer.

In May 2022, the company changed its name to Videndum plc. Vinten continues to exist as one of the group's brands.

== Operations ==
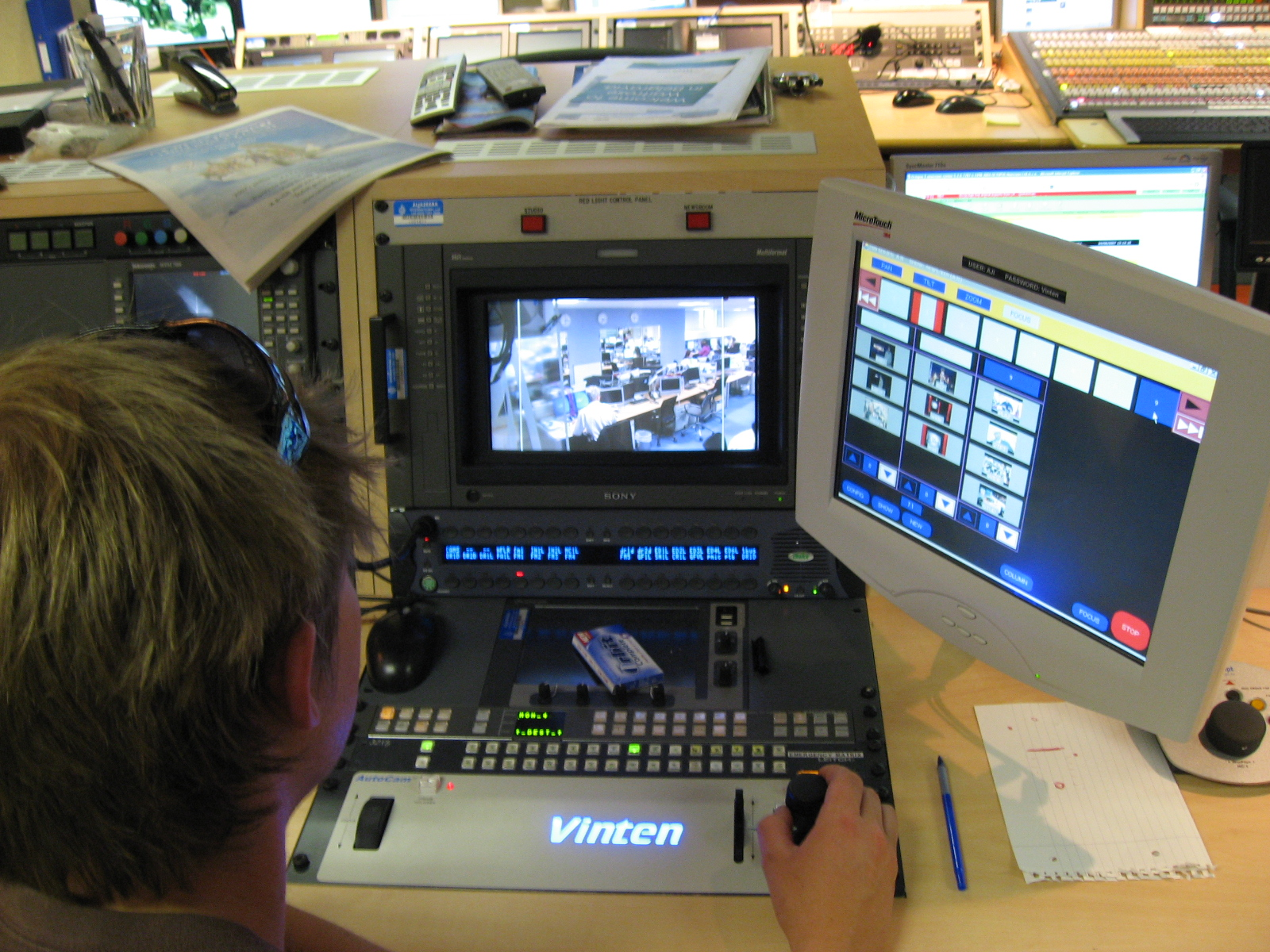
Vinten camera control system

The company's main brands include:

- Anton/Bauer
- Autocue
- Autoscript
- Gitzo
- Litepanels
- Lowepro
- Manfrotto
- Quasar Science
- Sachtler
- SmallHD
- Teradek
- Vinten
