= Riedel Communications =

German communications equipment manufacturer

Coordinates: 51.2775°N 7.1584°E

RIEDEL Communications

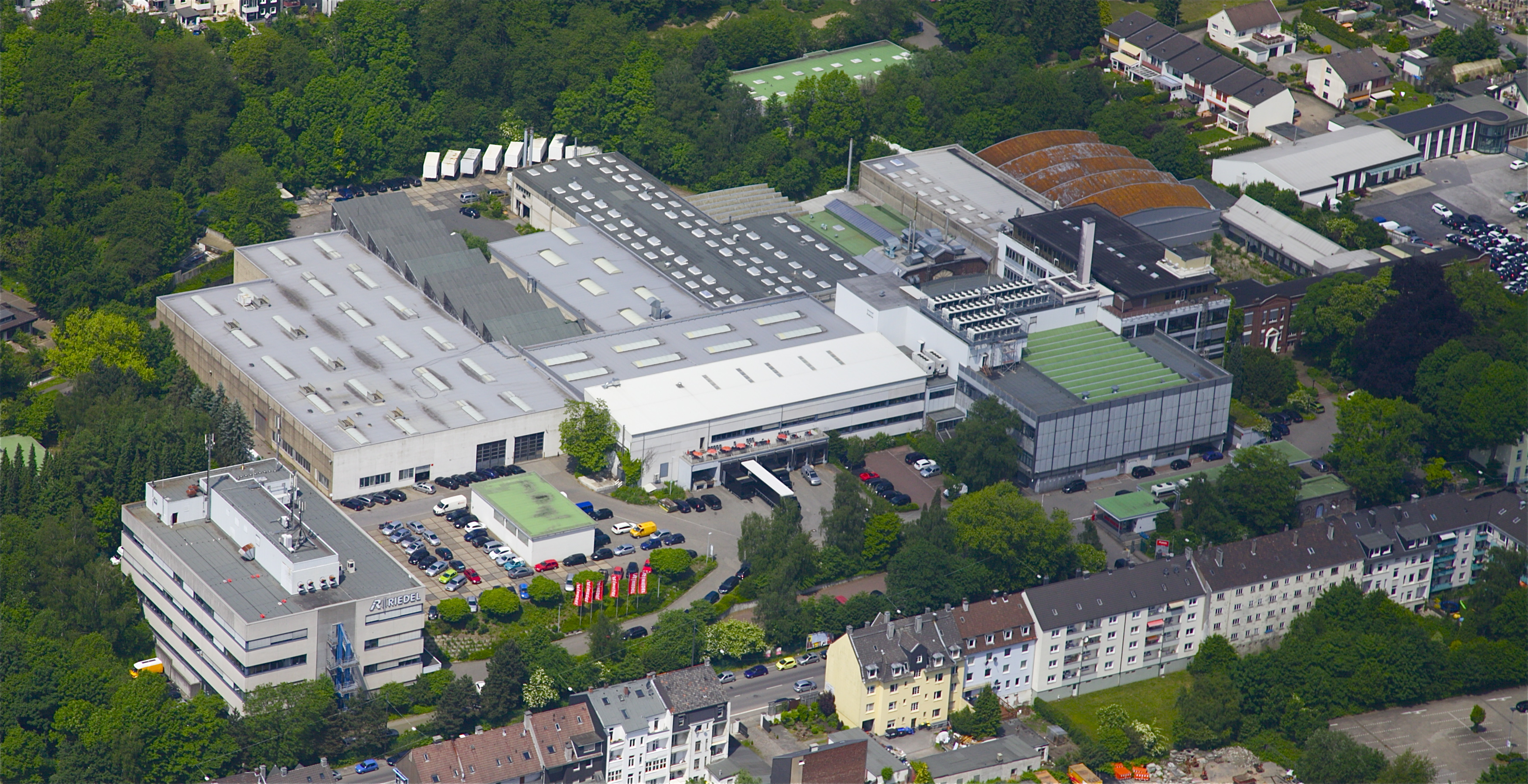
- "Riedel Technologie Park" in Wuppertal
- Native name: Riedel (/ˈriːdəl/ REE-dəl)
- Type: GmbH
- Industry: Video, Audio, Data and Communication
- Founded: 1987
- Headquarters: Wuppertal, Germany
- Key people: Thomas Riedel; Frank Eischet; Martin Berger
- Number of employees: > 700
- Website: www.riedel.net

Toruń Camerimage festival 2026

RIEDEL Communications GmbH (formerly Riedel Funk- und Intercomtechnik) is a German manufacturer of communications equipment and an equipment distributor. Riedel was founded in 1987 in Wuppertal, Germany by Thomas Riedel.

Riedel has three business segments: manufacture of communication equipment, rental services, and radio distribution. The company has over 1000 employees and is based in the RIEDEL Technologie Park (Uellendahler Str. 353 in 42109 Wuppertal, Germany).

== Description ==
Riedel's technology has been used in numerous international events, including Formula 1 races, World Championships and the Olympic Games. Many broadcasting companies, theatres and industrial facilities use Riedel systems for smaller applications and events. In 2003 Riedel won the Wuppertaler Wirtschaftspreis. It has also received three Emmy Awards.

In 2013, Riedel received an Emmy for production, features and transmission of the Red Bull Stratos – Felix Baumgartner jump out of a balloon capsule.

Riedel operates in three business fields:

• Manufacturing: Riedel designs, manufactures and distributes real-time networks for video, audio, data and communications. The products are used worldwide for broadcast, professional audio, event, sports, theatre, universities, house of worship and security applications.
• Rental service: Riedel provides radio and intercom services, event IT as well as fibre-based and wireless audio and video transmission systems. Riedel offers support services including project planning, logistics, set up and operations for projects of any size.
• Radio distribution: Riedel is one of the largest authorized Motorola business partners in Europe (in partnership since 1991).

== Milestones & History ==
2026: ARRI

- On April 14, 2026, it was announced that Thomas Riedel had acquired ARRI, the German cinema camera and lighting manufacturer, which had been privately owned and operated by the same family for 108 years.

2019: Artist-1024 and acquisition of Embrionix

- At the NAB show in Las Vegas, Riedel introduces the new Artist 1024 node.
- With the acquisition of the Canadian IP video specialist Embrionix, Riedel expands its portfolio of video

2018: RSP-1232HL SmartPanel and acquisition of Archwave and Cymatic Audio

- Riedel introduces the new 1200 Series Smartpanel at NAB 2018.
- With the acquisition of Swiss engineering pioneer Archwave, Riedel's development team is expanded to over 100 engineers.

2017: Bolero

- At Prolight & Sound 2017, Riedel Communications introduced Bolero, a new wireless intercom.

2016: ASL, Rio, and Delec

- Riedel acquires ASL Intercom BV, extending its portfolio of intercom technology.
- Riedel acquires DELEC Audio- und Videotechnik GmbH, a developer and manufacturer of digital intercom and communication systems.
- Riedel contributes to the Games more than 14.000 radios and 20.000 in-ear monitors as well as numerous MediorNet frames. In total, 400 pallets of equipment were shipped to Brazil.

2015: MicroN, MetroN and STX-200 for Skype TX

- Riedel presents MicroN an 80G Media network at the NAB show in Las Vegas.
- At the ESC in Austria MediorNet MetroN – which has enormous 320-GB real-time routing capacities and gets supplied as a 19“/2HE device – celebrate its debut.
- STX-200 for Skype TX is in use in Real Madrid and India's Got Talent for the first time. STX-200 enables the integration of professional Skype calls in live productions.

2014: Olympic Wintergames and Commonwealth Games Glasgow

- At the Olympic Winter Games in Sochi, Riedel delivered technical equipment for the venues and was involved in the TV production. Moreover, Riedel built a network for the video-, audio- and intercom signal distribution at the ten competition venues.
- For the first time Riedel is the Official Radio Communications Services Provider for the Glasgow Commonwealth Games.

2012: Red Bull Stratos

- Riedel enables the wireless transmission of video signals, signal transport and communication while Felix Baumgartner jumps out of the stratosphere. The technical transfer gets awarded with another Emmy.

2011: Eurovision Song Contest

- For distribution of the video, audio, and communication signals at the Eurovision Song Contest in Düsseldorf the organizer EBU relied on an extensive MediorNet fiber infrastructure from Riedel Communications.
- Riedel installed an integrated system of MediorNet, RockNet, Artist and Performer, which turned the football stadium in a 15.000 square meters big TV-studio.

2009: MediorNet

- Riedel launches MediorNet, the world’s first fiber-based video network for integrated signal transport.

2005: Red Bull Air Race

- Riedel provides Red Bull Air Race with extensive communication and transmission technology. In the following years Riedel wins two Emmy Awards for the production.

2004: Partyline and Olympic Games

- Performer, the worldwide first Digital Partyline Intercom System, is launched.
- Riedel at the Olympic Games in Athens: All venues were provided with Artist Intercom and Performer Digital Partyline for the first time. Riedel attended all Olympic Games since 2004.

2002: Olympic Winter Games

- For the first time a Riedel Artist Intercom System is used at the Olympic Winter Games in Salt Lake City at the opening and closing ceremonies

2000: EXPO & Artist

- Artist, the worldwide first decentralized Digital Matrix Intercom System, is launched by Riedel.
- Extensive participation at the EXPO 2000 in Hannover

1998: FIFA Worldcup

- Extensive delivery of radio systems for the ARD and ZDF in all stadiums of the FIFA WC 1998 in France. Riedel attended every FIFA World Cup since 1998.

1994: Olympic Games

- Riedel receives its first contract for the Olympic Games in Lillehammer. Besides the Olympic Summer and Winter Games, Riedel provides equipment for global events, like FIFA World Cup, the UEFA Euro, the Asia Games and the Eurovision Song Contest today.

1993: Formula One

- Riedel starts equipping Formula One with communications. Today the FIA, and most of the teams as well as the DTM, the WCR rally and other racing events rely on Riedel systems and services.

1991: Motorola and RiFace

- Riedel manufactures its first product: RiFace, an interface between radio and intercom.
- Riedel becomes a Motorola distribution partner.

1987: Founded in Wuppertal, Germany

== Products ==
Manufactured products:

- Intercom: ARTIST // TANGO // PERFORMER // BOLERO
- Media networks: MEDIORNET // FUSION // VIRTU
- Audio networks: ROCKNET
- Apps for video: MUON // MICRON

Managed technology products:

- Radio and intercom
- Fiber infrastructure
- Signal distribution
- IT, Wi-fi, internet access
- Network monitoring and remote control
- Cashless payment
- Emergency evacuation systems
- Crowd management
- Accreditation
- Weather monitoring
- Drone detection
- Video surveillance/CCTV

== Locations worldwide ==
- Australia
- Austria
- China
- France
- Germany
- Japan
- Netherlands
- Russia
- Scandinavia
- Singapore
- Spain
- Switzerland
- United Arab Emirates
- United Kingdom
- USA

Engineering hubs:

- Montreal, Canada
- Porto, Portugal
- Vienna, Austria
- Zurich, Switzerland
