= Canon EOS C100 =

2012 Super-35 digital cinema camera

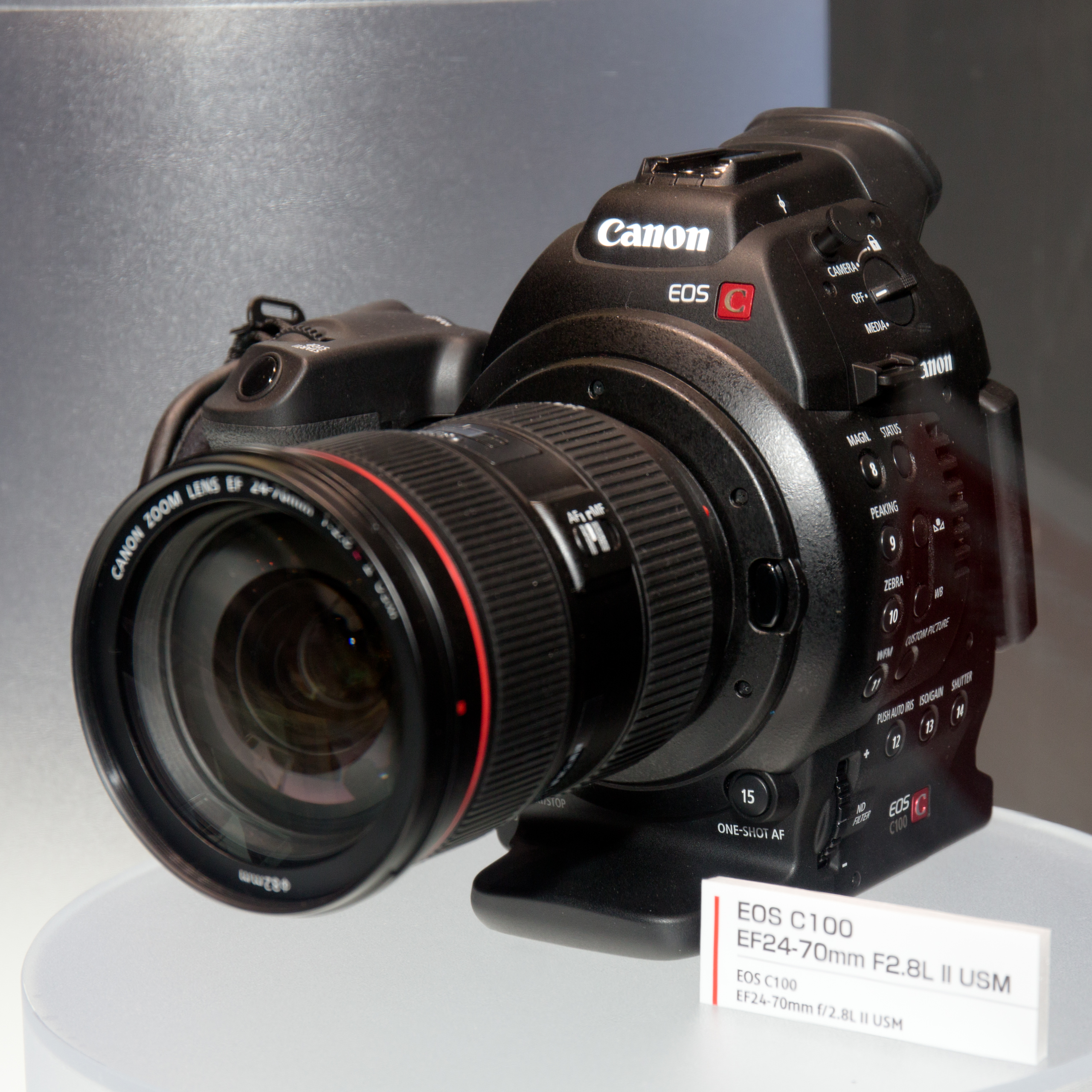
- The Canon EOS C100

Overview
- Maker: Canon
- Type: Digital cinema camera

Lens
- Lens: Interchangeable (EF)
- F-numbers: Lens dependent

Sensor/medium
- Sensor type: CMOS
- Sensor size: Super 35 (24.6mm x 13.8mm)
- Maximum resolution: Full HD (1920 x 1080)
- Film speed: 320–20,000 ISO
- Recording medium: SD cards (dual slot)

Focusing
- Focus: Manual, one-shot autofocus

Viewfinder
- Viewfinder: Electronic, 1,555,000 dots, 0.61 cm, 100% coverage

General
- Battery: BP-9
- Weight: 1,020 g

The EOS C100 is a digital cinema camera made by Canon, announced on August 29, 2012. It was the third camera from the Canon Cinema EOS line to be released, and is the budget camera in the range, being less expensive than both the EOS C300 and EOS C500, going on sale at a recommended price of $7,999. However, unlike the other models, it only shoots in Full HD.

The camera has an EF lens mount, making it compatible with EF, EF-S and EOS EF Cinema lenses.

== Specifications ==
- Canon Super 35mm CMOS Sensor
- AVCHD Codec
- Three Built-In ND Filters
- Push Auto Iris/One-Shot AF
- Canon Log Gamma
- Canon Wide Dynamic Range (DR) Gamma
- Fully compatible with all Canon EF, EF-S and EF Cinema Lenses
- Dual SD Card Slots
- 29 Custom Picture Settings
- Waveform Monitor/Edge Monitor Focus Assist
- HDMI Output With Time Code
- Built-In Microphone
- Twin XLR Connectors in Handle
- Compatibility with Third-Party Accessories
- Price approx: $6,000 USD

	2012	2013	2014	2015	2016	2017	2018	2019	2020	2021	2022	2023	2024	2025
Standard							C700 FF							
Standard						C700								
Standard		C500							C500 MK II					
Standard													C400	
Standard	C300				C300 Mk II						C300 Mk III			
Standard							C200							
Standard													C80	
Standard		C100		C100 Mk II						C70				
MILC											R5C			
DSLR		1D C												
