= Canon EOS C300 Mark III =

2020 Super-35 digital cinema camera

The Canon EOS C300 Mark III is Canon's second update to its first generation cinema camera, the Canon C300, and is part of the Canon Cinema EOS line. Its innovation was mainly a shift from the DIGIC-V to the DIGIC-VII processor. It was released in 2020.

== Specifications ==
- 9.6 mp 4206x2280 Super 35 CMOS sensor for 4k and UHD resolutions
- DIGIC-VII processor
- Canon XF-AVC (10 bit 4:2:2 (CFexpress) or 8 bit 4:2:0 (SD card)) Cinema RAW Light (CFexpress) codecs
- dual CFexpress 2.0 (Type B) slots compatible with SD card
- light sensitivity 100 to 102,400 ASA
- Dual Pixel CMOS autofocus
- uses BP-A30 14.4 V batteries
- availability: mid-2020
- price: approximately US$9.000 (2024)

	2012	2013	2014	2015	2016	2017	2018	2019	2020	2021	2022	2023	2024	2025
Standard							C700 FF							
Standard						C700								
Standard		C500							C500 MK II					
Standard													C400	
Standard	C300				C300 Mk II						C300 Mk III			
Standard							C200							
Standard													C80	
Standard		C100		C100 Mk II						C70				
MILC											R5C			
DSLR		1D C												
