= Canon EOS C300 Mark II =

2015 Super-35 digital cinema camera

The Canon EOS C300 Mark II is Canon's update to its first generation cinema camera, the Canon C300, and is part of the Canon Cinema EOS line. Notable new features compared to the previous model are the implementation of a sensor capable of a 15-stops of dynamic range, 4K XFAVC and 12-bit internal recording, color matrices, and the ability to record raw motion video via external recorder.

A Mark III-version of the EOS C300 was released by Canon in 2020.

== Sample footage ==
Canon sponsored the production of "Trick Shot", the first short film to make use of the Canon C300 Mark II, directed by Evan Kaufmann.

== Specifications ==
- 8.85mp 4206x2340 Super-35 CMOS sensor (QFHD resolution)
- Dual-DIGIC DV5 Processor
- Canon XF-AVC Codec
- Dual CFast Card Slots
- Peak ASA of 102,400
- Dual Pixel Autofocus with Face Detection
- 10-bit Canon Log 2 Gamma available (including previous Canon Log gamma)
- Uses BP-A30 batteries
- Sold as a system, including LCD monitor / XLR audio unit, side grip, and top handle.
- Availability: Sept. 2015
- Price: appx. US$16,000 (original), $7,499 (current)

	2012	2013	2014	2015	2016	2017	2018	2019	2020	2021	2022	2023	2024	2025
Standard							C700 FF							
Standard						C700								
Standard		C500							C500 MK II					
Standard													C400	
Standard	C300				C300 Mk II						C300 Mk III			
Standard							C200							
Standard													C80	
Standard		C100		C100 Mk II						C70				
MILC											R5C			
DSLR		1D C												
