= Canon EOS C100 Mark II =

2014 Super-35 digital cinema camera

Overview
- Type: Digital cinema camera

Lens
- Lens mount: EF

Sensor/medium
- Sensor type: CMOS
- Sensor size: Super 35 (26.2 mm x 13.8 mm)
- Maximum resolution: Full HD (1920 x 1080 px)
- Storage media: SD/SDHC/SDXC card (two slots)

The Canon EOS C100 Mark II is the 5th digital cinema camera in the Cinema EOS range, announced on October 22, 2014. The camera has been available as of December 2014.

	2012	2013	2014	2015	2016	2017	2018	2019	2020	2021	2022	2023	2024	2025
Standard							C700 FF							
Standard						C700								
Standard		C500							C500 MK II					
Standard													C400	
Standard	C300				C300 Mk II						C300 Mk III			
Standard							C200							
Standard													C80	
Standard		C100		C100 Mk II						C70				
MILC											R5C			
DSLR		1D C												
