= Canon EOS C200 =

2017 Super-35 digital cinema camera

Overview
- Type: Digital cinema camera

Lens
- Lens mount: EF

Sensor/medium
- Sensor type: CMOS
- Sensor size: 24.6 x 13.8 mm
- Maximum resolution: 4096 x 2160
- Storage media: SD card, CFast 2.0

Shutter
- Frame rate: 59.94fps (4K); 120fps (HD)

General
- Battery: Canon BP-A30; Canon BP-A60
- AV port(s): HD/SD-SDI; HDMI (Type A); Ethernet; 3.5mm stereo headphone monitor XLR (2 channel); 3.5mm mic jack Timecode in/out Genlock
- Weight: 3.2lbs/1.43kg

The Canon EOS C200 is a digital cinema camera in the Cinema EOS range. It was announced by Canon on May 31, 2017. It is available in two options: as the production-ready C200 with an EVF, LCD monitor, handle and handgrip accessories; or as the standalone camera body C200B.

The EOS C200 records 12-bit RAW in Canon's proprietary Cinema RAW Light video format to CFast 2.0 card — which is approximately 1/3 to 1/5 the file size of their standard RAW format. Editing and grading of Canon's Cinema RAW Light video format is supported in Adobe Premiere Pro CC 2018, DaVinci Resolve 14, and Assimilate Scratch v9. It can additionally record 8-bit 4:2:0 AVC to SD card and an uncompressed 4:2:2 signal to HDMI recorders.

== Specifications ==
- 8.85MP 4096x2160 Super 35 CMOS sensor
- Dual DIGIC DV 6 processors
- 4K DCI and UHD, 1920 x 1080
- 120p, 59.94p, 50p, 29.97p, 25p, 24p, 23.98p
- 12-bit Canon Cinema RAW Light codec
- Integrated EVF, 2 x XLR audio inputs
- Rotating 4" LCD monitor, camera grip
- Timecode out only
- 1x CFast card slot, 2x SD card slots
- Dual Pixel CMOS AF technology
- Price (USD): $7,499 (C200); $5,999 (C200B). Price of C200B dropped to $2,499 in January 2023.

	2012	2013	2014	2015	2016	2017	2018	2019	2020	2021	2022	2023	2024	2025	2026
Standard							C700 FF								
Standard						C700									
Standard		C500							C500 MK II						
Standard														C400	
Standard	C300				C300 Mk II						C300 Mk III				
Standard							C200								
Standard														C80	
Standard		C100		C100 Mk II						C70					
MILC											R5C				
MILC															R6 V
DSLR		1D C													
