= Canon EOS C500 =

2012 Super-35 digital cinema camera

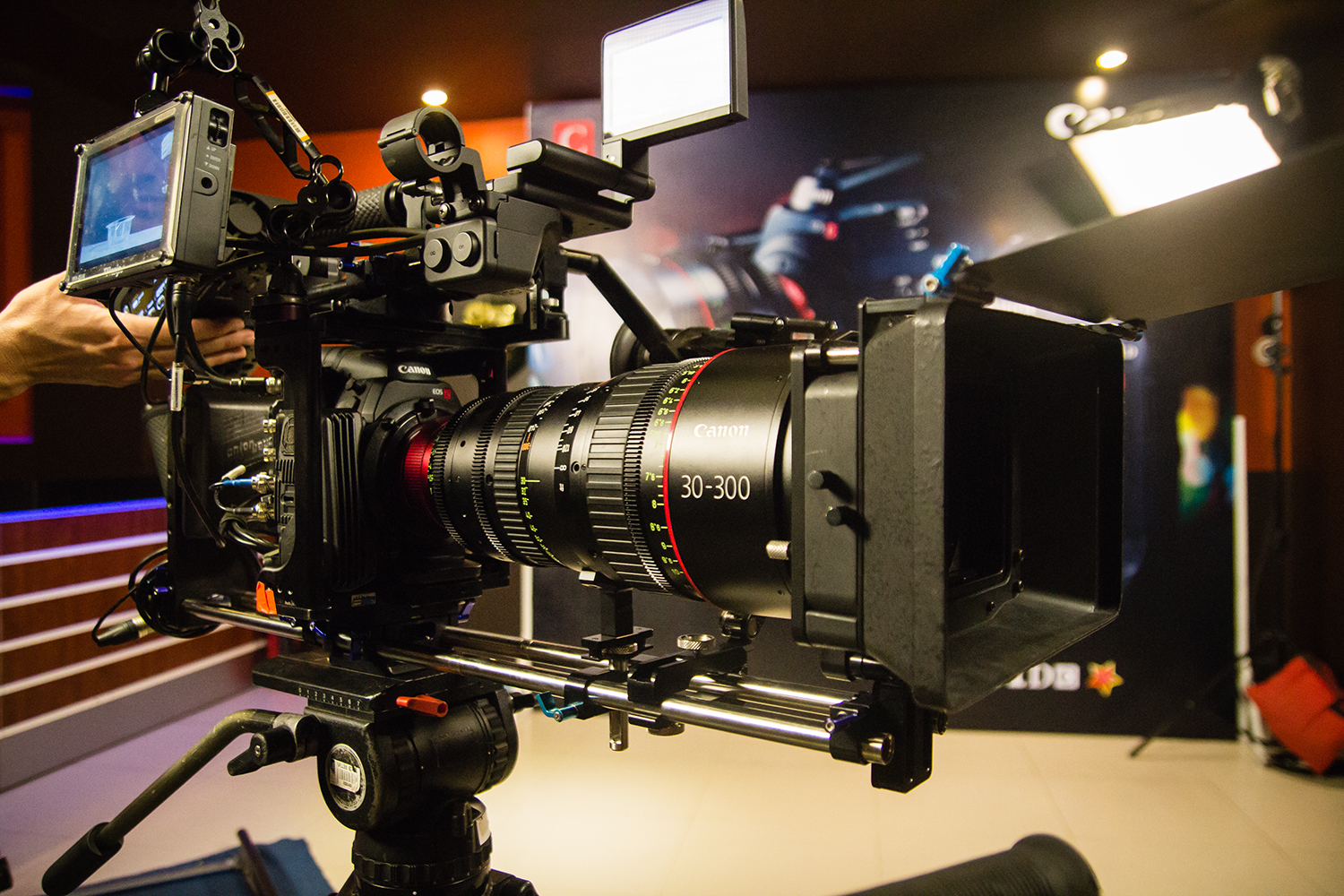
- A Canon EOS C500 with CN-E 30-300mm Cine lens

Overview
- Maker: Canon Inc.
- Type: Digital cinema camera

Lens
- Lens mount: EF/PL

Sensor/medium
- Sensor type: CMOS
- Sensor size: Super 35 (26.2 mm x 13.8 mm)
- Maximum resolution: 4K (4096 x 2160), UHD (3840 x 2160), 2K (2048 x 1080), HD (1920 x 1080)
- Storage media: CompactFlash (CF) (Type I or Type II)

General
- AV port(s): 3G-SDI; HDMI; 3.5mm stereo headphone monitor XLR (2 channel); 3.5mm mic jack Timecode in/out Genlock; Sync out (3D)

Chronology
- Successor: Canon EOS C500 II

The EOS C500 is a digital cinema camera released by Canon in August 2012. The camera is offered with the option of Canon EF or Arri PL mounts. As of 2017, the camera has dropped significantly in price.

== Camera ==
The Canon EOS C500 is Canon's second camera to form part of the Canon Cinema EOS line, complementing the previous Canon EOS C300. Notable new features compared to the previous camera are the addition of 4K and QHD motion video capture to the previous HD capture of the C300 and the ability of the C500 to record raw motion video to the Motion RAW format as well as raw still video to Still RAW format.

The camera has been known to have a fan noise issue that was met with a firmware update in 2014.

== Specifications ==
- 8.85mp Super-35 CMOS sensor
- Outputs EOS Cinema RAW (uncompressed undebayered raw stream)
- Frame rate up to 120fps at 4k
- Availability: late 2012
- Price: MSRP $30,000 USD

	2012	2013	2014	2015	2016	2017	2018	2019	2020	2021	2022	2023	2024	2025
Standard							C700 FF							
Standard						C700								
Standard		C500							C500 MK II					
Standard													C400	
Standard	C300				C300 Mk II						C300 Mk III			
Standard							C200							
Standard													C80	
Standard		C100		C100 Mk II						C70				
MILC											R5C			
DSLR		1D C												
