= Atomos (company) =

Australian video equipment company

Atomos Limited
- Type: Public
- Traded as: ASX:AMS
- Industry: Video technology
- Founded: 2010
- Founders: Jeromy Young & Ian Overliese
- Headquarters: Melbourne, Australia
- Key people: Peter Barber (CEO)
- Products: Video monitor-recorders, cloud production tools, video production products
- Website: www.atomos.com

Atomos is an Australian company primarily engaged in manufacturing and distribution of video equipment specifically 4K and HD Apple ProRes capable monitor recorders. Its products are widely used in video production, including social media, YouTube, television, and cinema. Atomos has contributed to the adoption of Apple ProRes RAW format in Cinema Cameras. Atomos has introduced several technical features that have influenced modern video workflows, including RAW recording over HDMI, wireless timecode synchronization, support for multi-camera recording and asynchronous switching, and integrated live streaming functionality.

== History ==
Atomos logo, circa 2019

The company was founded in 2010 by Jeromy Young & Ian Overliese. Initially launching products like the Ninja and Samurai, Atomos focused on allowing camcorders such as the Sony EX1 and EX3 to achieve BBC broadcast standards through uncompressed SDI output.

In 2014, Atomos released the Ninja Star recorder, notable for its small size. This compact device didn't have an LCD screen. However, once synchronized with a camera's signal, it offered reliable performance and portability. Over the years, Atomos has transitioned from producing HD recorders like the screenless Ninja Star to advanced 4K recorders with HDR monitoring capabilities, as seen in their Ninja and Shogun models. Atomos has been collaborating with companies such as Nikon, Canon Inc., Fujifilm, OM Digital Solutions, Sony and Panasonic. These partnerships have facilitated the adoption of codecs such as ProRes RAW in selected cameras.

Beginning in 2024, Atomos expanded into other product categories, including lighting, audio, PTZ cameras and video transmitters.

May 3 2025, Peter Barber, co-founder of Blackmagic Design was appointed CEO after joining Atomos in February 2024.

== Products ==
Atomos has developed a diverse range of products over the years, including:

Ninja 5" Monitor-Recorders

- Ninja V / V+
- Ninja
- Ninja Ultra
- Ninja Phone
- Ninja TX
- Ninja TXGO

Shogun 7" Monitor-Recorders

- Shogun Classic
- Shogun Ultra

Shinobi 5 & 7" monitors

- Shinobi GO
- Shinobi II
- Shinobi 7RX

Larger format studio Monitor-Recorders

- Sumo 19SE
- Neon

Broadcast rack switcher

- Shogun Studio
- Shogun Studio 2.

Accessories for Ninja V, Ninja V+, Ninja and Ninja Ultra

- ATOMOS CONNECT
- AtomX CAST

== Some notable products included ==
=== Sapphire 8K Global Shutter Sensor ===
In 2022, Atomos announced the Sapphire 8K Global Shutter Sensor. This full-frame sensor supports DCI 8K (8192 x 4320) global shutter recording at up to 60fps, 4K recording at 240fps, and 1080p at 360fps.

This high-performance full-frame sensor received the "Innovation of the Year 2022" award at the Lucie Technical Awards.

=== Atomos Connect ===
Atomos Connect is a modular expansion accessory designed to attach directly to the back of a Ninja V, Ninja V+, Ninja or Ninja Ultra monitor-recorder via its AtomX expansion port. Once connected, it provides networking features, SDI input, wireless timecode synchronization, and camera to cloud capabilities that are not available on the standalone monitor-recorder.

The device is primarily used by filmmakers, broadcasters, and content creators who require live streaming, camera-to-cloud uploads, or multi-camera synchronization.

== Global Presence ==
Atomos is headquartered in Melbourne, Australia. It has an internationally distributed team and offices that are located in several countries: the USA, Japan, Singapore, Hong Kong, China, the UK, and Germany. The company has established a strong global network of distribution partners.

== Usage in Popular Media ==
Atomos products have been used in various film and television productions, such as:

- "Birthday Wish" short film by cinematographer Amy Dellar
- "The Creator," a high-budget Hollywood sci-fi movie
- International production collaboration using Atomos' Neon 24 monitors
