= Canon EOS C50 =

2025 full-frame compact cinema camera

Overview
- Maker: Canon Inc.
- Type: Mirrorless
- Released: November 2025
- Intro price: US$3899 (body and handle)

Lens
- Lens mount: Canon RF
- Lens: Interchangeable

Sensor/medium
- Sensor type: CMOS
- Sensor size: Full-frame (36×24 mm)
- Sensor maker: Canon Inc.
- Maximum resolution: 6960×4640 pixels (32.3 MP)
- Recording medium: 1× CFexpress 2.0 (Type-B); 1× SDXC

Focusing
- Focus: Dual Pixel CMOS AF II

Shutter
- Frame rate: 40 fps
- Shutter: Electronic rolling shutter
- Shutter speed range: 30s – 1/2000s (video); 30s – 1/8000s (photo)

Image processing
- Image processor: DIGIC DV7

General
- Video recording: Full-sensor 6960×4640 at up to 25 fps, DCI 4K at up to 120 fps, DCI 2K at up to 180 fps
- LCD screen: 7.5 cm (3.0 in) 900×600 touchscreen, live preview
- Battery: LP-6P
- AV port: 1× HDMI Type-A
- Data port: 1× USB 3.2 Gen2 Type-C
- Dimensions: 142×88×95 mm (5.6×3.5×3.7 in)
- Weight: 670 g (24 oz) (body only)

Chronology
- Predecessor: Canon EOS R5 C

References
- Europe, Canon. "Canon EOS C50 Video Camera Specifications". Canon Europe.

The Canon EOS C50 is a professional full-frame mirrorless camera produced by Canon and announced on 9 September 2025 as part of the company's Cinema EOS range of digital movie cameras. The C50 succeeds the hybrid Canon EOS R5 C.

== Features ==
As a cinema camera, the EOS C50 lacks an electronic viewfinder. All available kits include a top handle that can be attached to the main camera body. This top handle includes additional audio inputs and multiple controls. Like its predecessor, the C50 includes an active cooling system to prevent overheating while in operation.

The EOS C50 features a 32-megapixel full-frame active-pixel sensor with dual conversion gain at film speeds of ISO 800 and 6400 for the high and low gain steps, respectively. The sensor is capable of recording full-resolution video with the sensor's full width and height, making the EOS C50 the first Canon camera capable of "open-gate" recording.

== Reception ==
Prerelease reception to the EOS C50 was positive. Digital Camera World noted the camera's improved specifications over the comparable Sony FX3, particularly its open gate video capabilities. CineD stated that the C50 outperforms its competition in most respects, though noted that its lack of a mechanical shutter and in-body image stabilization gave the FX3 an advantage for still photography. TechRadar praised the C50's improvements over the Canon EOS R5 C with respect to video production, namely the ability to rig the camera with accessories that could not be used on the latter.

== See also ==
- Canon EOS R5 C
- Sony FX3
