= Cinema Camera (2012) =

Blackmagic Cinema Camera
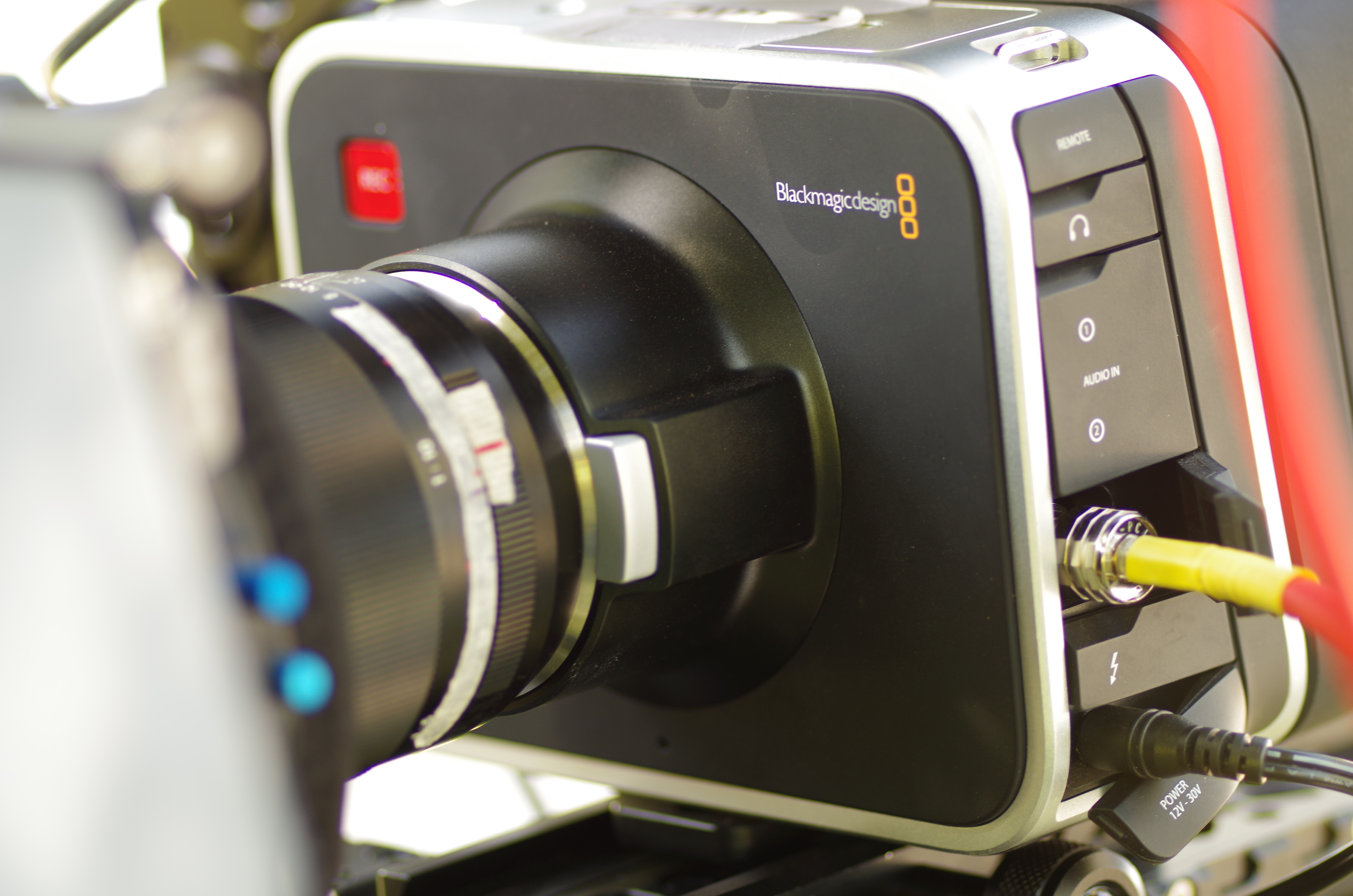

Overview
- Maker: Blackmagic Design
- Type: Digital movie camera
- Released: September 4, 2012; 13 years ago

Lens
- Lens mount: Canon EF (Active); MFT; ZE; Arri PL
- Lens: Interchangeable

Sensor/medium
- Sensor size: 16.64 mm × 14.04 mm (0.655 in × 0.553 in) (Actual); 15.6 mm × 8.8 mm (1.56 cm × 0.88 cm) (Active)
- Maximum resolution: 2432 x 1366
- Recording medium: raw, CinemaDNG, Apple ProRes and/or Avid DNxHD onto SSD

Shutter
- Frame rate: 23.98 fps; 24 fps; 25 fps; 29.97 fps; 30 fps

General
- Battery: Integrated rechargeable LiPo
- AV port: SDI
- Data ports: TRS; Phone connectors; LANC; Thunderbolt
- Dimensions: 4.9 in × 6.5 in × 4.46 in (12.4 cm × 16.5 cm × 11.3 cm)
- Weight: 3.3 lb (1.5 kg)
- Made in: Australia

The Blackmagic Cinema Camera (often simply the Cinema Camera or BMCC) is a digital movie camera developed and manufactured by Blackmagic Design and released on September 4, 2012.

It is the first model in the Cinema Camera family of digital movie cameras. The camera records 2.5K video in CinemaDNG raw, Apple ProRes and Avid DNxHD formats. The Cinema Camera line was subsequently expanded with multiple Pocket, Micro and Cinema Camera models featuring newer sensors and higher recording resolutions.

== History ==
At the NAB Show in April 2012, Blackmagic Design announced and demonstrated the Cinema Camera and slated for its release on July with an initial price of US$2,995. However, in August, the release date was delayed for "final stages of Thunderbolt certification and internal testing". A passive Micro Four Thirds model was then announced at IBC in September for release in December, along with a collaboration with Arri for a set of kits exclusively for the camera.

Alongside the announcement of the Pocket Cinema Camera and Production Camera 4K at NAB in April 2013, the price was dropped from its initial value to US$1,995 on August. It was then given an Arri PL model, as well as the Production Camera 4K, in September 2014. On October, a firmware update allowed the cameras to format solid-state drives within the camera. In March 2015, another update added lossless raw capability.

Following the release of the original Cinema Camera, Blackmagic Design continued to expand the Cinema Camera product line with several new models. These included the Micro Cinema Camera in 2015, the Pocket Cinema Camera 4K in 2018, the Pocket Cinema Camera 6K later that year, the Pocket Cinema Camera 6K Pro in 2021, the Pocket Cinema Camera 6K G2 in 2022, and the full-frame Cinema Camera 6K in 2023. These later models introduced newer image sensors, higher recording resolutions, Blackmagic RAW recording, and additional hardware improvements, while the original Cinema Camera remained notable as the company's first digital cinema camera and the product that established the Cinema Camera line.

== Design ==
=== Specifications and hardware ===
The Cinema Camera can be bought in Canon EF, MFT and Arri PL models, although the EF is the only model native to the Carl Zeiss ZE mount. All models include DaVinci Resolve with purchase. The camera is 4.9 in × 6.5 in × 4.46 in (12.4 cm × 16.5 cm × 11.3 cm) and weighs 3.3 lb (1.5 kg) and the TRS, phone connector, LANC, Thunderbolt and SDI ports are on the right side, while the slot for solid-state drives are on the right. The device also offers 13 stops of dynamic range through every shot.

The Camera has a 5" 800x480 LCD touchscreen display and dedicated buttons that can play and pause, stop, skip, focus and record media, access the menu and to power on the device. It can record raw, CinemaDNG, Apple ProRes and Avid DNxHD onto 2.5K and 1080p resolutions, as well as lossless 2.5K raw, in 23.98, 24, 25, 29.97 and 30 fps.

=== Software ===
The device runs on a proprietary software called Camera Utility, which mainly powers the interface and system. However, unlike most systems which update through firmware over the air, updates to the software must be done on a computer through USB and are obtained through Blackmagic's Support Center. Files shot through the camera can be viewed individually and metadata, such as shot, scene and take numbers, can be assigned to each one. The SSD can also be internally formatted, instead of manually removing it and formatting on another platform, into exFAT and HFS+.
