= Blackmagic Design =

Australian cinema manufacturer

Blackmagic Design Pty Ltd
- Type: Private
- Industry: Digital cinema Manufacturing
- Founded: 7 September 2001; 25 years ago
- Founder: Grant Petty
- Headquarters: 180 Bank Street, South Melbourne, Victoria, 3205, Australia
- Number of locations: 10 offices (2026)
- Area served: Worldwide
- Key people: Grant Petty (CEO)
- Products: Digital movie cameras Digital cinematography Video editing software
- Website: blackmagicdesign.com

Blackmagic Design Pty Ltd is an Australian company that develops digital cinema technology and manufactures professional video production hardware and software. Headquartered in South Melbourne, it is known for producing high-end digital movie cameras and a range of broadcast and post-production equipment. The company also develops software applications, including the DaVinci Resolve application for non-linear video editing, color correction, color grading, visual effects, and audio post-production.

== History ==
Blackmagic Design Pty Ltd was founded on 7 September 2001 by Grant Petty. Its first product, DeckLink, introduced in 2002, was a video capture card for macOS that supported uncompressed 10-bit video, marking a shift toward professional-grade yet affordable video workflows. Subsequent versions—including the DeckLink 2, Pro SDI, HD Plus, and Multibridge—added capabilities such as color correction, Windows support, and compatibility with major editing software like Adobe Premiere Pro, to broaden the product's appeal.

At the 2012 NAB Show, Blackmagic announced its first Cinema Camera, a digital movie camera.

Blackmagic made several acquisitions over the next decade. In 2009, it acquired da Vinci Systems, known for its color-grading tools. In 2010, it acquired Echolab's ATEM switcher line, in 2014, it added eyeon Software (developer of the Blackmagic Fusion compositing software) and London's Cintel (film scanning and restoration), and in 2016, it acquired Fairlight, an audio technology company known for its CMI synthesizers as well as mixing consoles.

== Products ==
List of all products developed by the company.

Digital Cinema Cameras
PYXIS		PYXIS 6K^{FF} (2024) - PYXIS 12K^{FF} (2025)	
URSA	URSA 4K^{S35} (2014) - URSA 4K v2^{S35} (2015) - URSA 4.6K^{S35} (2015)		
URSA	Cine	URSA Cine 12K^{FF} (2024) - URSA Cine 17K^{65} (2024)	
URSA	Mini	URSA Mini 4K^{S35} (2015) - URSA Mini 4.6K^{S35} (2016) - URSA Mini Pro 4.6K^{S35} (2017) - URSA Mini Pro 4.6K G2^{S35} (2019) - URSA Mini Pro 12k^{S35} (2020)	
Cinema Camera		Cinema Camera^{2.5K} (2012) - Cinema Camera 6K^{FF} (2023)	
Cinema Camera		Pocket	Pocket Cinema^{S16} (2013) - Pocket Cinema 4K^{MFT} (2018) - Pocket Cinema 6K^{S35} (2019) - Pocket Cinema 6K Pro^{S35} (2021) - Pocket Cinema 6K G2^{S35} (2022)
Cinema Camera		Micro	Micro Cinema^{S16} (2015)
Production Camera			Production Camera 4K^{S35} (2013)
Live Production Cameras
URSA Broadcast		URSA Broadcast^{2/3"} (2018) - URSA Broadcast G2^{S35} (2021)	
Studio Camera	Studio Camera HD/4K^{MFT} (2014) – Studio Camera 4K Plus^{MFT} (2018) – Studio Camera 4K Pro^{MFT} (2021) – Studio Camera 6K Pro^{S35} (2021) – Studio Camera 4K Pro G2^{MFT} (2023) – Studio Camera 4K Plus G2^{MFT} (2023)		
Studio Camera	Micro	Micro Studio 4k^{MFT} (2015) - Micro Studio 4k G2^{MFT} (2023)	
^{65}:65mm | ^{FF}:Full Frame | ^{S35}:Super 35 | ^{2.5K}:2.5k Sensor | ^{MFT}:Micro Four Thirds | ^{MFT}:Micro Four Thirds | ^{S16}:Super 16

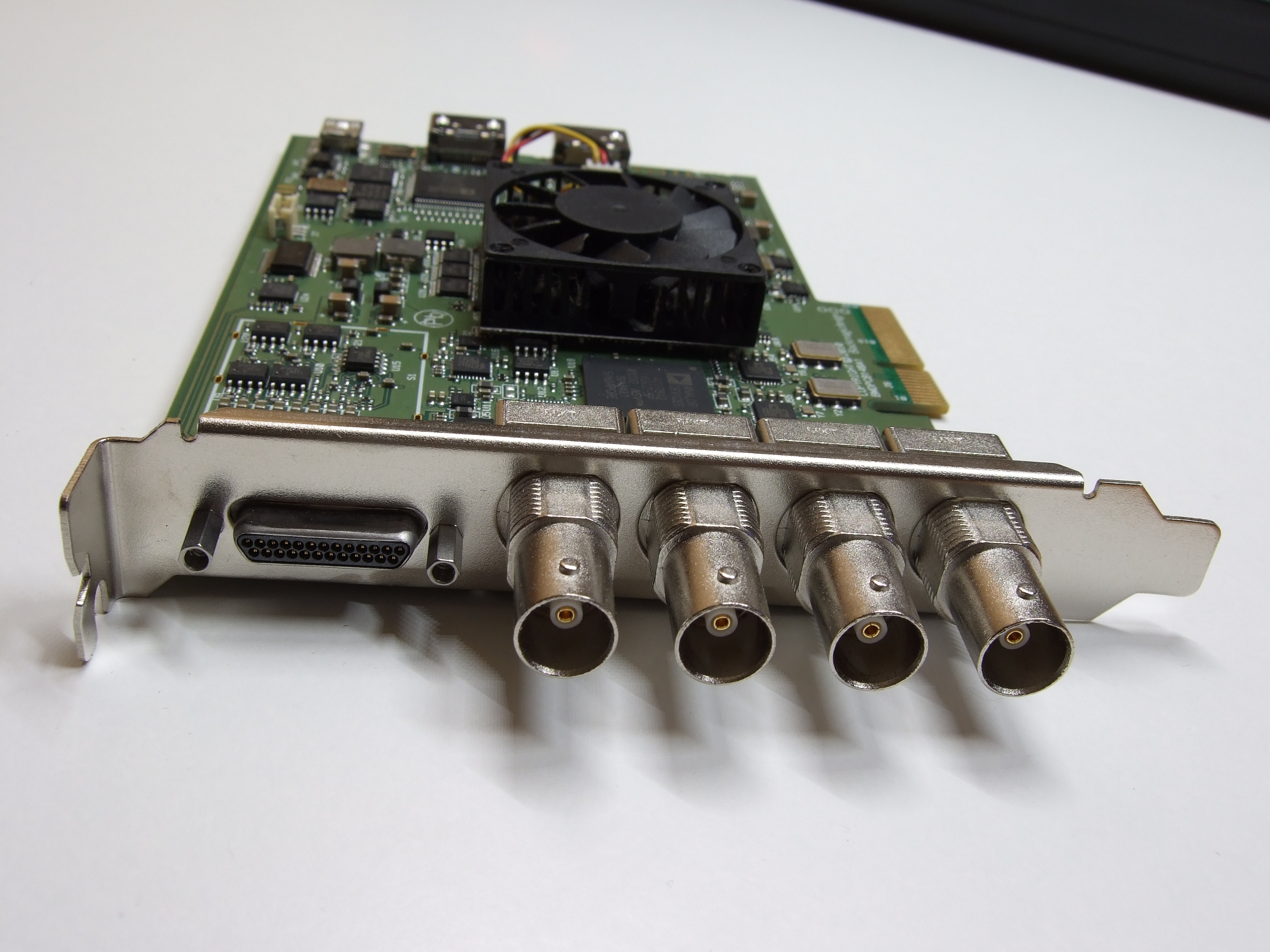
DeckLink HD Extreme 3D dual link 3 Gb/s SDI video capture card for PCIe

Editing, Color Correction and Audio Post Production

- DaVinci Resolve (free version) and DaVinci Resolve Studio (paid version), computer software for non-linear video editing, color correction, color grading, visual effects, and audio post-production.
- Audio/Video Controller Consoles: Editor Keyboard, Speed Editor, DaVinci Resolve Replay Editor, Micro Panel, Mini Panel, DaVinci Resolve Micro Color Panel, Advanced Panel, Fairlight Console Channel Fader, Fairlight Console Channel Control, Fairlight Console LCD Monitor, Fairlight Console Audio Editor, Fairlight Desktop Audio Editor, Fairlight Desktop Console, Fairlight Audio Interface
- Cintel Film Scanner (Generations 1-3)

Live Production

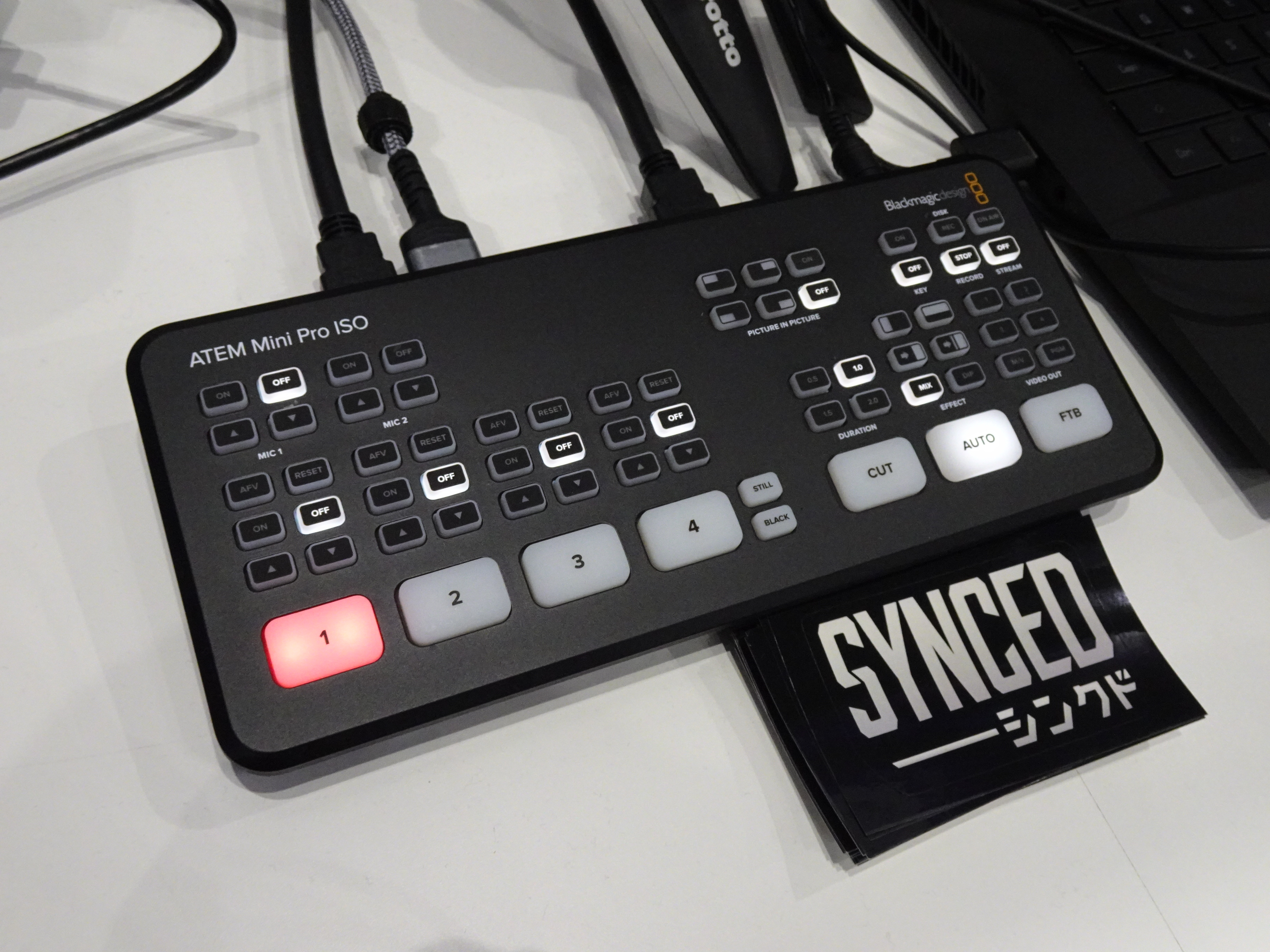
ATEM Mini Pro ISO

- Home Streaming: ATEM Mini, ATEM Mini Pro/ISO, ATEM Mini Extreme, ATEM Mini Extreme ISO (The ATEM Mini series has both HDMI and SDI variants)
- Production Switchers: ATEM 1,2 & 4 M/E Constellation HD, ATEM 1,2 & 4 M/E Constellation 4K, ATEM Constellation 8K, ATEM 1,2 & 4 M/E Production Studio 4K, ATEM Television Studio HD8 & HD8 ISO
- Switcher & Camera Controllers: ATEM Camera Control Panel, ATEM 1 M/E Advanced Panel, ATEM 2 M/E Advanced Panel, ATEM 4 M/E Advanced Panel
- Chroma Keyers: Ultimatte 12 HD Mini, Ultimatte 12 HD, Ultimatte 12 4K, Ultimatte 12 8K
- Recording and Storage: HyperDeck Studio HD Mini, HyperDeck Studio HD Plus, HyperDeck Studio HD Plus, HyperDeck Studio 4K Pro, HyperDeck Extreme 8K HDR, HyperDeck Extreme 4K HDR, HyperDeck Extreme Control, HyperDeck Shuttle HD, Duplicator 4K, MultiDock 10G, Video Assist 7" 12G HDR, Video Assist 5" 12G HDR

Capture and Playback

- UltraStudio: 3G, HD Mini, 4K Mini, 4K Extreme 3
- DeckLink (PCIe cards): Mini Recorder, Mini Monitor, Mini Monitor 4K, Mini Recorder 4K, Duo 2 Mini, Duo 2, Quad 2, SDI 4K, Studio 4K, 4K Extreme 12G, 8K Pro, Quad HDMI Recorder

Network Storage

- Cloud Store
- Cloud Pod

Broadcast Converters

- Micro Converter: BiDirectional SDI/HDMI 3G wPSU, HDMI to SDI 3G wPSU, SDI to HDMI 3G wPSU, BiDirectional SDI/HDMI 3G, HDMI to SDI 3G, SDI to HDMI 3G
- Mini Converters: Audio to SDI, Optical Fiber 12G, SDI Multiplex 4K, Quad SDI to HDMI 4K, SDI Distribution 4K, SDI to Analog 4K, Audio to SDI 4K, SDI to Audio 4K, HDMI to SDI 6G, SDI to HDMI 6G
- Teranex Mini: SDI Distribution 12G, SDI to HDMI 12G, Audio to SDI 12G, SDI to Analog 12G, SDI to HDMI 8K HDR, SDI to DisplayPort 8K HDR
- 2110 IP Converters

Routing and Distribution

- Videohub

== See also ==
- DaVinci Resolve
- Digital cinema
- History of film technology
- List of digital camera brands
