= CN-E 85mm T1.3 L F =

The Canon CN-E 85mm T1.3 L F is a professional L series lens designed for use in video recording using both full frame DSLRs and the mirrorless Canon Cinema EOS camera system. The lens can also fit on smaller crop sensor cameras.

The lens is constructed with a metal body and mount, and plastic extremities, like the Canon 85mm f/1.2 L. A circular, 11-blade diaphragm. A maximum aperture of 1.3 allows a shallow depth of field and large bokeh.

This lens has a well marked 300˚s of barrel rotation. The lens was designed concurrently with the CN-E 24mm T1.5 L F and CN-E 50mm T1.3 L F sharing hood diameter and other physical measurements. This allows for adaptation between different studio set equipment.

== Criticisms ==
The Canon CN-E 85mm T1.3 L F has been criticized for being over priced compared to typical prime photography lenses. The quality of the bokeh at maximum aperture is almost indistinguishable from lenses one half to one fourth the cost.
