= Canon EOS C300 =

2011 Super-35 digital cinema camera

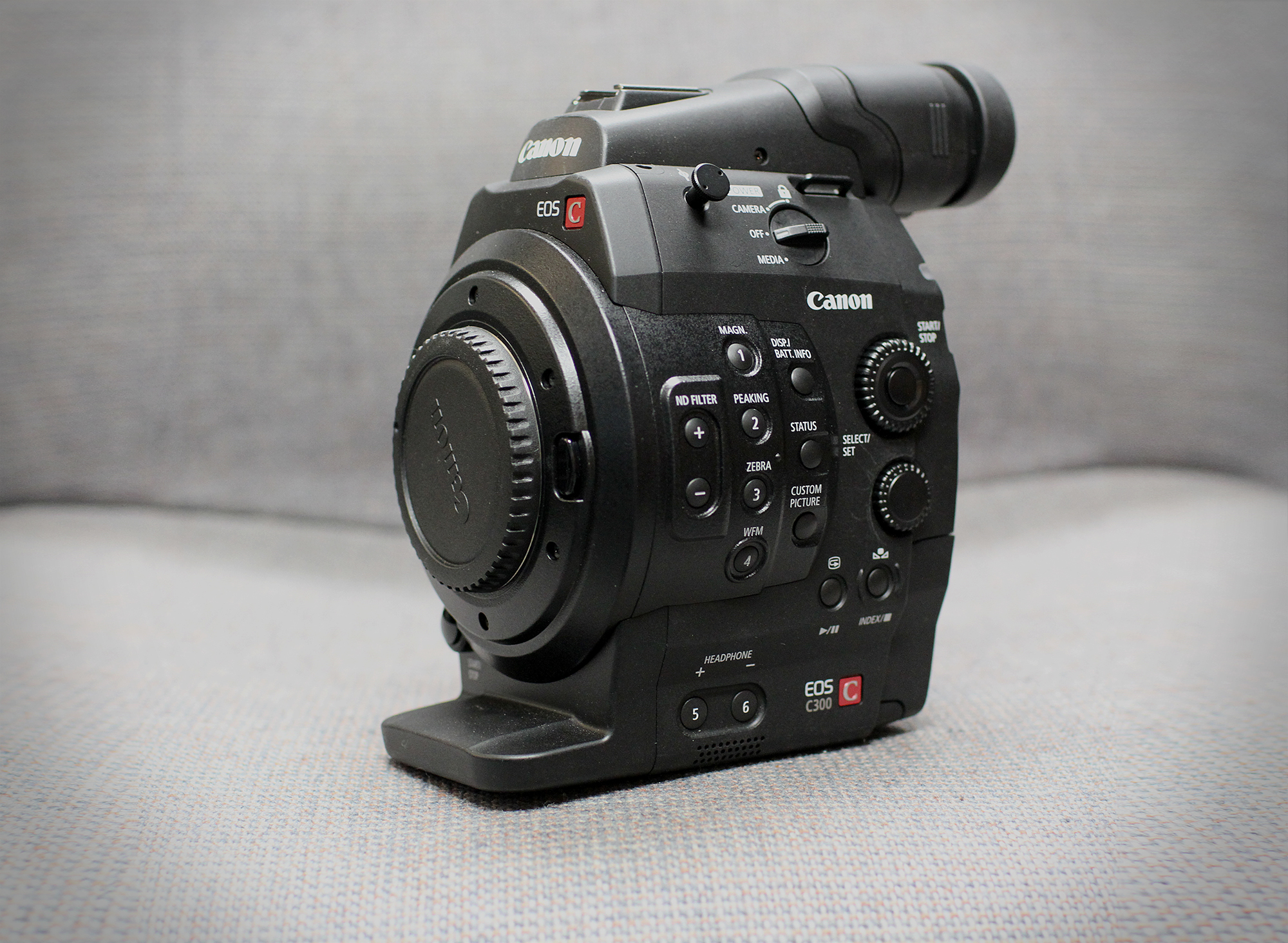
- A Canon EOS C300

Overview
- Maker: Canon Inc.
- Type: Digital cinema camera

Lens
- Lens mount: EF/PL

Sensor/medium
- Sensor type: CMOS
- Sensor size: 24.6 x 13.8 mm
- Maximum resolution: 1920 X 1080
- Storage media: CompactFlash (CF) (Type I or Type II)

Shutter
- Frame rate: 1-30fps (1080p); 1-60fps (720p)
- Image processor: DIGIC DV 3

General
- Battery: Canon BP-955 (included); Canon BP-975 (optional)
- AV port(s): HD/SD-SDI; HDMI; 3.5mm stereo headphone monitor XLR (2 channel); 3.5mm mic jack Timecode in/out Genlock; Sync out (3D)
- Weight: 3.2lbs/1.45kg (EF mount); 3.6lbs/1.63kg (PL mount)
- Made in: Japan

The EOS C300 is a digital cinema camera in the Cinema EOS range. It was announced by Canon on November 3, 2011.

The camera is offered with the option of Canon EF or Arri PL mounts. It has been available since January 2012.

In September 2015, Canon released an updated version, the Canon EOS C300 Mark II.

== Specifications ==
In 2011, the Canon EOS C300 was originally announced with the following characteristics:

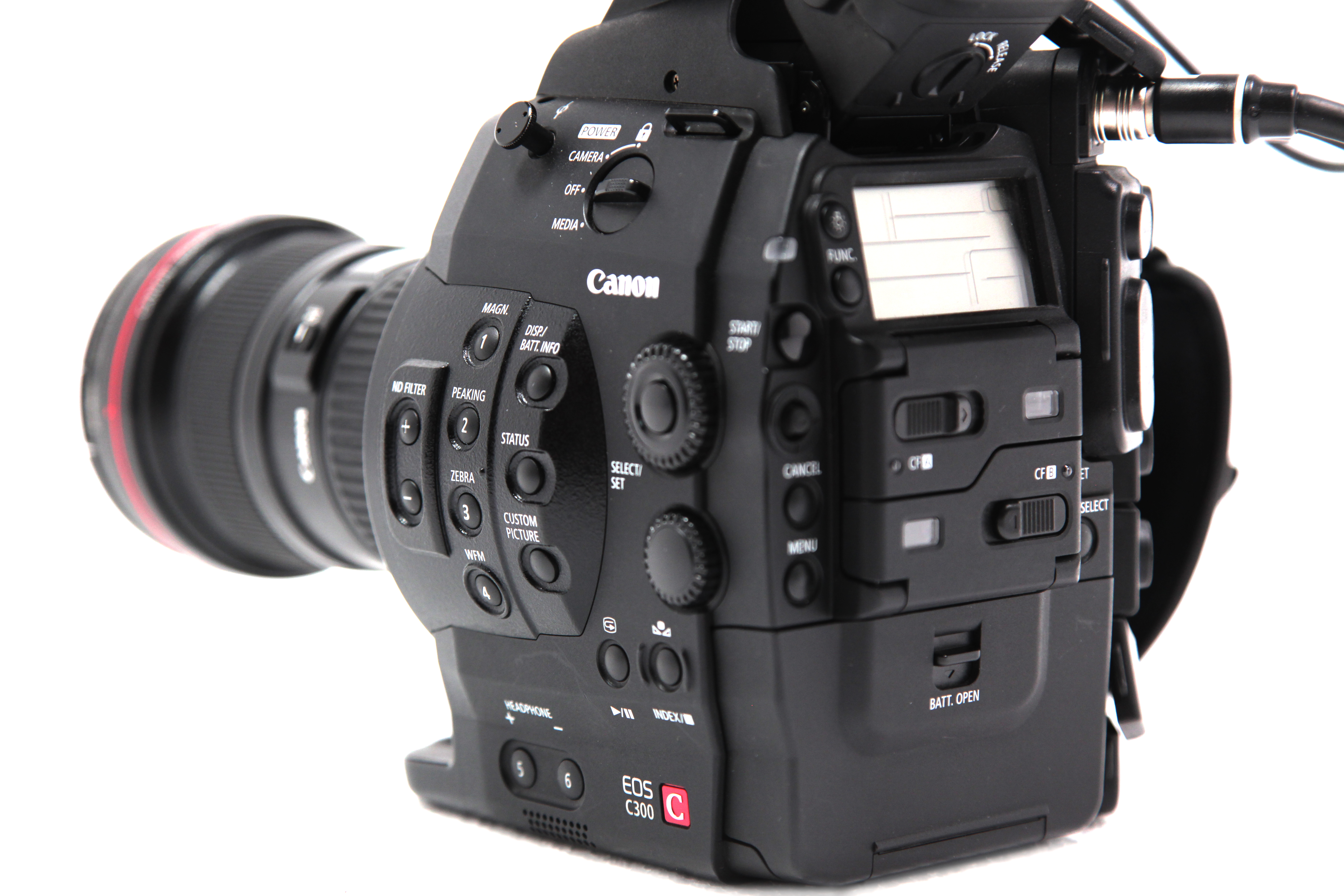
The back of the camera

- 8.3mp 3840x2160 Super-35 CMOS sensor (QFHD resolution)
- DIGIC DV III Processor
- Canon XF Codec
- Dual Compact Flash Slots
- Exposure and focus are both manual only
- Uses existing BP-955 and BP-975 batteries
- Sold as a system, including LCD monitor / XLR audio unit, side grip, and top handle.
- Availability: January 2012

== Price ==
The Canon EOS C300 was initially announced with a recommended retail price of $20,000 (body only) but was soon available for $16,000.

The price has dropped to approximately $1,000 in 2024 used.

== Sample footage ==
Vincent Laforet was given access to a pre-release version of the EOS C300 to shoot the short film Möbius (2011).

In addition, the C300 was used along with Canon EOS DSLRs (such as an infrared-modified Canon EOS 5D Mark II) on the short film When You Find Me (2011), directed by Bryce Dallas Howard and produced by her father Ron Howard.

A Canon EOS C300 was used with a drone to shoot aerial footage on the "small-budget" Kevin Macdonald film How I Live Now (2013).

The 2013 feature films Blue Ruin, Blue Is the Warmest Colour, and Victoria were shot exclusively on a C300.

== See also ==
- Canon
- Canon EOS

	2012	2013	2014	2015	2016	2017	2018	2019	2020	2021	2022	2023	2024	2025	2026
Standard							C700 FF								
Standard						C700									
Standard		C500							C500 MK II						
Standard														C400	
Standard	C300				C300 Mk II						C300 Mk III				
Standard							C200								
Standard														C80	
Standard		C100		C100 Mk II						C70					
MILC											R5C				
MILC															R6 V
DSLR		1D C													
