= Optical format =

Optical format is a hypothetical measurement approximately 50% larger than the true diagonal size of a solid-state photo sensor. The use of the optical format means that a lens used with a particular size sensor will have approximately the same angle of view as if it were to be used with an equivalent-sized video camera tube (an "old-fashioned" TV camera). In a video camera tube, the diagonal of the actual light-sensitive target was about two-thirds the outside diameter, which was the measure used.

The optical format is approximately the diagonal length of the sensor multiplied by 3/2. The result is expressed in inches and is usually (but not always) rounded to a convenient fraction. For instance, a 6.4x4.8 mm sensor has a diagonal of 8.0 mm and therefore an optical format of 8.0*3/2 = 12 mm, which is expressed as 1/2 inch in imperial units. The reason it is expressed in inches is historical, dating back to the early days of television.

Many image device sheets do not list the actual optical format but do list the size of their pixels in terms of micrometers; a helpful equation can be used to convert the pixel size and array size directly to optical format. The equation for this is:

$$OF = \frac {p \sqrt {w^2+h^2}} {16000}$$

with:

- w = width of array (in pixels)
- h = height of array (in pixels)
- p = pixel size (micrometers)

== See also ==
- Image sensor format
