= Canon Cinema EOS =

Type of digital camera

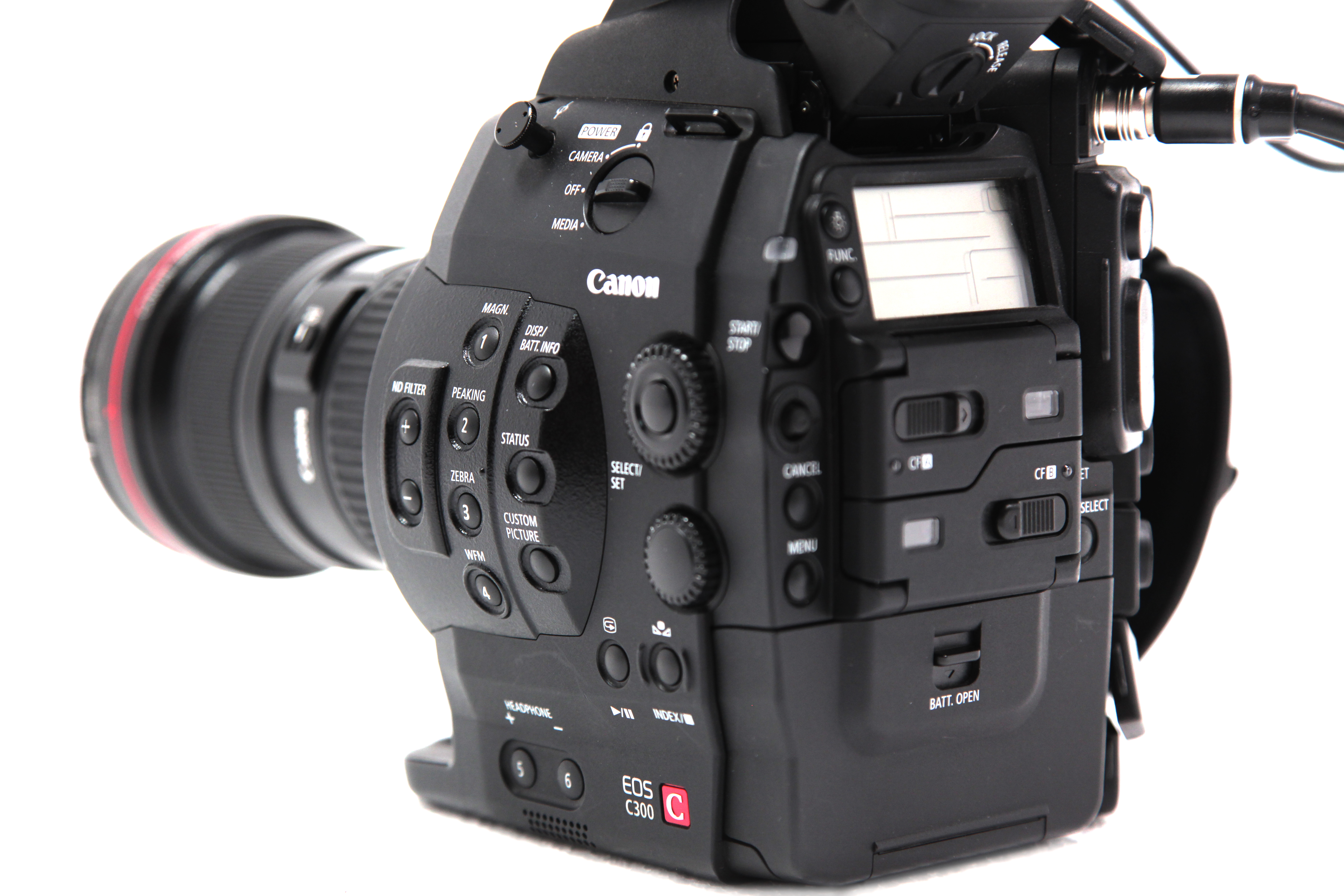
Canon EOS C300, first model of the lineup

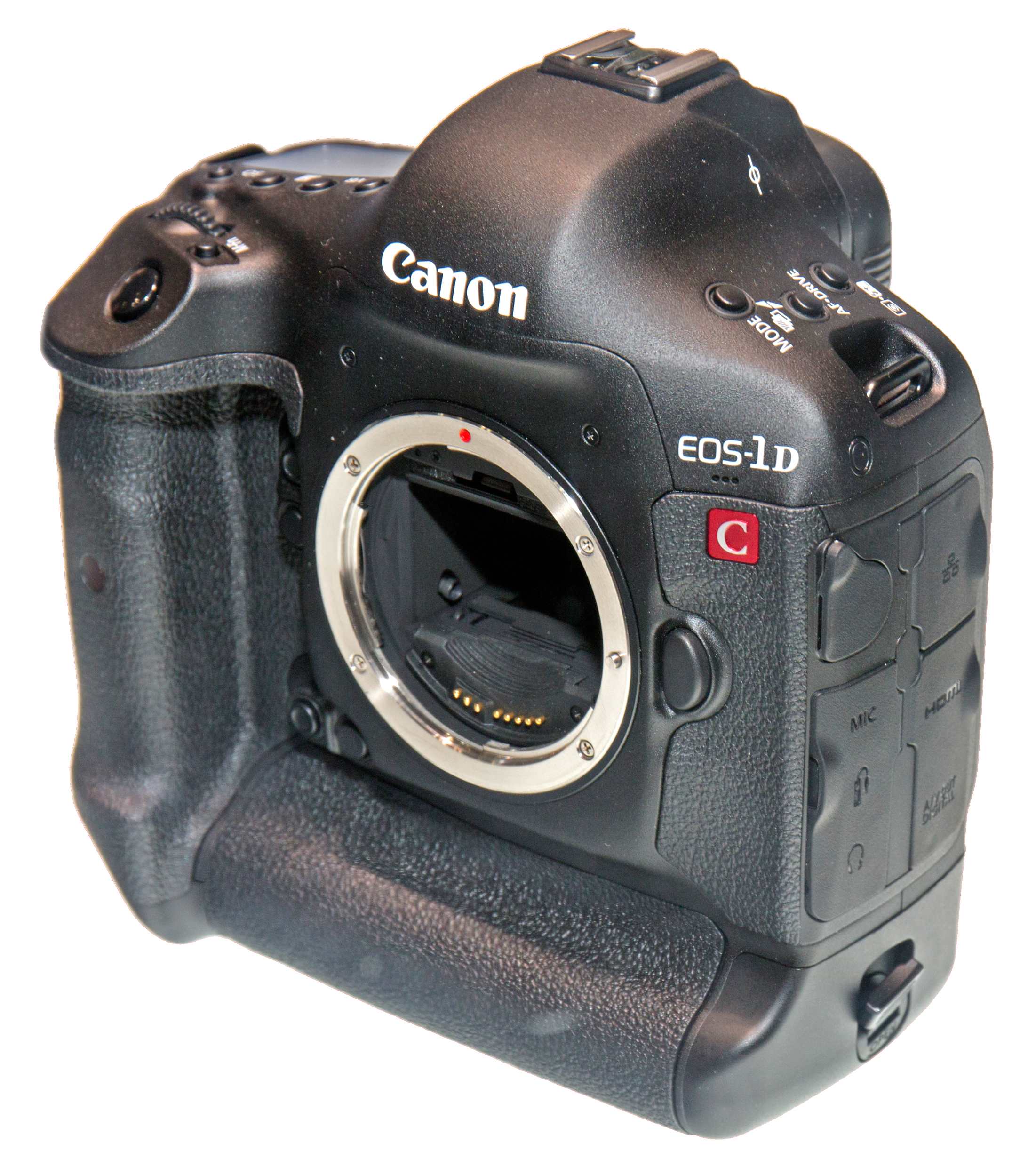
Canon EOS 1D C

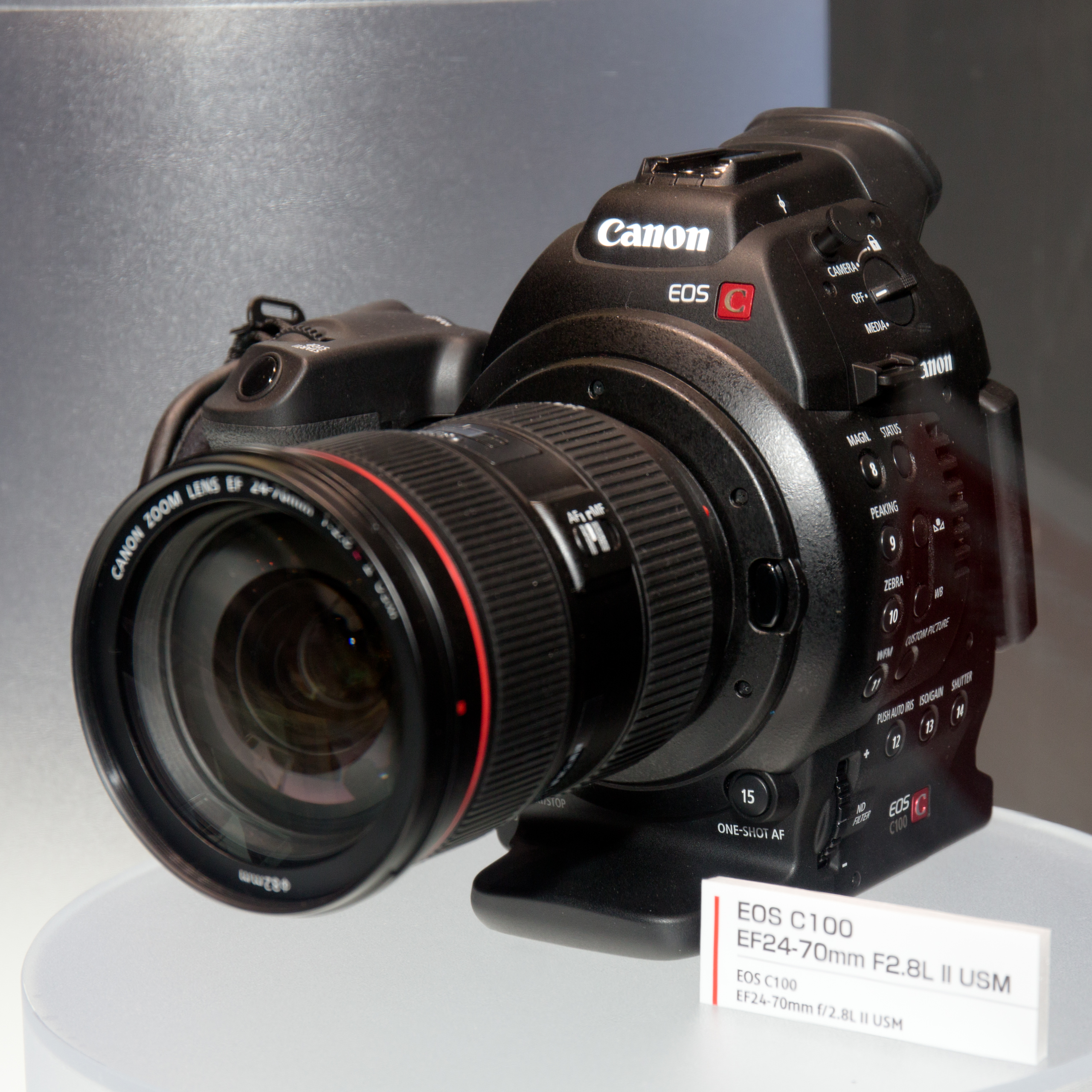
Canon EOS C100

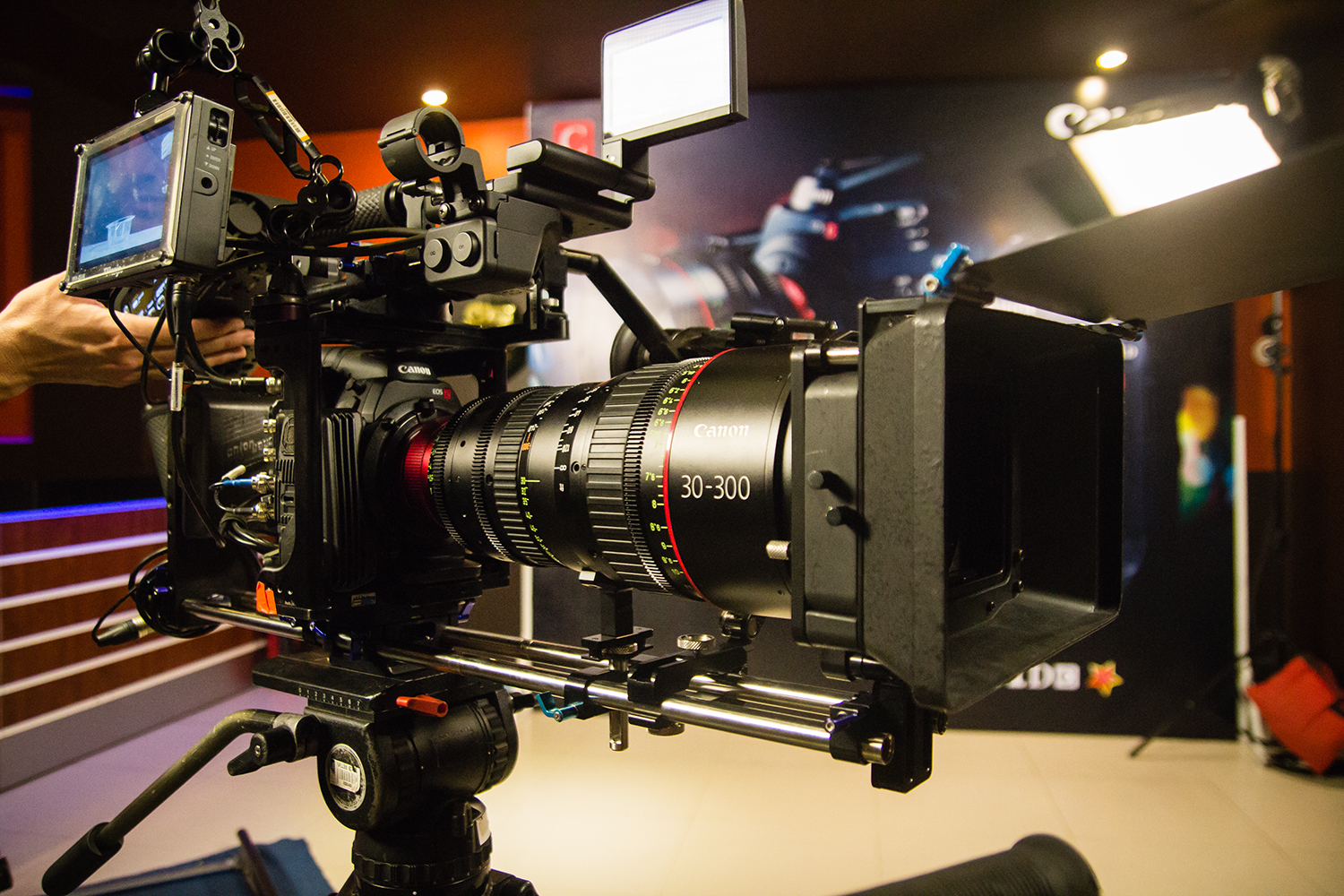
Canon EOS C500

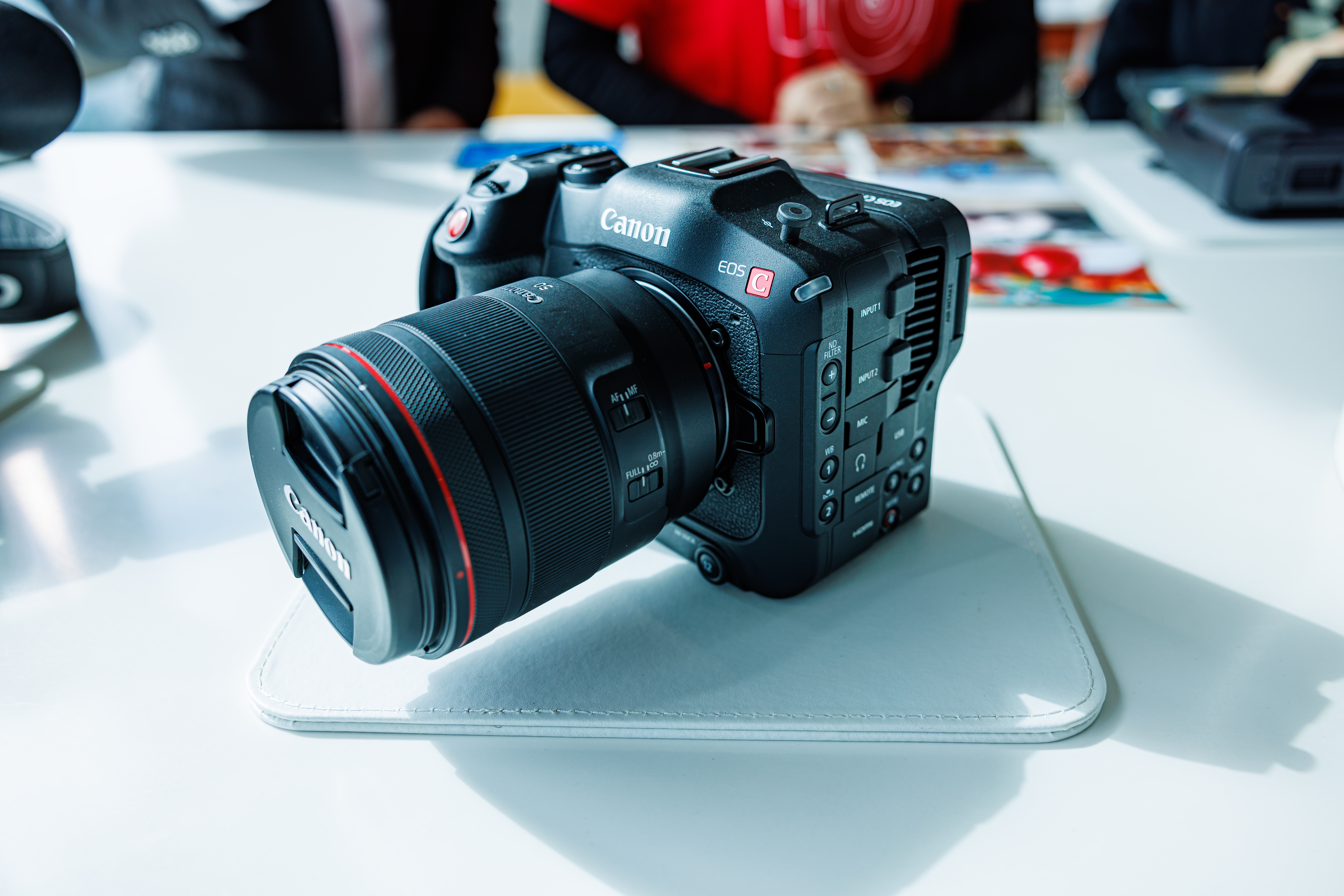
Canon EOS C70

The Canon Cinema EOS (Cinema Electro-Optical System) autofocus digital photographic and cinematographic SLR and mirrorless interchangeable lens camera system was introduced in late 2011 with the Canon EOS C300 and followed by the Canon EOS C500 and Canon EOS 1D C in early 2012.

== History ==
Cinema EOS is a branch-off from the existing EOS line of cameras that dates back to 1987 with the introduction of the analog Canon EOS 650. With many Canon DSLRs adding motion video capabilities, starting with the Canon EOS 5D Mark II in 2008, Canon decided to focus on making cameras specially designed for motion video instead of just producing still video cameras with some motion video capabilities.

The Cinema EOS line launched in late 2011, with a multi-day gala event held at Paramount Studios. Director Martin Scorsese spoke, and four films (directed by Sam Nicholson, ASC; Vincent LaForet, Richard Crudo, ASC and Felix Alcala ASC/Larry Carroll) shot with the new Canon C300MkI as well as accompanying Behind the Scenes films were presented. Products introduced included the C300 and new CN-E lenses (with both Canon EF and Arri PL mounts).

In early 2012, Canon began to expand the Cinema EOS line with the C500, which added 4K/QHD recording and RAW capture to the existing features of the C300. The new C500 would be the first camera to offer uncompressed raw motion video recording.

Canon also announced a variant of the Canon EOS-1D X, called the Canon EOS-1D C, which featured 4K (but not raw) recording on the same sensor. The new split in the Canon EOS 1D series follows its recent reunification of the high-resolution line (1D S) and high-speed line (1D) in 2011.

Additional announcements included an upcoming Canon camera that would feature 4K motion video capabilities in a DSLR body. The demonstration of a prototype device from Canon was a rarity and was seen as a sign of their intent to enter the new still and motion camera market.

In 2019 Canon released the Canon EOS C500 Mark II, a revision of the previous C500 model. This upgraded version included a Full Frame 5.9K sensor (the same sensor as the larger C700 FF camera), and allowed raw recording onto CFexpress type B cards. The camera featured a higher dynamic range with a claimed 15+ stops. The camera also features a built in ND filter system.

In early 2020 Canon would release the Canon EOS C300 Mark III, a Super 35 4K camera which shares a similar body to the C500 Mark II. The camera allows raw recording to CFexpress type B cards, and features a dual gain output sensor, allowing for a claimed dynamic range of 16+ stops. The camera also features a built in ND filter system.

In late 2020 Canon released the C70, a camera bridging DSLR video shooters with cinema camera users. It includes some of the features of the larger C300 Mark III (which shares the same sensor) in a smaller body that is more appealing to indie filmmakers. The camera uses Canon's latest lens mount, RF. The RF mount features a shorter flange depth allowing lenses from other mounts (like the more common cine lens mounts like PL or EF) to be easily adapted to it. It has features like a dedicated timecode port, user assignable buttons, built in ND filters, an array of audio ports, and Canon's full suite of monitoring tools.

In 2022 Canon released the R5 C, a cinema version of their R5 mirrorless stills camera. It is a full frame camera with an RF mount, and allows for 8K internal raw recording.

== Cameras ==
- 2011 - Canon EOS C300 - HD MPEG recording
- 2012 - Canon EOS 1D C - 4K/QHD and 2K/HD MJPEG
- 2012 - Canon EOS C100 - HD AVC recording
- 2012 - Canon EOS C500 - 4K/QHD and 2K/HD RAW recording (externally)
- 2014 - Canon EOS C100 Mark II - HD recording, improved auto focus.
- 2015 - Canon EOS C300 Mark II - 12-bit 2K/HD, 4K/UHD
- 2016 - Canon EOS C700 - 4.5K CMOS sensor
- 2017 - Canon EOS C200 - Internal 4K 12 bit RAW
- 2018 - Canon EOS C700 FF, 5.9K full frame sensor, 4K/UHD
- 2019 - Canon EOS C500 Mark II - 5.9K full frame sensor, 4K/UHD
- 2020 - Canon EOS C300 Mark III - 4K/UHD
- 2020 - Canon EOS C70 - 4K/UHD up to 120FPS, 4:2:2 10 bit, Internal 12 bit Raw
- 2022 - Canon EOS R5 C - DCI 8K full frame RAW
- 2024 - Canon EOS C400 - 6K full frame RAW
- 2024 - Canon EOS C80 - 6K full frame, compressed RAW
- 2025 - Canon EOS C50 - 7K full frame, compressed RAW

== Comparison table ==
Camera	Year introduced	Sensor size	Maximum resolution	Lens mount	Recording media	Recording codecs	Internal ND filters	Battery type	Native ISO	Video output ports	Audio inputs	Frame rates supported	Anamorphic desqueeze
C300	2011	24.6 × 13.8 mm	1920 × 1080	EF, PL	CompactFlash, HDMI/HD-SDI recorder	8-bit 4:2:2 MPEG2 (internal recording), uncompressed signal (HDMI/HD-SDI recorders)	ND 0.6, 1.2, 1.8	BP-900 series	850	3G-SDI, HDMI	2× XLR, 3.5 mm mini-jack	Up to 60 fps	None
1D C	2012	36 × 24 mm	4096 × 2160	EF	CompactFlash	8-bit 4:2:2 Motion JPEG, 8-bit 4:2:0 AVC	None	LP-E series	320	Mini HDMI	3.5 mm mini-jack	24 fps (4K), up to 60 fps (1080p)	None
C100	2012	24.6 × 13.8 mm	1920 × 1080	EF	SD, HDMI recorder	8-bit 4:2:0 AVC (internal recording), uncompressed 4:2:2 signal (HDMI recorders)	ND 0.6, 1.2, 1.8	BP-900 series	850	HDMI	2× XLR (on removable handle), 3.5 mm mini-jack	Up to 60i	None
C500	2012	26.2 × 13.8 mm	4096 × 2160 (external RAW) 1920 × 1080 (internal recording)	EF, PL	CompactFlash, HDMI/HD-SDI recorder	8-bit 4:2:2 MPEG2 (internal recording), uncompressed signal (HDMI/HD-SDI recorders)	ND 0.6, 1.2, 1.8	BP-900 series	850	3G-SDI, HDMI	2× XLR, 3.5 mm mini-jack	Up to 60 fps	None
C100 Mark II	2014	24.6 × 13.8 mm	1920 × 1080	EF	SD, HDMI recorder	8-bit 4:2:0 AVC (internal recording), uncompressed 4:2:2 signal (HDMI recorders)	ND 0.6, 1.2, 1.8	BP-900 series	850	HDMI	2× XLR (on removable handle), 3.5 mm mini-jack	Up to 60 fps	None
C300 Mark II	2015	24.6 × 13.8 mm	4096 × 2160	EF, PL (interchangeable by Canon)	CFast 2.0, SD, HDMI/HD-SDI recorder	10-bit 4:2:2 MPEG2 (4K internal recording), 12-bit 4:4:4 MPEG2 (2K internal recording), uncompressed 4K 12-bit signal (HDMI recorders) or 2K signal (HD-SDI recorders)	ND 0.6, 1.2, 1.8, 2.4, 3.0	BP-A series	800	3G-SDI, HDMI	2× XLR, 3.5 mm mini-jack	Up to 30 fps (4K), 120 fps (2K/HD)	None
C700	2016	26.2 × 13.8 mm	4512 × 2376 (external RAW) 4096 × 2160 (internal)	EF, PL (interchangeable by Canon)	CFast 2.0, SD, Codex recorder	12-bit 4444 ProRes, 12-bit 4:4:4 XF-AVC (to CFast 2.0 card), 8-bit XF-AVC (SD card), 12-bit RAW (to external recorders)	ND 0.6, 1.2, 1.8, 2.4, 3.0	BP-A series	800	12G-SDI, 3G-SDI, HDMI	2× XLR, 3.5 mm mini-jack	Up to 60 fps (4K), 120 fps (2K), 240 fps (HD)	1.3x and 2x
C200	2017	24.6 × 13.8 mm	4096 × 2160 (RAW) 3840 × 2160 (MPEG4/AVC)	EF, PL (interchangeable by Canon)	CFast 2.0, SD	12-bit Cinema RAW Light (to CFast card), 8-bit 4:2:0 MPEG4/AVC (to SD card, uncompressed 4K 12-bit signal (HDMI recorders) or 2K signal (HD-SDI recorders)	ND 0.6, 1.2, 1.8, 2.4, 3.0	BP-A series	800	3G-SDI, HDMI	2× XLR, 3.5 mm mini-jack	Up to 60 fps (4K), 120 fps (HD)	None
C700 FF	2018	38.1 × 20.1 mm	5952 × 3140 (external RAW), 4096 × 2160 (internal)	EF, PL (interchangeable by Canon)	CFast 2.0, SD, external recorder	ProRes, XF-AVC (to CFast 2.0), proxy files (to SD), Cinema RAW (to external recorder)	ND 0.6, 1.2, 1.8, 2.4, 3.0	BP-A series	800	12G-SDI, 3G-SDI, HDMI	2× XLR, 3.5 mm mini-jack	Up to 60 fps (5.9K), 120 fps (4K), 240 fps (2K)	2×, 1.3×
C500 Mark II	2019	38.1 × 20.1 mm	5952 × 3140 (RAW) 4096 × 2160 (AVC)	EF, PL (interchangeable)	CFexpress Type B, SD, HDMI/HD-SDI recorder	12-bit Cinema RAW Light, 10-bit 4:2:2 AVC, uncompressed 4K 12-bit signal (HD-SDI recorders)	ND 0.6, 1.2, 1.8, 2.4, 3.0	BP-A series	800	12G-SDI, 3G-SDI, HDMI	2× XLR, 3.5 mm mini-jack	Up to 60 fps (5.9K), 60 fps (4K), 120 fps (2K)	2×, 1.8×, 1.3×
C300 Mark III	2020	26.2 × 13.8 mm	4096 × 2160 (RAW) 3840 × 2160 (MPEG2)	EF, PL (interchangeable)	CFexpress Type B, SD, HDMI/HD-SDI recorder	12-bit Cinema RAW Light, 10-bit 4:2:2 MPEG2, uncompressed 4K 12-bit signal (HDMI/HD-SDI recorders)	ND 0.6, 1.2, 1.8, 2.4, 3.0	BP-A series	800	12G-SDI, 3G-SDI, HDMI	2× XLR, 3.5 mm mini-jack	Up to 120 fps (4K), 180 fps (2K)	2×, 1.8×, 1.3×
C70	2020	26.2 × 13.8 mm	4096 × 2160 (RAW) 3840 × 2160 (XF-AVC)	RF, EF and PL via adapters	SD	12-bit Cinema RAW Light, XF-AVC	ND 0.6, 1.2, 1.8, 2.4, 3.0	BP-A series	800	HDMI	2× mini XLR, 3.5 mm mini-jack	Up to 120 fps (4K), 180 fps (2K)	None
R5 C	2022	36 × 24 mm	8192 × 4320 (RAW) 4096 × 2160 (XF-AVC/HEVC)	RF, EF and PL via adapters	CFexpress Type B, SD	12-bit Cinema RAW Light (to CFexpress), XF-AVC, HEVC (to SD)	None	LP-E series	800, 3200	Micro HDMI	3.5 mm mini-jack	Up to 60 fps (8K RAW), 120 fps (4K)	2×, 1.8×, 1.3×
C400	2024	38.4 × 20.2 mm	6000 × 3164 (RAW) 4096 × 2160 (AVC/HEVC)	RF, EF and PL via adapters	CFexpress Type B, SD	10-bit 4:2:2 XF-AVC, XF-AVC S, and XF-HEVC S (to SD card) 12-bit Cinema RAW Light (to CFexpress)	ND 0.6, 1.2, 1.8, 2.4, 3.0	BP-A series	800, 3200, 12800	12G-SDI, HDMI	2× mini XLR, 3.5 mm mini-jack	Up to 60 fps (6K), 120 fps (4K), 180 fps (2K)	2×, 1.8×, 1.5×, 1.3×
C80	2024	38.4 × 20.2 mm	6000 × 3164 (RAW) 4096 × 2160 (AVC/HEVC)	RF, EF and PL via adapters	SD	Cinema RAW Light (12-bit), XF-AVC, XF-AVC S, and XF-HEVC S	ND 0.6, 1.2, 1.8, 2.4	BP-A series	800, 3200, 12800	12G-SDI, HDMI	2× mini XLR, 3.5 mm mini-jack	Up to 30 fps (6K), 120 fps (4K), 180 fps (2K)	2×, 1.8×, 1.3×
C50	2025	35.9 × 23.9 mm	6960 × 4640 (RAW) 4096 × 2160 (AVC/HEVC)	RF, EF and PL via adapters	CFexpress Type B, SD	10-bit 4:2:2 XF-AVC, XF-AVC S, and XF-HEVC S (to SD card) 12-bit Cinema RAW Light (to CFexpress)	None	LP-E series	800, 6400	HDMI	2× XLR (on removable handle), 3.5 mm mini-jack	Up to 60 fps (7K), 120 fps (4K), 180 fps (cropped)	2×, 1.8×, 1.5×, 1.3×

== Lenses ==
Canon has released a series of cinema-specific lenses using the CN-E designation.

=== Nomenclature ===
- CN-E - Cinema EOS
- S - Super 35 mm
- F - Full 35 mm
- P - PL mount
- EF - EF mount
- L - (Luxury)

=== Full Frame ===
==== Prime lenses ====
===== RF mount =====
- CN-R14mm T3.1 L F (2023)
- CN-R20mm T1.5 L F (2023)
- CN-R24mm T1.5 L F (2023)
- CN-R35mm T1.5 L F (2023)
- CN-R50mm T1.3 L F (2023)
- CN-R85mm T1.3 L F (2023)
- CN-R135mm T2.2 L F (2023)

===== EF mount =====
- CN-E 14mm T3.1 L F (2013)
- CN-E 24mm T1.5 L F (2011)
- CN-E 35mm T1.5 L F (2015)
- CN-E 50mm T1.3 L F (2011)
- CN-E 85mm T1.3 L F (2011)
- CN-E135mm T2.2 L F (2013)

===== PL mount =====
- 14mm Sumire Prime T3.1 (2019)
- 20mm Sumire Prime T1.5 (2019)
- 24mm Sumire Prime T1.5 (2019)
- 35mm Sumire Prime T1.5 (2019)
- 50mm Sumire Prime T1.3 (2019)
- 85mm Sumire Prime T1.3 (2019)
- 135mm Sumire Prime T2.2 (2019)

==== Zoom lenses ====
===== EF and PL mount =====
- CN20x50 Cine-Servo 50-1000mm T5.0-8.9 (2014)
- CN10X25 Cine-Servo 25-250mm T2.95-3.9 (2020)
- CN-E 20-50mm T2.4 LF (2022)
- CN-E 45-135mm T2.4 LF (2022)
- CN8x15 IAS S E1/P1 Cine-Servo 15-120mm T2.95-3.95 (2022)

The CN20x50, CN10X25, and CN8x15 are primarily Super 35 lenses but have a built in 1.5X extender which allows them to cover Full Frame when in use

=== Super 35 mm ===
==== Zoom lenses ====
===== RF Mount =====
- CN7x17 KAS S Cine-Servo 17-120mm T2.95 (2024)

===== EF Mount =====
- CN-E 18-80mm T4.4 L IS (2016)
- CN-E 70-200mm T4.4 L IS (2017)

===== EF and PL Mount =====
- CN-E 14.5-60mm T2.6 L S P (2011)
- CN-E 30-300mm T2.95-3.7 L S P (2011)
- CN-E 15.5-47mm T2.8 L S P (2012)
- CN-E 30-105mm T2.8 L S P (2012)
- CN7x17 KAS S Cine-Servo 17-120mm T2.95 (2014)
- CN20x50 Cine-Servo 50-1000mm T5.0-8.9 (2014)
- CN10X25 Cine-Servo 25-250mm T2.95-3.9 (2020)
- CN8x15 IAS S E1/P1 Cine-Servo 15-120mm T2.95-3.95 (2022)
- CN-E Flex Zoom 14-35mm T1.7 (2023)
- CN-E Flex Zoom 31.5-95mm T1.7 (2023)

	2012	2013	2014	2015	2016	2017	2018	2019	2020	2021	2022	2023	2024	2025	2026
Standard							C700 FF								
Standard						C700									
Standard		C500							C500 MK II						
Standard														C400	
Standard	C300				C300 Mk II						C300 Mk III				
Standard							C200								
Standard														C80	
Standard		C100		C100 Mk II						C70					
MILC											R5C				
MILC															R6 V
DSLR		1D C													
