= Vincent Laforet =

- Born: 1975 (age 50–51); Switzerland
- Education: Dalton School
- Alma mater: Northwestern University
- Occupations: Director, Photographer
- Employer(s): Apple Inc, LAFORET VISUALS Inc.
- Known for: Reverie, Pulitzer Prize, Director, Filmmaker, Photographer, Mobius
- Spouse: Alanna
- Children: 5
- Website: Laforet Visuals

Vincent Laforet (born 1975, Switzerland) is a French-American director and photographer. Laforet shared the 2002 Pulitzer Prize for Feature Photography with four other photographers (Stephen Crowley, Chang Lee, James Hill, Ruth Fremson) as a member of The New York Times staff's coverage of the post 9/11 events overseas that captured "the pain and the perseverance of people enduring protracted conflict in Afghanistan and Pakistan." In 2006, Laforet became the Times' s first national contract photographer. He has been sent on assignment by Vanity Fair, The New York Times Magazine, National Geographic, Sports Illustrated, Time, Newsweek, and Life. He is represented by the Stockland Martel agency.

In 2002, PDN named Vincent Laforêt as one of the "30 photographers under 30 to watch″. In 2005, American Photo Magazine recognized Laforêt as one of the "100 Most Influential People in Photography." His work has been recognized in the Communication Arts Annual, PDN Annual, The SPD Magazine Cover of the Year (Society of Publication Designers), The World Press Photo Awards, The Pictures of the Year Competition, The Overseas Press Club, The National Headliners Awards, The Pro-Football Hall of Fame. Vincent is a Canon Explorer of Light and Canon Printmaster and serves as consultant toApple, Adobe, Carl Zeiss, Leica, Canon, Bogen, Lexar, and X-Rite. He and his work have been profiled on CNN and Good Morning America.

== Works ==
=== Reverie (2008) ===
In 2008, Laforet directed "Reverie", the first widely available short film shot with the Canon 5D Mark II camera. The video has been cited by proposers of the use of DSLR cameras in digital cinematography.

=== Beyond The Still (2010) ===
In 2010, he launched a nationwide film competition "Beyond The Still" and he directed the final chapter the film which was screened at the Sundance Film Festival. He is a DGA Director (Directors Guild of America) and of the ICG (International Cinematographers' Guild – Local 600.) He has directed a number of short films and numerous commercials.

=== Mobius (2011) ===
In 2011, he was chosen by Canon to be one of the first 4 filmmakers to shoot with their first cinema camera, the Canon C300, and he directed the film "Mobius" which premiered at Paramount Studios.

=== Visual Stories (2011) ===
In 2011, his first book VISUAL STORIES was released by Peachpit and describes his thought process and approach to a variety of assignments throughout his photography career.

== Background ==
Laforet has been awarded 3 of the Cannes Lions (Platinum, Gold, Silver) for his commercial directing work.

Laforet attended the Dalton School and received his B.S. from the Medill School of Journalism at Northwestern University in 1997. He is fluent in French and English, and speaks Russian and Spanish. He lives in Palos Verdes, California with his wife, Alanna, and his children.

Laforet was an adjunct professor at the Columbia Journalism's Graduate School of Journalism, The International Center of Photography and the Poynter Institute. He was inducted in Northwestern's Alumni Hall of Fame in 2010.

In the fall of 2020, Laforet joined Apple Inc, with a focus on photography, video and future technologies.
