= Cinema Camera =

Line of digital movie cameras

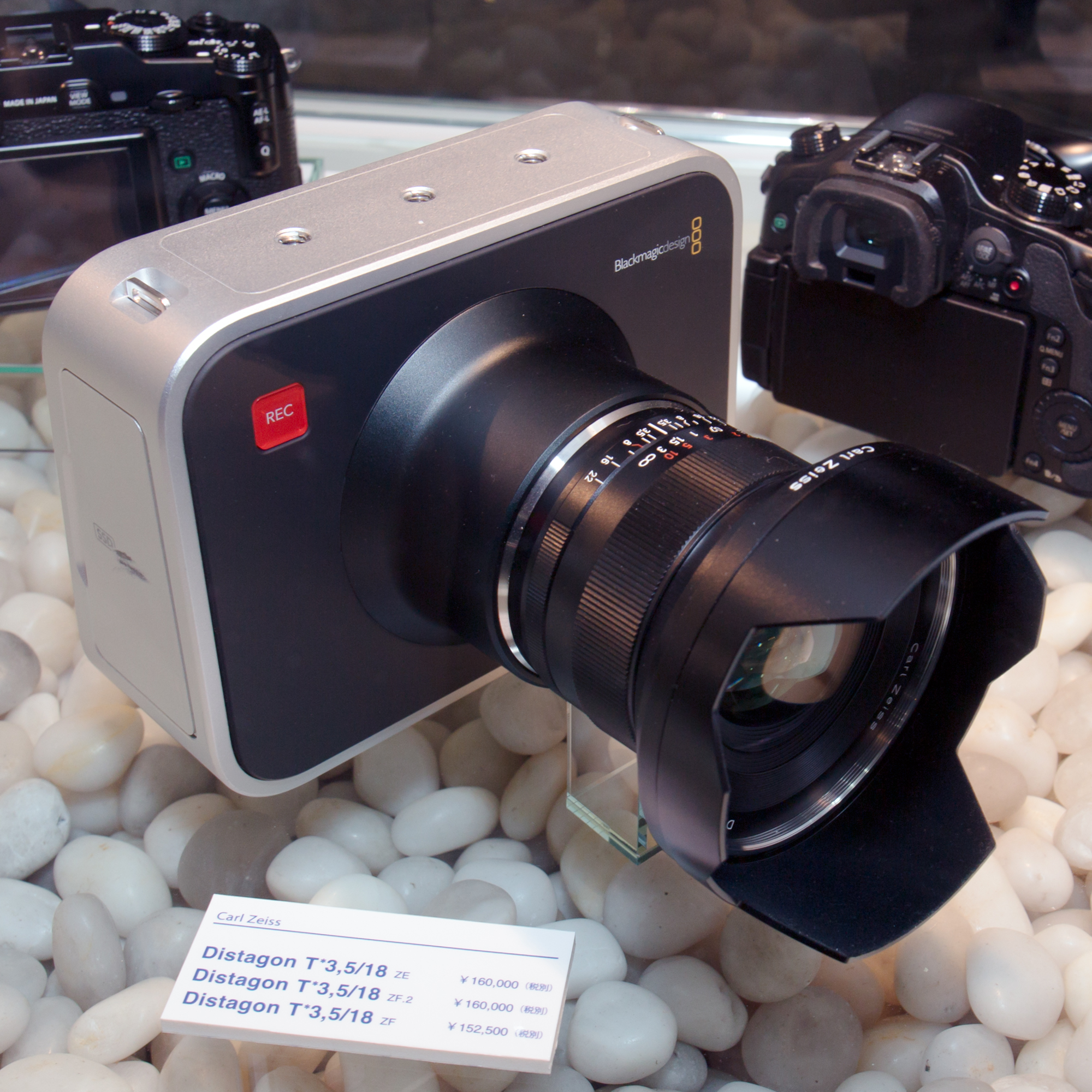
The Blackmagic Cinema Camera with a lens attached

The Cinema Camera is a line of digital movie cameras developed and manufactured by Blackmagic Design, introduced on September 4, 2012. They are a series of small form-factor cinema cameras that shoot in 6K, 4K, 2.5K, and 1080p resolution, making them more versatile when compared to standard-resolution digital movie cameras.

== Models ==
- Cinema Camera (2012)
- Pocket Cinema Camera (2013)
- Production Camera 4K (2014)
- Micro Cinema Camera (2016)
- Pocket Cinema Camera 4K (2018)
- Pocket Cinema Camera 6K (2018)
- Pocket Cinema Camera 6K Pro (2021)
- Pocket Cinema Camera 6K G2 (2022)
- Cinema Camera 6K (2023)

== Features ==
=== Formats ===
All cameras use at least the RAW, Blackmagic RAW (BRAW), CinemaDNG, Apple ProRes and/or Avid DNxHD codecs and formats in 8K, 6K, 4K, 2.5K or 1080p.

=== Software ===
All of the cameras require use of Blackmagic's proprietary Camera Utility software and need to be connected to a computer via USB to install the firmware. The software and firmware are obtained through Blackmagic's website.
