= Digital movie camera =

Digital motion picture camera used to shoot movies

A digital movie camera for digital cinematography is a motion picture camera that captures footage digitally rather than physical film, known as film stock. Different digital movie cameras output a variety of different acquisition formats. Cameras designed for domestic use have also been used for low-budget independent productions.

Since the 2000s, digital movie cameras have become the dominant type of camera in the motion picture industry, replacing movie cameras that shoot on film.

== Types ==
=== Professional cameras ===
There are a number of movie cameras on the market designed specifically for high-end digital cinematography use. These cameras typically offer relatively large sensors, selectable frame rates, recording options with low compression ratios or, in some cases, no compression, and the ability to use high-quality optics. Some of the cameras are expensive, and some are only available to rent.

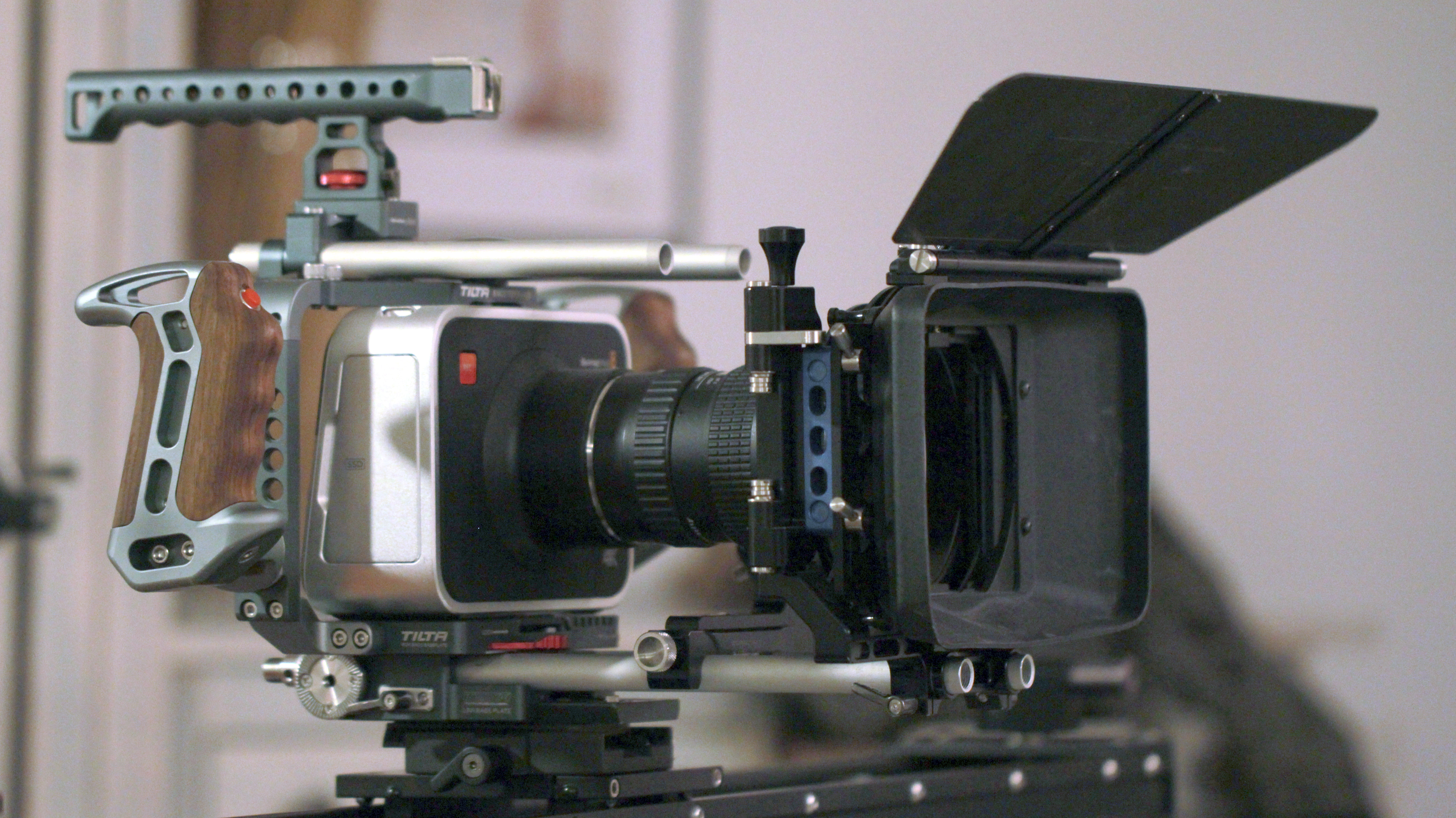
Blackmagic Production Camera 4K

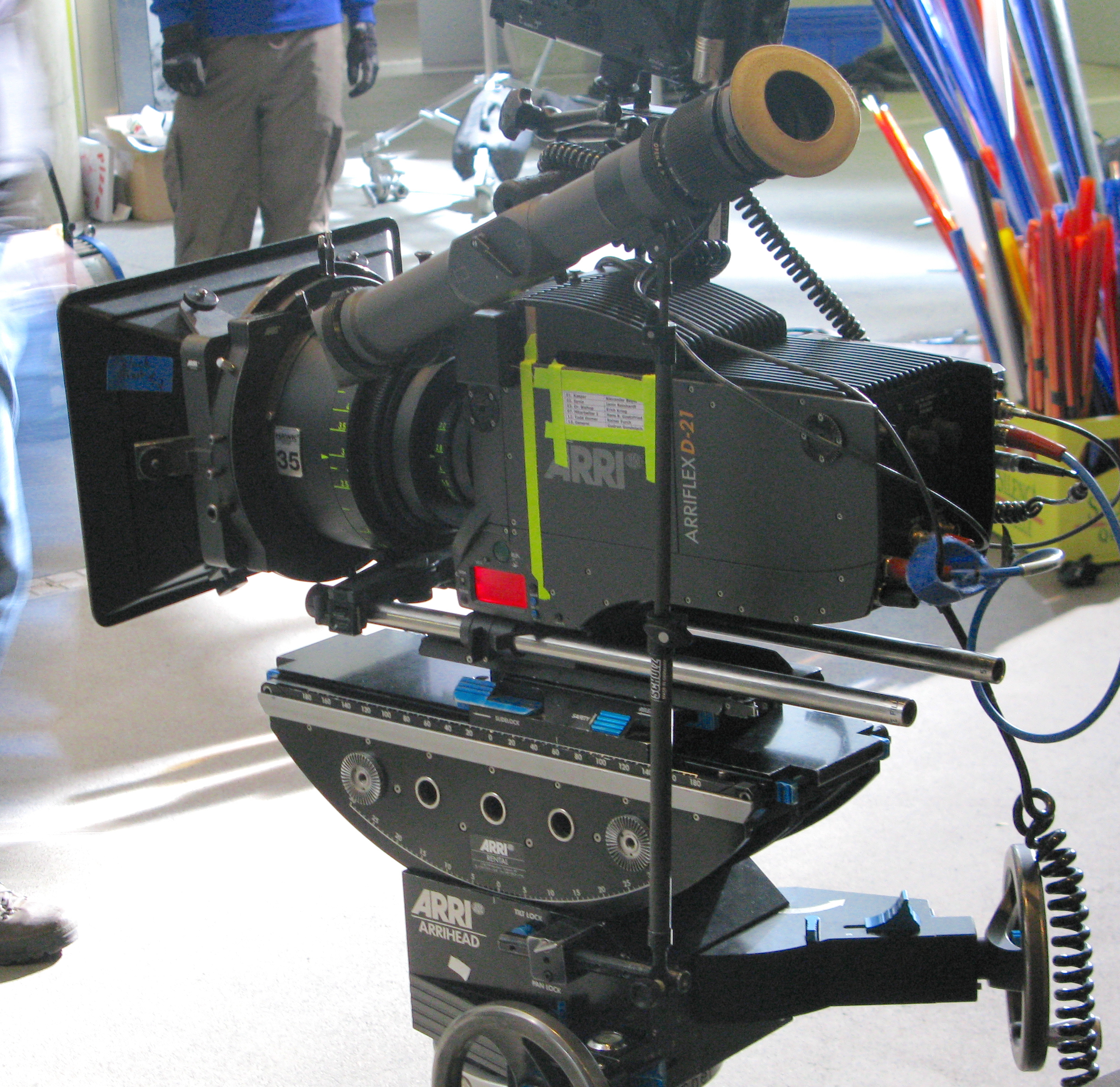
The digital movie camera Arriflex D-21 by Arri.

Some of the most used professional digital movie cameras include:

- Arri Alexa
- Blackmagic URSA
- Blackmagic Pocket Cinema Cameras
- Canon Cinema EOS
- Panavision Genesis
- Panavision Millennium Digital XL and XL2
- Panasonic VariCam
- Red DSMC System
- Sony CineAlta

=== Prosumer and consumer cameras ===
Independent movie-makers have also pressed low-cost consumer and hybrid prosumer cameras into service for digital cinematography. Though image quality is typically much lower than what can be produced with professional digital cinematography cameras, the technology has steadily improved, most significantly in the last several years with the arrival of high-definition cameras in this market. These inexpensive cameras are limited by their relatively high compression ratios, their small sensors, and the quality of their optics. Many also have integrated lenses which cannot be changed.

The Nikon D90 was the first DSLR with video recording capabilities; it could record 720p high-definition video with monaural sound. Soon after the D90's introduction, many new DSLRs from Nikon and other manufacturers began including video recording as a standard feature.

== Resolution ==
=== Standard definition ===
MiniDV was the predominant standard definition consumer video acquisition format in the early 2000s. Steven Soderbergh used the Canon XL-1s MiniDV camera while shooting Full Frontal. The Danny Boyle directed British horror film, 28 Days Later was also shot on MiniDV using the Canon XL-1, albeit with traditional Panavision 35mm film lenses. One of the first MiniDV cameras used on a feature film was the Sony VX-1000, which was used to shoot Spike Lee's Bamboozled.

In 2002, Panasonic released the AG-DVX100, which was the first affordable camcorder to support progressive scan at 24 frames per second on its 60Hz version, duplicating the motion characteristics of film and allowing for easier transfers to film.

=== High definition ===
Digital cinematography has been, by and large, done in high definition resolutions and above. The Sony HDW-F900 was the first mass market video camera that could shoot at 24p (or, rather, 24 PsF), and it could shoot in what was nominally full HD. HD has since become the standard for digital cinematography, and in the decades since it has become standard to shoot in resolutions even far exceeding full HD.

Sony, JVC and Canon brought high-definition video acquisition to the consumer and prosumer markets with the HDV format. HDV cameras sold with a wide range of capabilities. Many support progressive shooting modes, and some have sensors with full 1920x1080 resolution (though the HDV format itself can only record 1440x1080 in non-square pixels, and DVCPRO HD only records at 1280x1080 or 960x720). In addition, some Canon and JVC HDV camcorders have the ability to use high-quality interchangeable lenses, rather than the fixed lenses that are included with most prosumer cameras.

The Canon EOS 5D Mark II is a "full-frame" format HDSLR camera capable of recording 1080p video at 24, 25 or 30 frames per second, with a file size limit of 4 GB. Movie makers are pressing this camera into service as a low-cost way to shoot motion footage. The Canon EOS 7D is an APS-C HDSLR that was used to shoot the independent horror film Marianne and Sound of My Voice. Both cameras have been used together to shoot point-of-view (POV) action scenes in The Avengers due to the cameras being relatively cheap and small and, therefore, easily used to shoot different angles in tight locations.

== See also ==
- Digital cinematography
- Digital cinema
- List of films shot on digital video prior to 2012
