= S10 =

S10 may refer to:

== Automobiles ==
- Chevrolet S-10, a pickup truck
- Nissan Silvia (S10), a sports car
- Toyota Crown (S10), a luxury car

== Aviation ==
- Lake Chelan Airport, in Chelan County, Washington, United States
- Letov Š-10, a Czech trainer aircraft
- Rans S-10 Sakota, an American aerobatic aircraft
- Sikorsky S-10, a Russian seaplane
- SIPA S.10, a French trainer aircraft
- Stemme S10, a self-launching sailplane

== Electronics ==
- Canon HF S10, a camcorder
- Canon PowerShot S10, a digital camera
- Lenovo IdeaPad S10, a netbook
- Nikon Coolpix S10, a digital camera
- Roland S-10, a sampler keyboard
- Samsung Galaxy S10, a smartphone by Samsung
- Samsung Galaxy Tab S10, a tablet computer from Samsung
- Siemens S10, a Siemens Mobile phone

== Rail and transit ==
=== Lines ===
- S10 (Berlin), a former S-Bahn line in Germany
- S10 (St. Gallen S-Bahn), an S-Bahn line in Switzerland
- S10 (TILO), a railway service in Switzerland and Italy
- S10 (ZVV), a line of the Zurich S-Bahn in Switzerland
- S10, a Breisgau S-Bahn line in Germany

=== Locomotives ===
- ALCO S-10, a diesel-electric switcher
- Northern Pacific class S-10, a 4-6-0 locomotive class
- Oldenburg S 10, a 2-6-2 locomotive class
- Prussian S 10, a 4-6-0 locomotive class
- Sri Lanka Railways S10, a diesel multiple unit

=== Stations ===
- Gokiso Station, in Shōwa-ku, Nagoya, Aichi Prefecture, Japan
- Hamacho Station, in Chūō, Tokyo, Japan
- Hoshimi Station, in Teine-ku, Sapporo, Hokkaido, Japan
- Itayado Station, in Suma-ku, Kobe, Hyōgo Prefecture, Japan
- Kushi Station, in Iyo, Ehime Prefecture, Japan
- Talat Phlu BTS station, in Bangkok, Thailand

== Roads ==
- Mühlviertler Schnellstraße, Austria
- S10 highway (Georgia)
- Expressway S10 (Poland)
- County Route S10 (California), United States

== Vessels ==
- Brazilian submarine Guanabara (S10)
- HMCS Beaver (S10), an armed yacht of the Royal Canadian Navy
- USS S-10 (SS-115), a submarine of the United States Navy

== Other uses ==
- S 10 (Abydos), an ancient Egyptian tomb
- S10 (classification), a disability swimming classification
- S10 (singer) (born 2000), Dutch singer and rapper
- S10 (UPU standard), of the Universal Postal Union
- 40S ribosomal protein S10
- S10 ribosomal protein leader
- S10 NBC Respirator, a gas mask
- S10, a postcode district in Sheffield, England
