= HC1 =

HC1, HC-1 or HC.1 may refer to:

== Helicopter ==
- HC-1 (Helicopter Combat Support Squadron 1), a former helicopter squadron of the US Navy
- Boeing-Vertol HC-1, a large American tandem rotor helicopter
  - Boeing Chinook HC.1, operated by the Royal Air Force
- Aérospatiale-Westland Puma HC.1, a four-bladed medium transport/utility helicopter

== Technology ==
- Sony HDR-HC1, a camcorder
- HC1, a wearable headset computer in the Golden-i platform

== Other ==
- HC1, a form used in the UK to claim eligibility for support under the NHS Low Income Scheme

== See also ==
- HC-One, a British healthcare management company
