= ProHD =

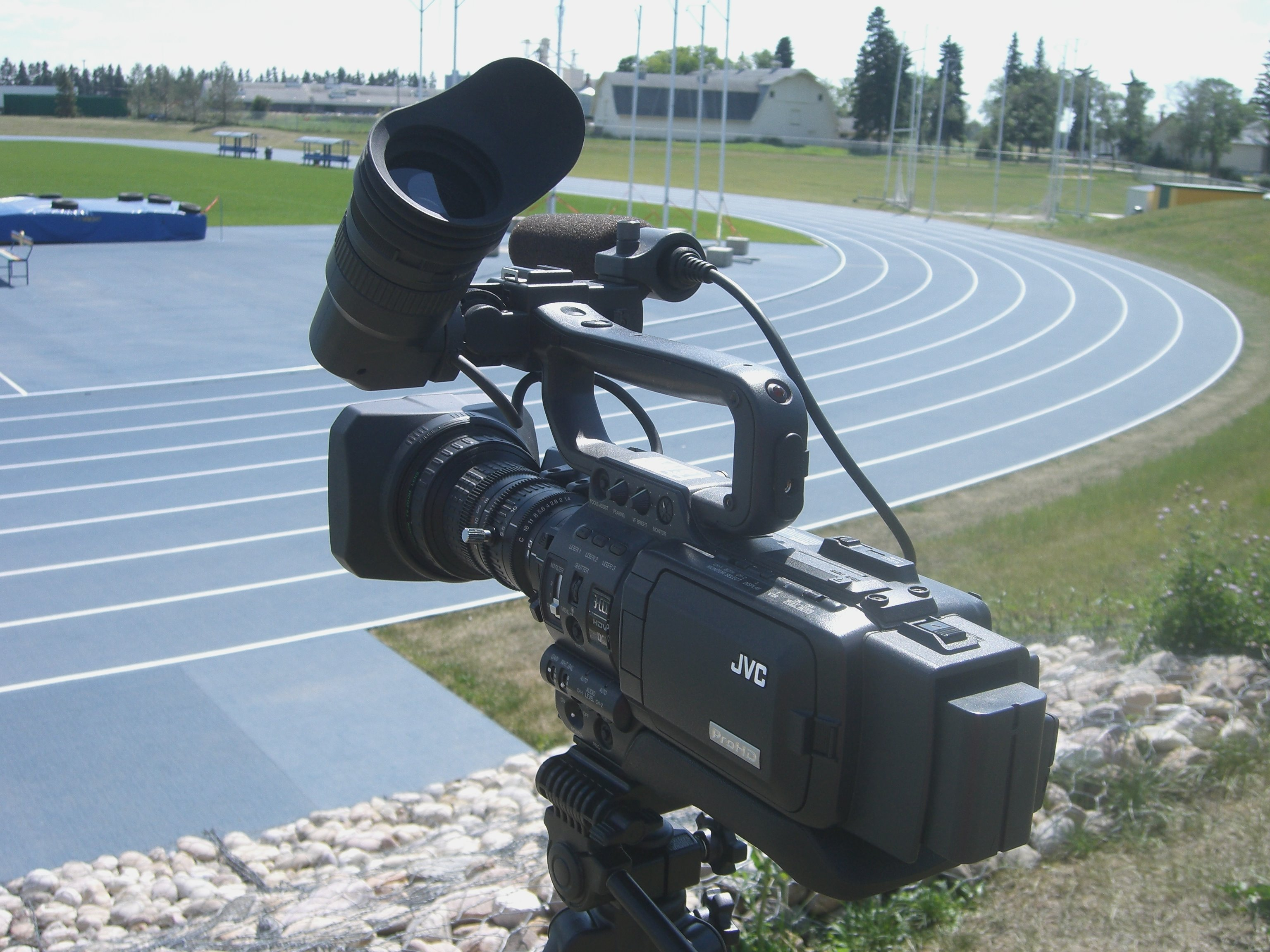
JVC GY-HD100

ProHD is a name used by JVC for its MPEG-2-based professional camcorders. ProHD is not a video recording format, but rather "an approach for delivering affordable HD products" and a common name for "bandwidth efficient professional HD models".

Originally ProHD lineup consisted of shoulder mount HDV 720p camcorders and offered 24-frame/s progressive video recording and LPCM audio recording/playback. It is a common misconception that JVC developed ProHD as a proprietary extension to HDV. JVC has stressed that 24-frame/s video and LPCM audio have always been part of the HDV format, but at the time they were initially offered no other HDV camcorder had them. The company went to great lengths to promote the format as an appropriate solution for professional high definition video production.

In 2009 JVC expanded the ProHD lineup with tapeless camcorders that record MPEG-2 video either in QuickTime or in XDCAM EX format.
