= Sony HDR-HC1 =

Digital camera model

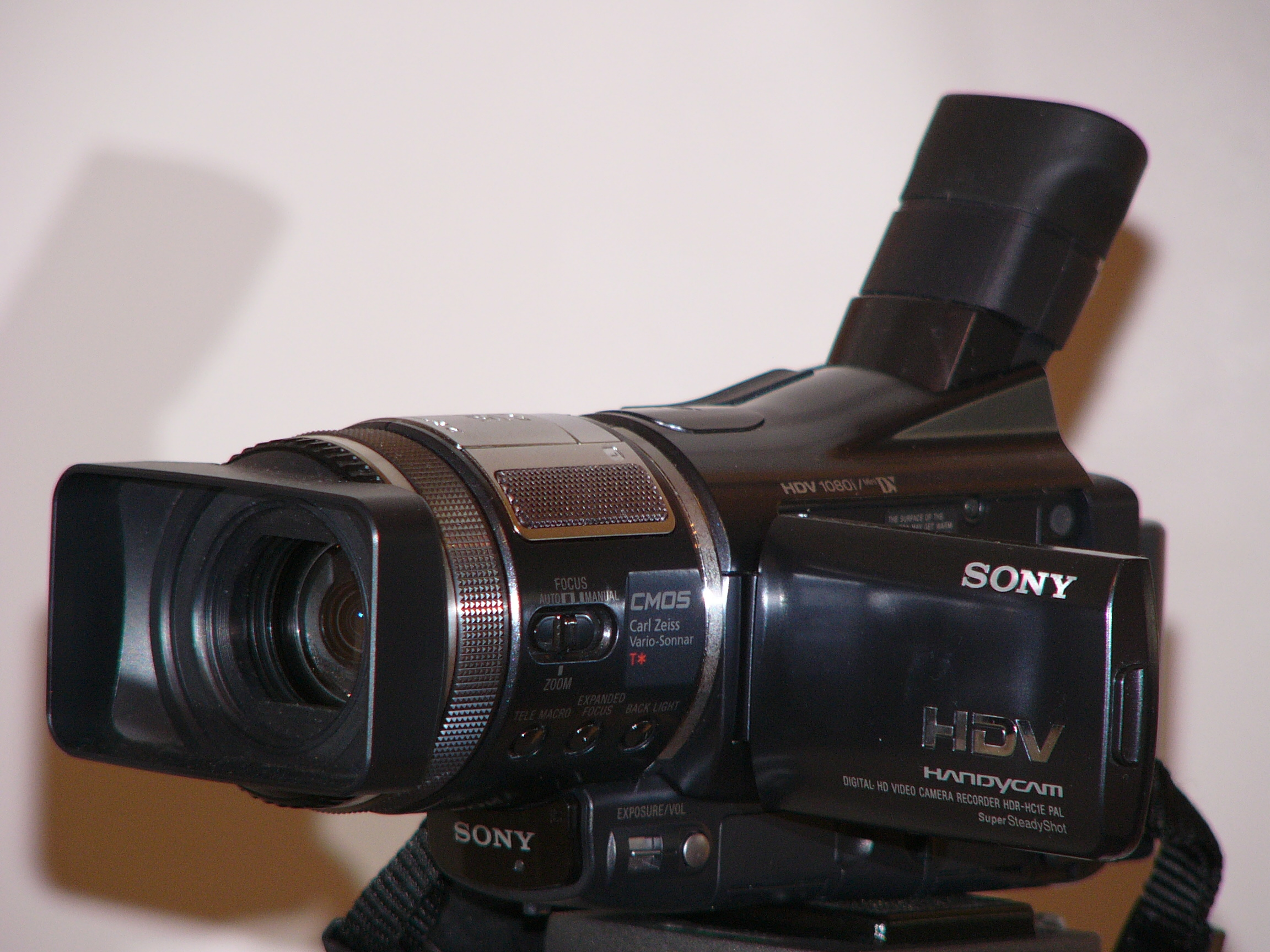
Sony HDR-HC1

The Sony HDR-HC1, introduced in mid-2005 (MSRP US$1999), is the first consumer HDV camcorder to support 1080i.

The CMOS sensor has resolution of 1920x1440 for digital still pictures and captures video at 1440x1080 interlaced, which is the resolution defined for HDV 1080i. The camera may also use the extra pixels for digital image stabilization.

The camcorder can also convert the captured HDV data to DV data for editing the video using non-linear editing systems which do not support HDV or for creating edits which are viewable on non-HDTV television sets.

The HVR-A1 is the prosumer version of the HDR-HC1. It has more manual controls and XLR ports.

== Unique features ==
=== Expanded focus ===
Expanded focus lets the user magnify the image temporarily to obtain better manual focus. Expanded focus works in pause mode only; it is not possible to magnify the frame during recording.

A similar feature, named Focus Assist, appeared on the Canon HV20, which was released two years after the HDR-HC1. Focus Assist on Canon camcorders also works only when recording is paused.

=== Spot meter and spot focus ===
Spot meter and Spot focus are possible thanks to a touch-sensitive LCD screen, employed on most modern Sony consumer camcorders.

The user can touch the screen to specify a specific region of the image; the camcorder automatically adjusts focus or exposure according to distance to the object and to illumination of the selected spot.

Depending on a scene, changing focus with Spot Focus can cause focus "breathing" or "hunting", when the subject goes in and out of focus several times before the image stabilizes.

=== Shot transition ===
Shot transition allows for a smooth automatic scene transition. In particular, it makes rack focus easy.

Two sets of focus and zoom can be preset and stored in "Store-A" and "Store-B" memory slots. The settings can then be gradually applied from one to another within 4 seconds. The transition time is not adjustable.

Presently, the HDR-HC1 is the only consumer camcorder that offers this feature. Newer Sony consumer models offer Spot Focus mode as a means for rack focus. Changing focus with Spot Focus is faster than with Shot Transition, but is not as reliable because the camera has to search for correct focus each time instead of switching to a stored value.

=== Cinema effect ===
Cinema effect produces the jerky look usually attributable to a motion picture film. In the world of professional Sony camcorders this effect is known as CineFrame shooting mode.

When Cinema effect is turned on, important manual controls such as shutter speed and aperture are disabled. Implementation of Cinema effect depends on the television system (50 Hz or 60 Hz) used in the target market.

The 50 Hz version of the camcorder, HDR-HC1E, throws away one field from the original interlaced video and doubles another, effectively halving both temporal and spatial resolution. The result can be treated as 25- frame/s progressive video because there is no motion between the two fields of one video frame.

The modification for 60 Hz market records 24- frame/s (more precisely, 23.98- frame/s) video instead, using the process known as 2-3 pulldown. While this recording scheme is widely used in other camcorders that offer 24- frame/s shooting mode, the camera employs an unusual algorithm of generating progressive frames, and then converting them back into video fields.

As Cinema effect is a synthetic method of achieving film-like motion on an interlaced camcorder, it does not improve vertical resolution or light sensitivity. On contrary, spatial resolution is reduced compared to native interlaced recording. The same or better film look effect can be achieved by shooting regular interlaced video and then converting it into pseudo-progressive format with computer software.

Other consumer-grade camcorders are more suitable for film-style recording. In particular, the Canon HV20 and the Canon HV30 camcorders have progressive imaging sensors and are capable of shooting true progressive video preserving spatial resolution and having an added benefit of better light sensitivity compared to interlaced shooting modes.
