= List of Canon camcorders =

This is a list of camcorders manufactured under the Canon brand.

== Canon Cinema EOS digital camcorders ==
- Canon EOS-1D C
- Canon EOS C70
- Canon EOS C80
- Canon EOS C100
- Canon EOS C100 Mark II
- Canon EOS C200/C200B
- Canon EOS C300
- Canon EOS C300 Mark II
- Canon EOS C300 Mark III
- Canon EOS C400
- Canon EOS C500
- Canon EOS C500 Mark II
- Canon EOS C700

== Professional digital camcorders ==
- Canon XM1 (September 1999) (known in North America as the "Canon GL1")
- Canon XA10 (March 2011) (HF G10 plus top handle)
- Canon XA20 (June 2013) (HF G30 plus top handle)
- Canon XA25 (June 2013) (XA20 plus HD-SDI output, otherwise the same camera)
- Canon XA30 (November 2015) (HF G40 plus top handle)
- Canon XA35 (November 2015) (XA30 plus HD-SDI output, otherwise the same camera)
- Canon XA11 (December 2017) (HF G21 plus top handle)
- Canon XA15 (December 2017) (XA11 plus HD-SDI output, otherwise the same camera)
- Canon XA40 (April 2019) (HF G50 plus top handle)
- Canon XA45 (April 2019) (XA40 plus HD-SDI output, otherwise the same camera)
- Canon XA50 (June 2019) (HF G60 plus top handle)
- Canon XA55 (June 2019) (XA50 plus HD-SDI output, otherwise the same camera)
- Canon XA60 (September 2022) (HF G70 plus top handle)
- Canon XA65 (September 2022) (XA60 plus HD-SDI output, otherwise the same camera)
- Canon XA70 (September 2022) (Upgraded HF G60 plus top handle)
- Canon XA75 (September 2022) (XA70 plus HD-SDI output, otherwise the same camera)
- Canon XF300 (June 2010)
- Canon XF305 (June 2010) (XF300 plus HD-SDI output, otherwise the same camera)
- Canon XF400 (September 2017) (GX10 plus top handle)
- Canon XF405 (September 2017) (XF400 plus HD-SDI output, otherwise the same camera)
- Canon XF605 (October 2021)
- Canon XF705 (December 2018)

=== Canon XF100/XF105 ===
The XF100 and XF105 are tapeless camcorders released in January 2011.

The two camcorders are the same, except the XF105 has a Genlock, Timecode, and HD/SD-SDI terminals. The units record to Compact flash cards(2 slots), which can be changed while recording. The XF100 and XF105 feature two XLR inputs and one 3.5 mm stereo mini-jack for recording audio. The video is recorded to the MXF file format.

==== Shooting formats ====
NTSC configuration

- 1080: 60i, 30p, 24p
- 720: 60p, 30p, 24p

==== Specifications ====
- Sensor: 1/3-inch 2 Megapixel CMOS
- Lens speed: F/1.8-2.8
- Optical Zoom: 10x
- Image Stabilizer: optical
- Viewfinder: Yes
- LCD Screen: 3.5 inches
- Headphone Out: Yes
- Microphone In: Yes
- Recording media: CF memory cards (cards are not included), SD memory card (pictures only)
- Weight: 2.4 lbs (without battery)

=== Canon XL-1/XL-1s ===
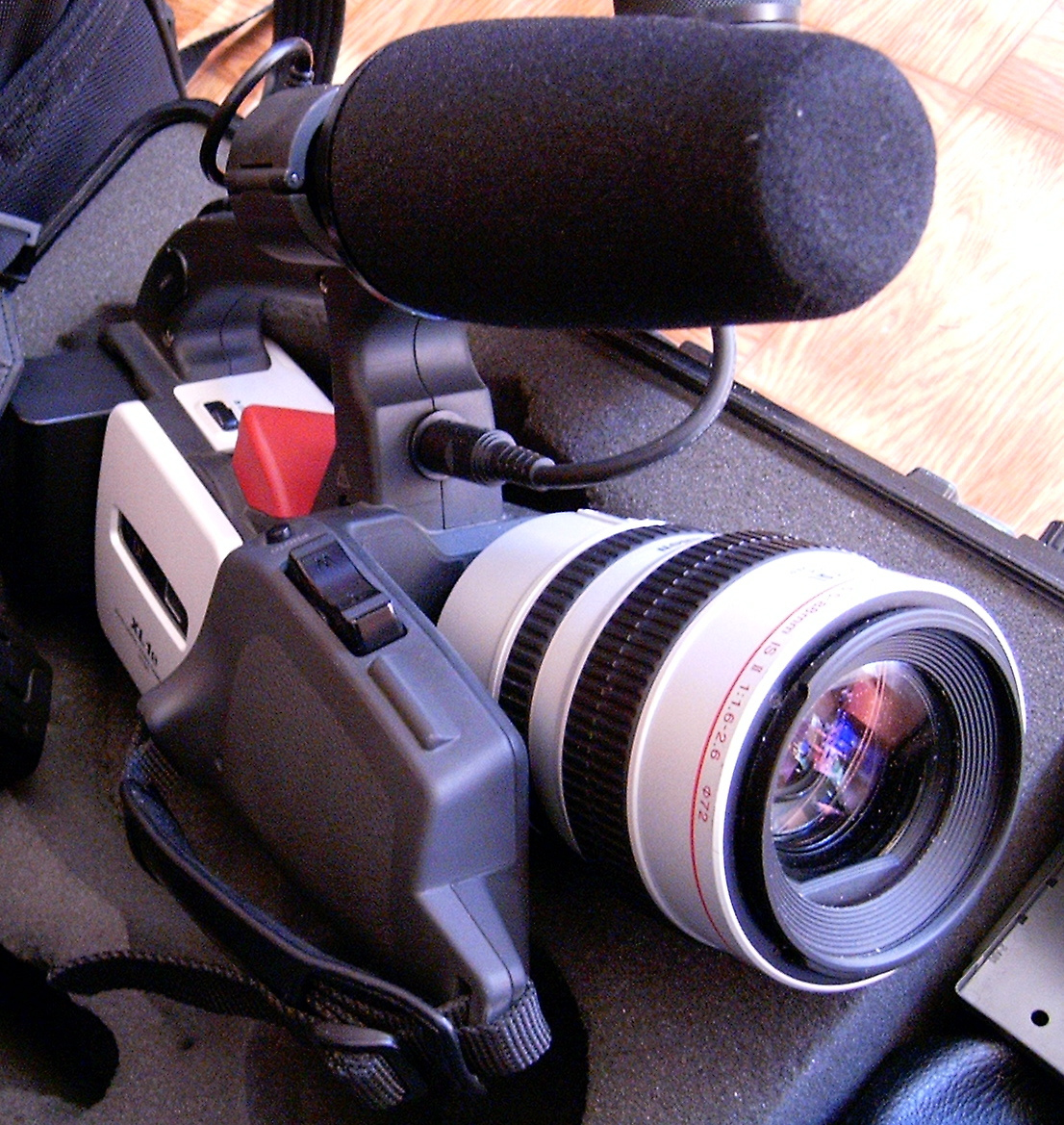
XL-1s resting on hard carrying case.

The Canon XL-1 is a three-CCD standard-definition camcorder made from 1998 to 2001. The camera was designed for the prosumer market. The successor to the XL-1s is the Canon XL-2. The XL-1 and XL-1s have many features of a high-end camera such as interchangeable lenses, viewfinders, and XLR inputs. Many features of the XL-1s were carried over into the Canon GL-2 and XL-2.

The Canon XL-1 and the XL-1s were designed to be very customizable. The camera's features include:

- 4:3, and electronic 16:9 (non-native) anamorphic aspect ratios.
- 60i, as well as "Frame" 30p picture modes.
- Optical image stabilization with the included 16X L ISII lens.
- ND Filter

The feature-length film 28 Days Later was primarily shot using XL-1's.

It is also the model of camera held by the reporter Buck Williams in the opening scene to the original Left Behind movie.

The camera was also used by the character Freddie Benson on the TV show iCarly, to shoot the in-universe webshow.

=== Canon XL-2 ===
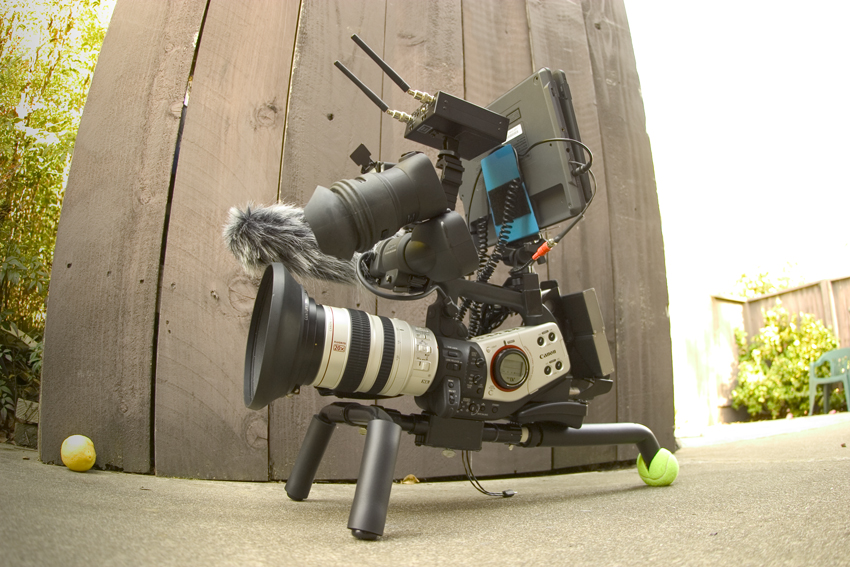
Canon XL2 with some peripheral attachments, including wireless microphones and external monitor

The Canon XL-2, released in 2004, is Canon's prosumer 3CCD standard-definition camcorder. The XL-2 is the big brother to the GL family and the successor of the similar looking Canon XL-1s. It is succeeded by the Canon XL-H1 with a similar 20x lens and similar design, but in black.

The Canon XL-2 was designed to be very customizable, along with an array of pro-grade features. Some of these include:

- 4:3 and 16:9 aspect ratios
- 60i, 24p, and 30p frame rates
  - with selectable 2:3 or 2:3:3:2 pulldown in 24p mode
- 4-channel audio
- Optical image stabilization with the included 20X L IS lens
- Control of gamma, knee, and much more to get the desired picture
- Open architecture design
- Interchangeable lenses, one of the most popular lenses is the 3x zoom wide angle lens often used for short films as it has a low price.

The camera also has 2 XLR inputs in the back, as well as the capability to add 2 more with an adapter that plugs into the accessory shoe. This makes it useful for use with wireless microphones or other audio sources. The XL2 records to a MiniDV tape and can export to a computer via a FireWire (IEEE 1394) port. The XL2 is one of only a few cameras that can record to all 4 MiniDV audio tracks simultaneously.

=== Canon XL H1 ===
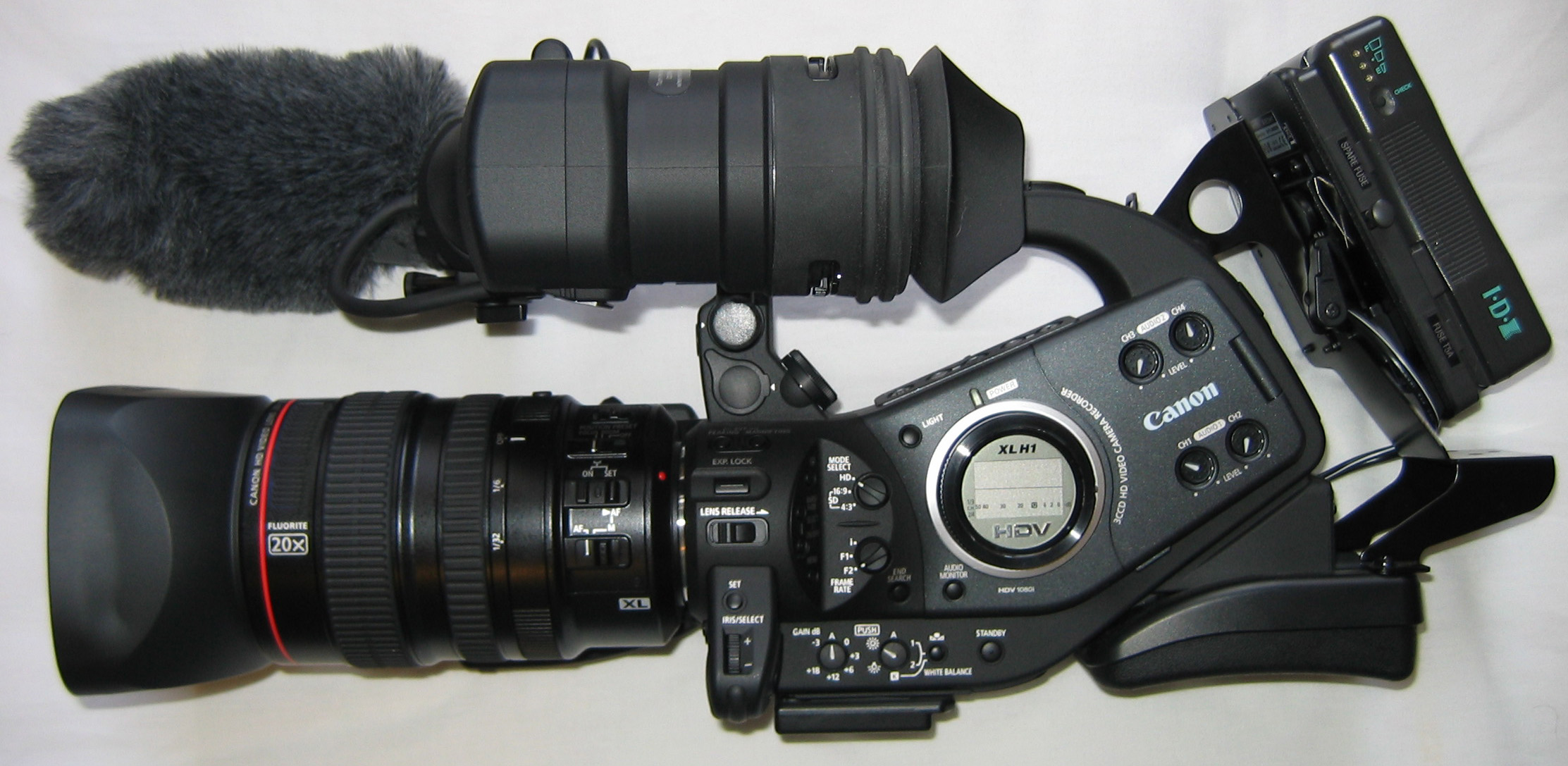
The Canon XL-H1 HDV camera, with a few accessories.

The Canon XL H1 is Canon's first HDV camcorder with interchangeable lenses. It is the successor to the Canon XL-2. It can shoot in the HDV standard resolution of 1440×1080 pixels and has 3 native interlaced 1440×1080 CCDs (The photosites are 1.33:1 aspect ratio, allowing for a full 16:9 frame) where Sony's HVR-V1U has 960×1080 diagonal photosites, and Panasonic's AG-HVX200 pixel shifted 960×540 (goes to 1280×1080 but theoretically with pixel shift, has a resolution of 1440×810).

The camera can also shoot in standard definition in either 16:9 or 4:3. It has an HD-SDI uncompressed output. There's also component uncompressed HD output.

==== Shooting formats ====
NTSC configuration:

- 1080: 60i, 30f, 24f.
- 480: 60i, 30f, 24f.

PAL configuration:

- 1080: 50i, 25f.
- 576: 50i, 25f.

Users could pay for Canon to re-configure the camera to shoot in 50i and 25f. 24f, not to be taken as 24p, is derived from cooler running interlaced CCDs that are clocked at 48 Hz. Every two of the 48 fields are captured at precisely the same moment in time providing an image capture in camera without the need of any additional internal cooling devices for the CCDs. The digital signal processor that enables the CCDs to capture in the "f" frame rate is called DIGIC DV II (DIGital Image Core – DigitalVideo version II). The technology is similar to the DIGIC II that Canon uses for their digital still cameras. Much of the technology is being kept under wraps, and the manufacturer of the CCDs is being kept secret.

==== Compatibility ====
The XL H1 was shipped by Canon in one of two basic configurations, aiming the unit at either NTSC or PAL markets. The NTSC configuration supports NTSC DV and NTSC HDV 1080i60, 30f and 24f. The PAL configuration supports PAL DV and HDV at 1080i50. A modification was available from a Canon Authorised Service Centre to make a single unit capable of both sets of systems, allowing users to switch "personality" through an on-screen menu selection. Owners of the PAL / 1080i50 version will probably require this modification, as it is a pre-requisite to obtaining 24f operation.

At present, the XL H1 24f and 30f HDV is supported by major non-linear editing systems such as Canopus/Grass Valley Edius 5.0, Sony Vegas, Adobe Premiere Pro 2.0, Apple Final Cut Pro 5.1.2 and Avid Xpress Pro. As of January 29, 2007, Final Cut Pro does not support standard definition 24f or 30f.

1080i60 and 1080i50 are cross-compatible with Sony's implementation of HDV; Canon 1080i50 and 1080i60 can play on Sony HDV cameras and decks. Canon's 24f, 25f, and 30f are not cross-compatible with Sony's implementation of HDV. No 1080 HDV footage will play on JVC HDV cameras or decks.

==== 2008 updates ====
In 2008, Canon updated their XL line with the addition of the XL H1A and XL H1S. The H1A and H1S are almost exactly the same except for the exclusion of the "Jackpack" (HD SDI, Genlock, Timecode) on the H1A. The kit lens includes an iris ring and a more sensitive zoom. The H1S and H1A also have a stronger headphone jack. They are no longer made out of plastic, but metal, making them less prone to breaking.

=== Canon XH-A1(s)/XH-G1(s) ===
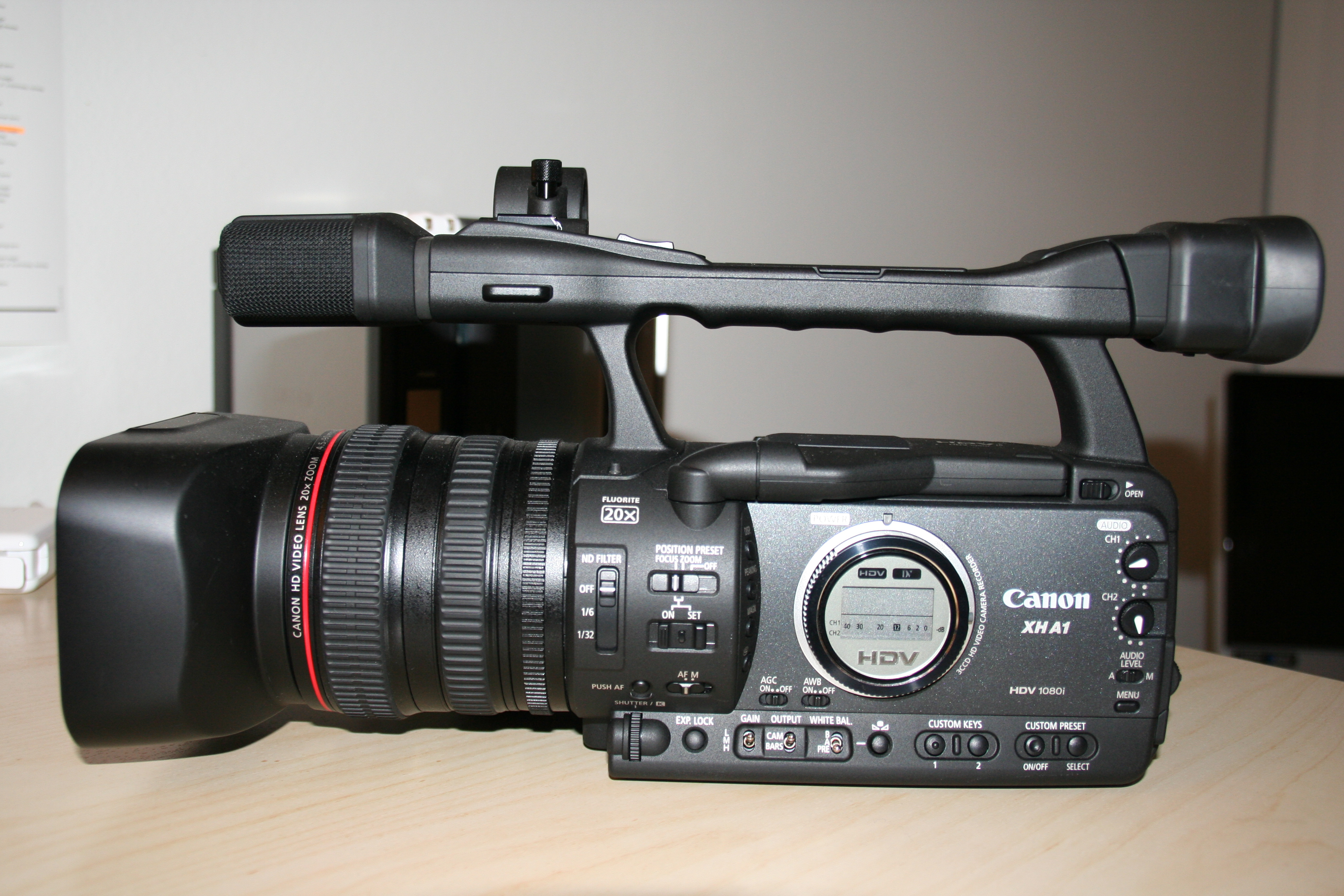
Canon XH A1

The XH A1 and the XH G1 are professional handheld HDV camcorders manufactured by Canon. The form factor of the cameras is a close successor to the Canon GL2, with the newer HDV models being slightly larger and heavier. The cameras were marketed towards independent and documentary filmmakers, and for broadcasters and journalists for electronic news gathering.

Both cameras share the same basic design and body, though the XH G1 is geared towards professional multi-camera production and includes connections for HD-SDI/SD-SDI Out, genlock, and time code. The cameras were originally released in 2006, the updated versions XH-A1s and XH G1s came out in December 2008.

The Canon XH A1 has been used in a variety of applications in broadcast, on-line, and theatrical productions. Use of the camera in professional applications includes the Chicago Tribune's on-line videos, and the camera was used for the production of the motion picture Crank: High Voltage.

==== Technical details ====
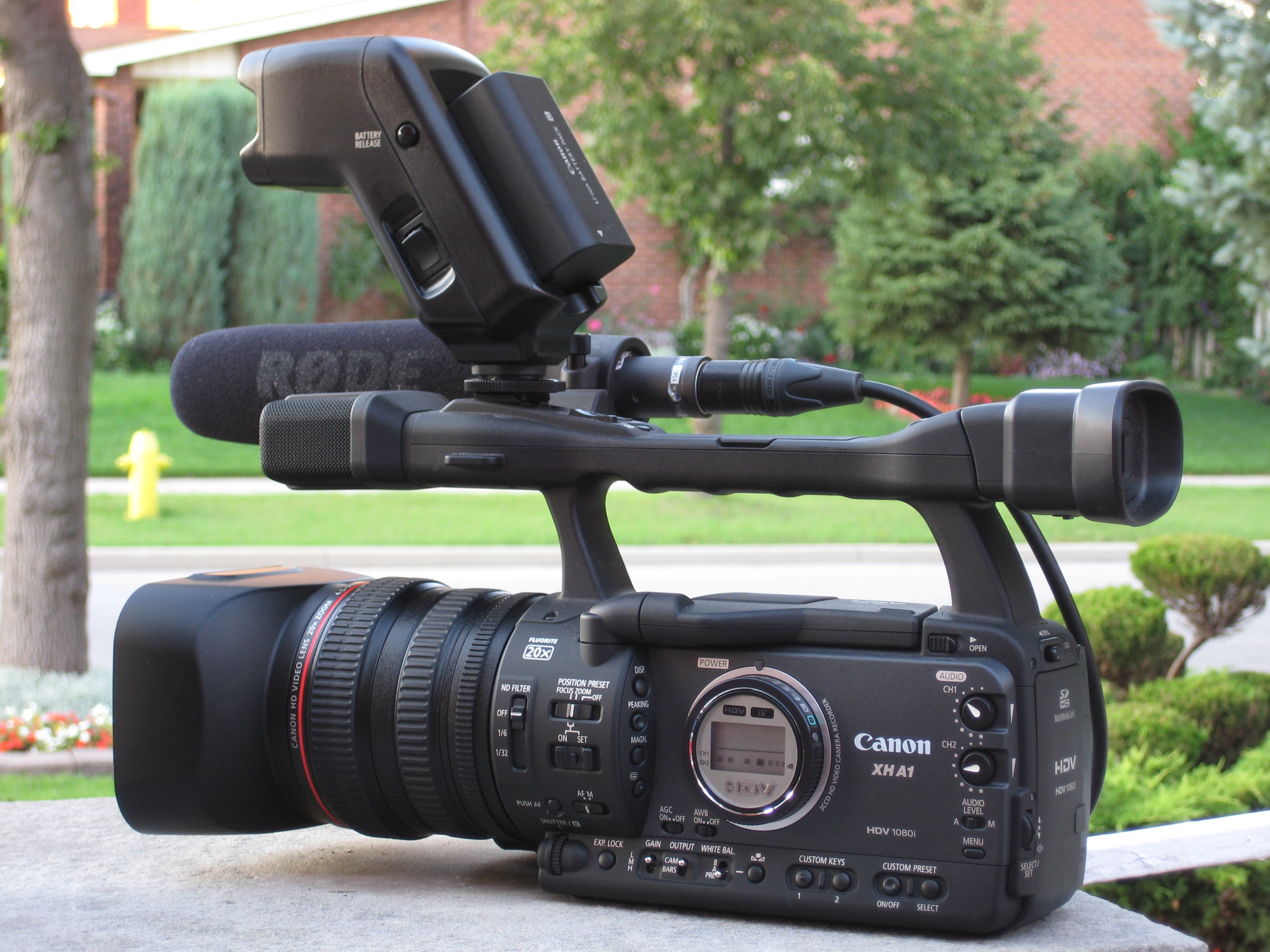
The XH A1 with a typical ENG setup

The camera is capable of shooting and recording with either 60 Hz or 50 Hz scanning rates. The default rate depends on the region where the camera is sold, but the camcorder can be made 50 Hz / 60 Hz switchable for additional fee. Video is recorded to MiniDV cassettes with a maximum record time of 80 minutes. CCDs are the image sensor technology used in the camera with a resolution of 1440 × 1080 in high definition Mode. When recording in standard definition in a 4:3 aspect ratio an area of 1080 × 1080 pixels is used on the sensor, and the entire 1440 × 1080 sensor is used for 16:9 standard definition recording.

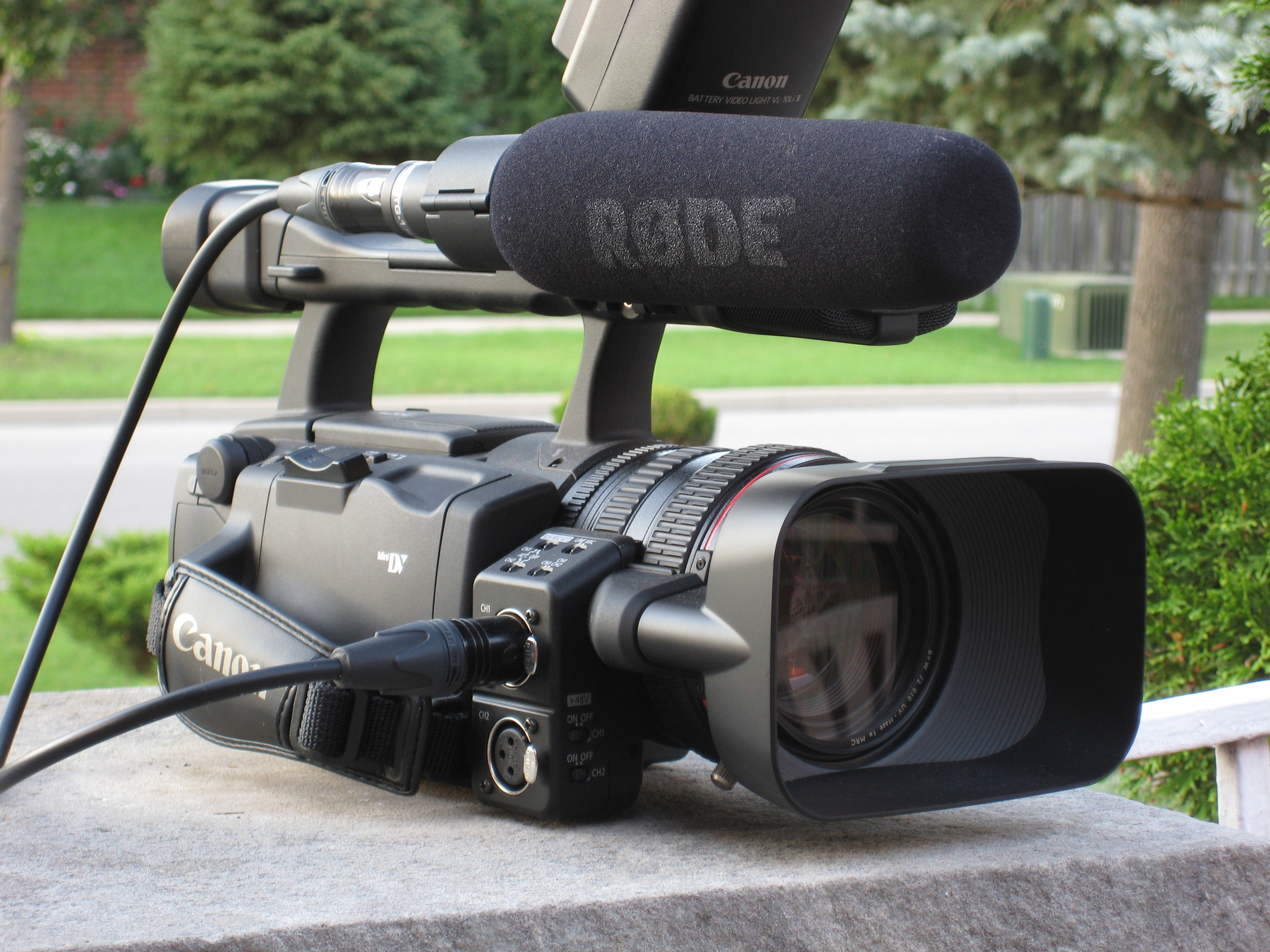
The XH-A1 showing a professional shotgun microphone and XLR audio

Customizations to the image on the camera include gamma, knee, black levels, color gain, and sharpness settings. These settings allow the operator to develop a look for the production within the camera.

Shooting modes of both HDV and DV include 60i, 30F, and 24F for a 60 Hz version. 50 Hz version offers recording modes of 50i and 25F. Vertical resolution of the progressive video shot in "F" mode is about 25% lower than theoretically possible, because it is generated from interlaced CCD sensors by using row-pair summation but is still higher than the resolution of a single field.

Tapes, recorded in HDV "F" mode are compatible with Native Progressive Recording mode offered on some Sony camcorders. A progressive video output is available via a FireWire (IEEE 1394) port. 1080i or 480i component video is via a D3 connector more commonly seen on Japanese consumer electronics. To preserve compatibility with existing interlaced equipment, 480i composite video is always available via either a BNC connector, or a 3.5mm TRS connector. Video shot in DV "F" mode is recorded to tape in interlaced format.

==== 2008 updates ====
Canon released its model XH A1S and XH G1s in 2008. Updated features include acceleration/deceleration control of the zoom, separate audio sensitivity settings for the two input XLR audio channels and the ability to simultaneously record sound from the input and external microphone.

==== Optics ====
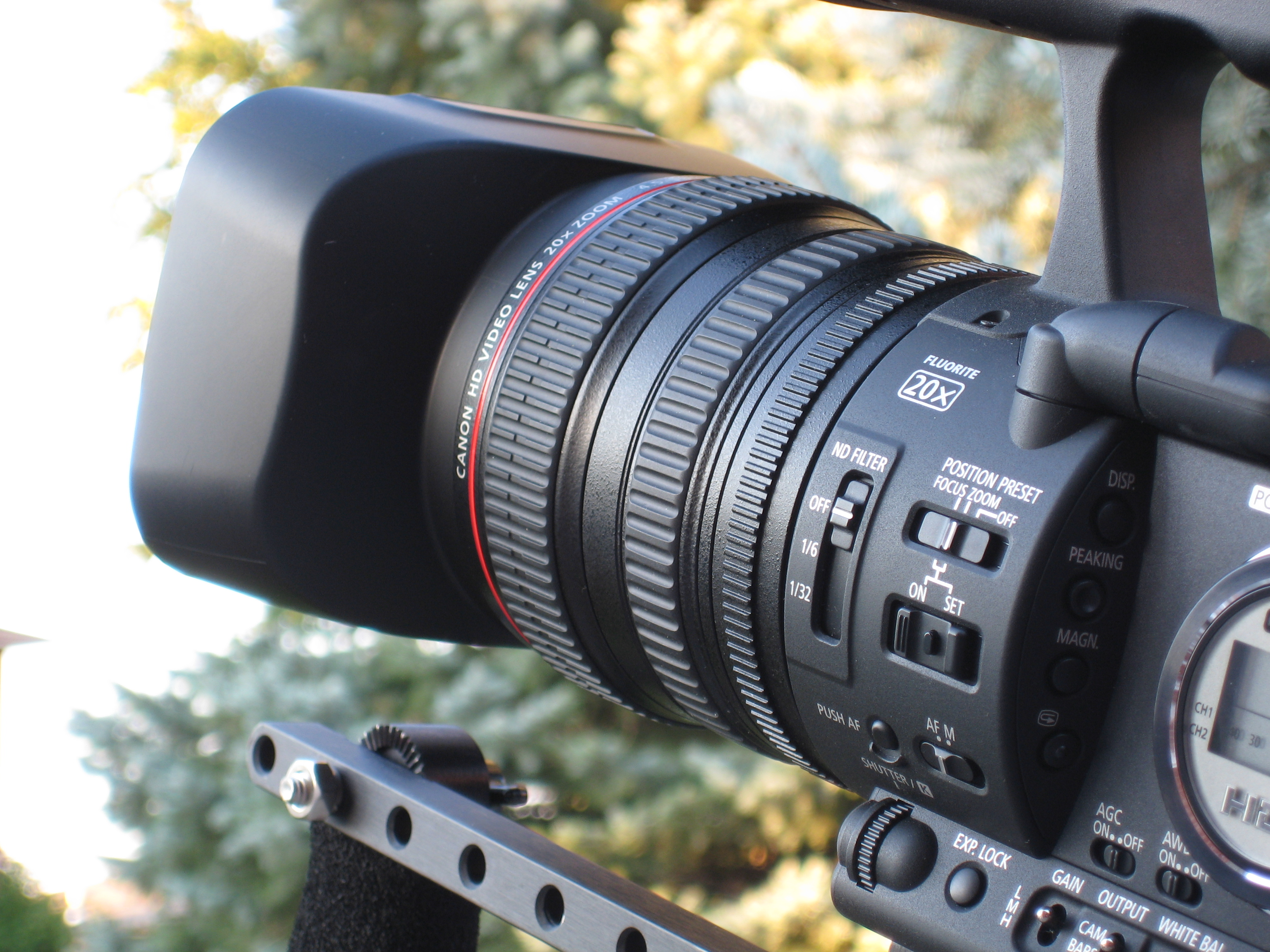
The XH A1 lens with its three control rings visible

The built-in lens has a focal length of 4.5 mm - 90 mm (equivalent to 32.5 mm - 650 mm for 35 mm), with a maximum f/stop of f/1.6. Canon also includes its image stabilization technology on the camera, the same technology used in many of their Single-lens reflex camera lenses. The lens body has three rings affecting focus, zoom and aperture; however, these rings do not manually drive the lens. Instead, sensors measure the movement of the rings and electronically drive the lens through built-in motors allowing for smoother operation and more feedback telling the user exactly what focal range, aperture f-number and zoom number the lens is set to. The lens thread supports 72 mm filters and adapters such as fisheye and wide-angle lenses. Modern devices such as the Letus35 also allow for 35 mm lenses to be attached providing a very shallow depth of field and create a more "film" like feel which is often desired by many amateur film makers and allows for even greater operational flexibility of the XH A1.

==== Audio ====
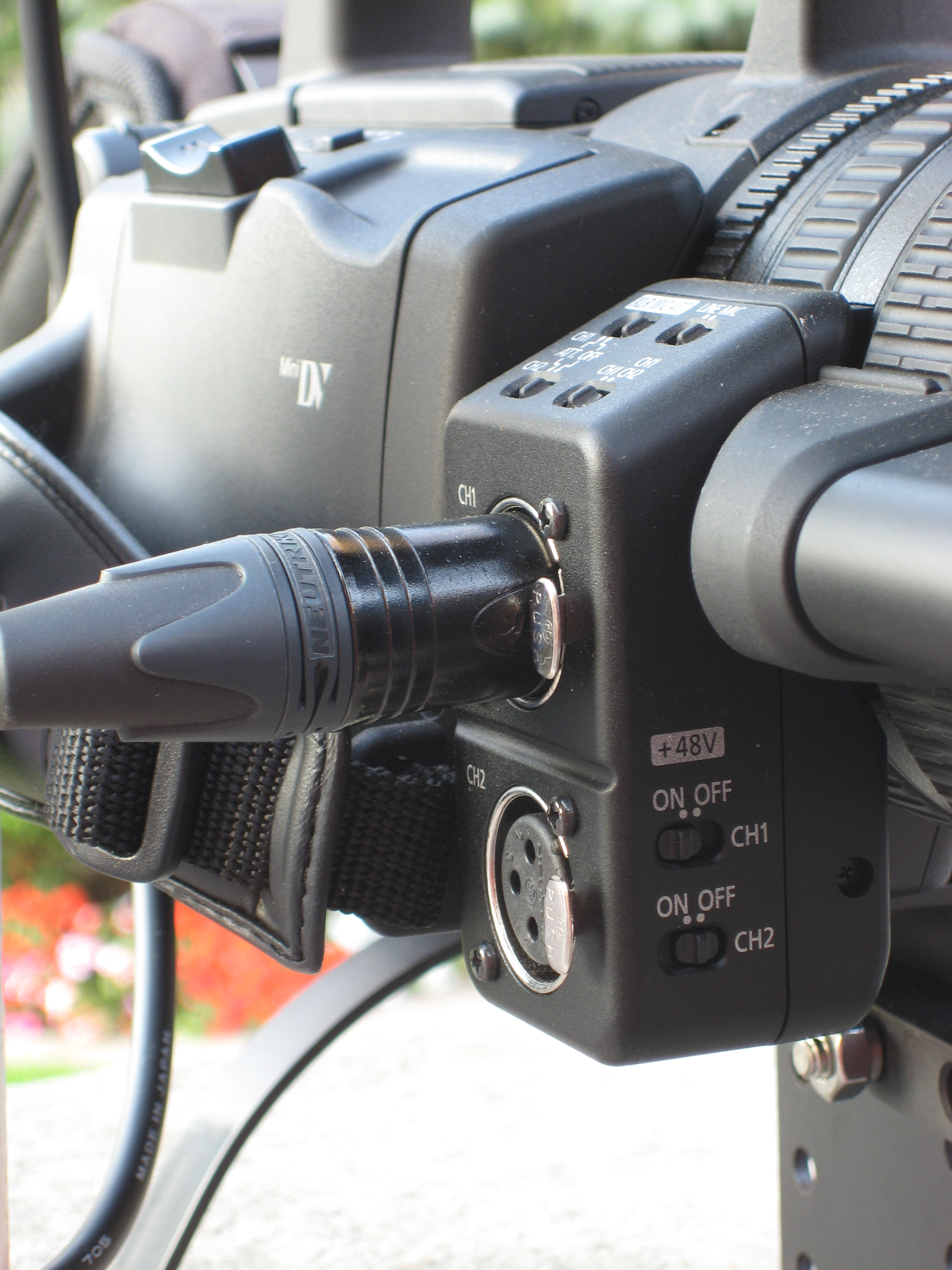
Canon XH A1 showing two channels of XLR audio with a number of features operated with switches.

The XH A1 provides two channels of audio through the built-in microphone or via external XLR audio. In HDV mode the camera can record two 16-bit channels at a rate of 192 kbit/s and 1.5 Mbit/s in DV mode.

The official web site states that (HDV standard):
HDV: 2-channel recording MPEG1 Audio Layer II: (bit rate 384 kbit/s)
In SD mode:
DV: 2-channel recording PCM digital recording: 16 bits (48 kHz), 12 bits (32 kHz, 12 bits selectable).
XH-A1s improves audio connections and addressing flaws from the original XH-A1.

=== Canon XM2/GL2 ===
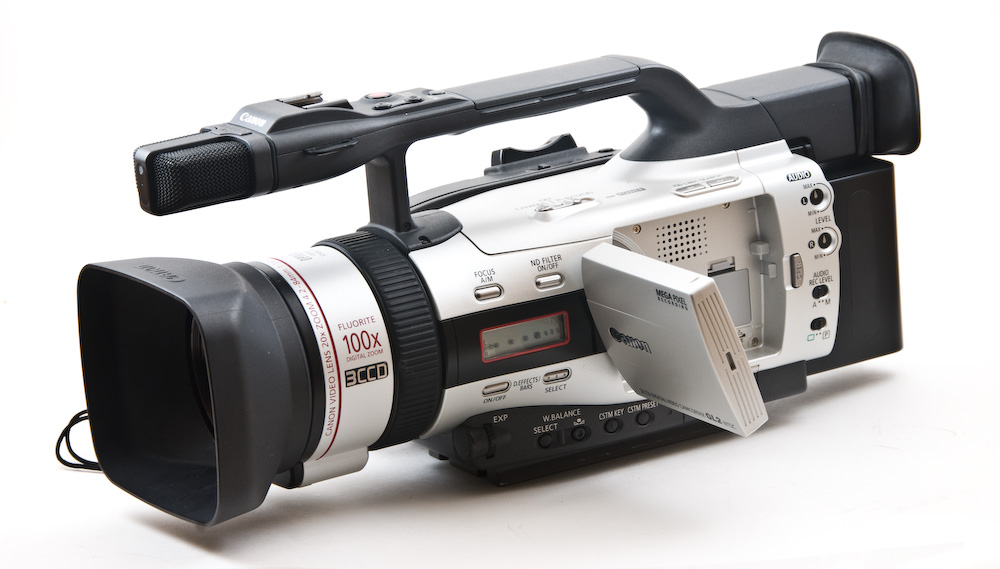
The GL2 has fewer features than the GL1 but is much more portable.

Canon XM2/GL2 is a PAL or NTSC Mini DV camcorder, the successor to the Canon XM1/GL1.

==== Features ====
Part of their high-end, "prosumer" range, notable features include zebra patterning, colour gain, phase and sharpness. It has a 2.5 inch LCD and 0.44 inch viewfinder, a bulky auto/manual focus button on the front, and a large rubber manual focus ring for quick or pull focusing. It also includes such features as 3 1/4″ CCDs, manual and auto focus and white balance, and the ability to attach a wide variety of accessories, making it popular with amateur and independent filmmakers. It has a fixed fluorite zoom lens and records to MiniDV cassettes. Its operating weight, when batteries and tapes are included, is under four pounds.

The GL2 differs from its predecessor, the Canon GL1, in a few notable ways. First, The CCD was improved to allow more accurate edge-to-edge imaging. While this was entirely in the overscan area of broadcast television, the improvement is visible in conversions to film and in video distributed on the web. Slower shutter speeds were introduced, all the way down to 1/8 of a second in video mode. The GL2 also introduced features for digital effects and color bars in-camera, as well as 1.7 Megapixel still camera features for use with an SD card.

==== Specifications ====
- ¼″ 470K pixel 3CCD with pixel shift,
- Canon Professional L-Series Fluorite Lens,
- 20x optical zoom/100x digital zoom,
- Optical image stabiliser,
- Direction accurate stereo microphone,
- Two-channel audio level manual control with VU meter,
- 2.5″ 200K colour LCD screen,
- Sockets Include; Lanc, Headphone, Dc In, Microphone, Dv in/out, Av in/out/, USB, S-Video,

== Consumer camcorders ==
=== Canon DV 012/Optura 100 MC ===
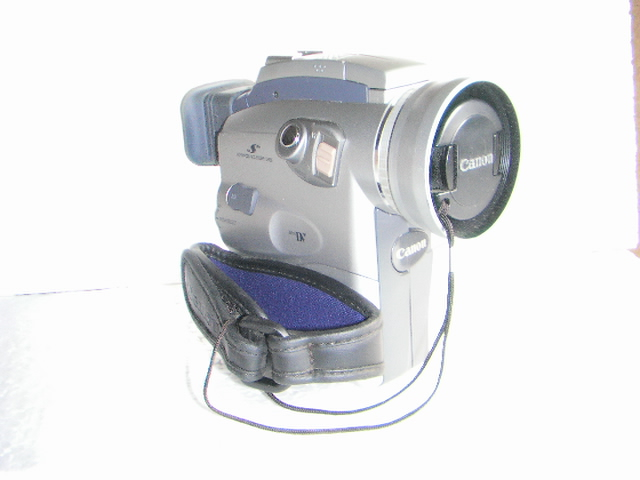
Optura 100 MC

Canon DV 012 is a single CCD Mini DV camcorder. It was sold in North America under the name Optura 100 MC.

Still images may be recorded onto an SD flash memory card with an image resolution of either 1280×960 or 640×480 and an image quality of either fine or standard.

When held in the hands, the Canon DV 012 is a sturdy camcorder that imparts a heavy feeling of ruggedness. It was replaced by the Optura 200 MC, which has a nearly identical exterior appearance.

- Canon MVX250i (known in North America as the Canon Elura 70)

=== Canon MV500 ===
The Canon MV500 is a MiniDV camcorder. It features a 18× optical zoom and a 360× digital zoom.

=== Canon MV600 ===
The Canon MV600 is a MiniDV camcorder. It features a 18× optical zoom and a 360× digital zoom.

=== Canon MV630i ===
The Canon MV630i is a MiniDV camcorder. It features a 20× optical zoom and a 400× digital zoom.

=== Canon MV900 ===
The Canon MV900 is a MiniDV camcorder. It features a 25× optical zoom and an 800/100× digital zoom. Like the MV500 series, it has an analog S-video socket but lacks digital FireWire/DV connectivity.

=== Canon MVX100i ===
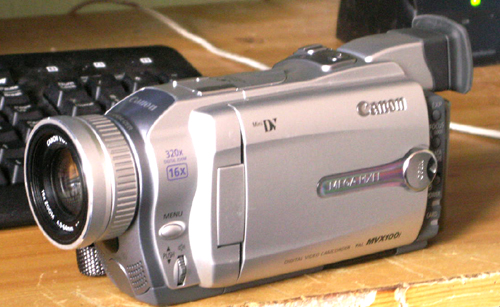
Canon MVX100i

The Canon MVX100i is a MiniDV camcorder. It features a 16× optical zoom and a 320× digital zoom, a 2.5-inch LCD screen, and a manual focus feature. It also features manual adjustment for brightness, audio volume, exposure, white balance and has several built-in digital effects, including nine fades and nine video effects. The MVX100i also has the ability to take still pictures that can be saved to an SD memory card and can record video in long and short play. The audio system is a PCM digital stereo and can capture in 16 or 12 bits. The terminal features sockets for headphones, external microphones, analogue-in, direct print, AV and S-video, and the video is captured to a computer via either FireWire or USB. It has an accessory shoe on the top and takes a Li-ion battery. It weighs 620 grams.

=== Canon MVX250i ===
The MVX250i (as it is known in Europe), or the Elura 70 (as it is known in North America), is a digital video camera manufactured under the Canon brand. One of its features is an optional aspect ratio of 16:9.

=== Canon L1/L2 ===
The Canon L1, LX-1 (in Japan), or EX1Hi (in Europe), is a consumer Hi-8 video camcorder released in March 1991. The L1 was the first camcorder in the world with interchangeable lenses, it uses the Canon VL Lens System.

The Canon L2, LX-1T (in Japan), or EX2Hi (in Europe), is the successor to the L1, but is nearly identical in all but a few features such as the addition of time codes and shuttle-ring-equipped remote control.

=== Canon HV10 ===
The Canon HV10 is a consumer high definition video (HDV) camcorder released in September 2006.

The HV10 features both HDV and DV recording. DV can be recorded in both 4:3 and 16:9 formats. In Europe, the camcorder is called the HV10E and features PAL DV recording in addition to HDV 1080i50 mode. The HV10 does 1080i60 and NTSC. It can capture video at the full 1920 × 1080 interlaced resolution, however the horizontal resolution is reduced when it is stored to tape in the HDV standard of 1440 × 1080 resolution.

=== Canon HV20 ===
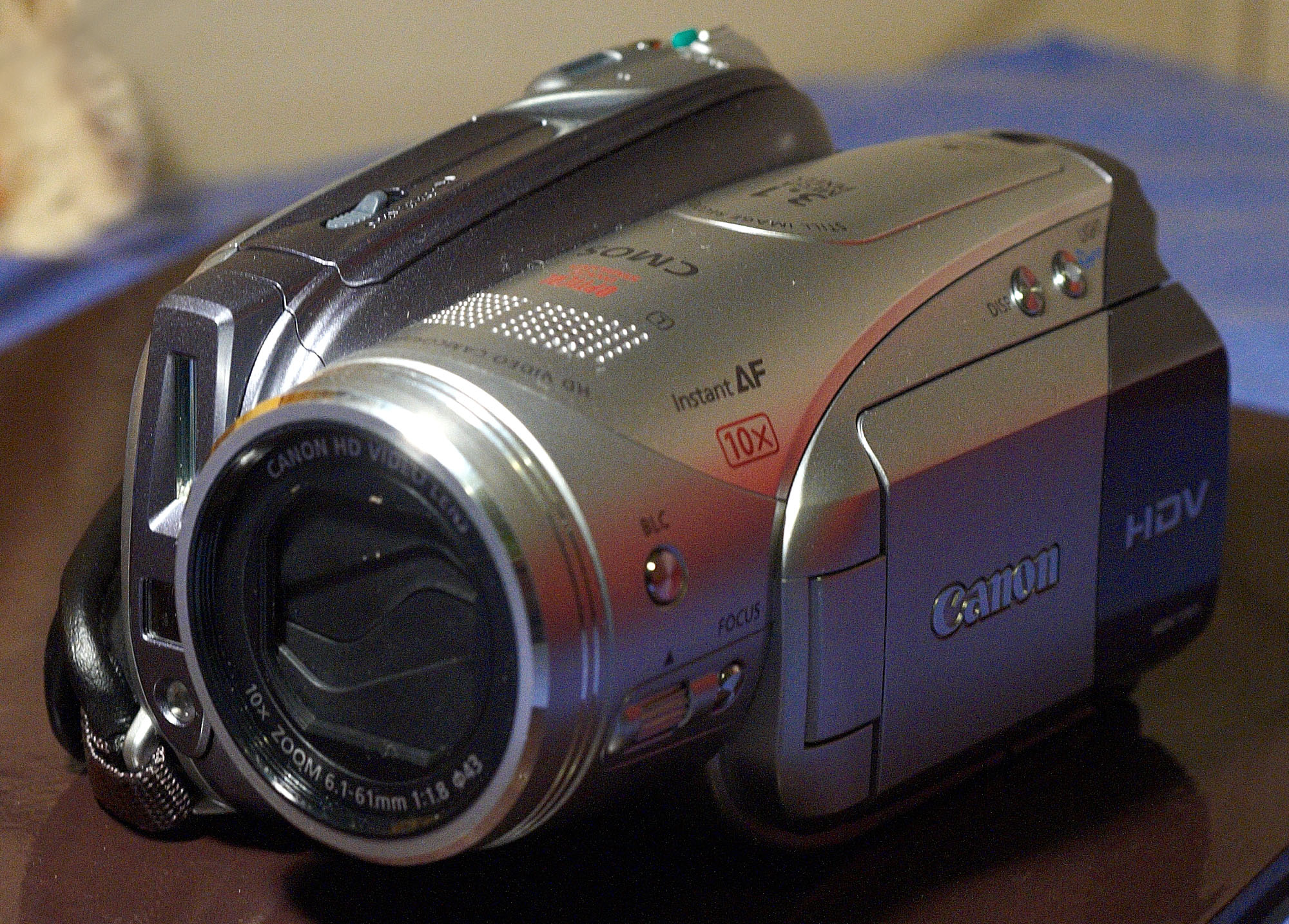
Canon HV20 camcoder

The Canon HV20 is an HDV camcorder. Announced January 30, 2007, it is the first consumer-grade camcorder to shoot 1080p24. Consequently, it has become popular with low-budget film/video makers. It is the successor to the HV10, which was Canon's first consumer HDV camcorder.

The NTSC-region camera shoots at 24p which gives a film-like look in PF24 mode, using 2:3 pulldown in a 60i stream. In PAL regions, it can record in native 25p mode and as such does not require the same pull-down removal techniques that the NTSC edition does. The camera is capable of recording in both HDV and DV formats, on MiniDV, though it's unable to record 24p in the DV format.

The camera uses a 1/2.7" CMOS sensor, which is shared with other consumer high definition cameras manufactured by Canon, such as the HV10, HR10 and HG10. The replacement for the HV20, the HV30, was released in March 2008, soon followed by the HV40.

=== Canon HV30 ===
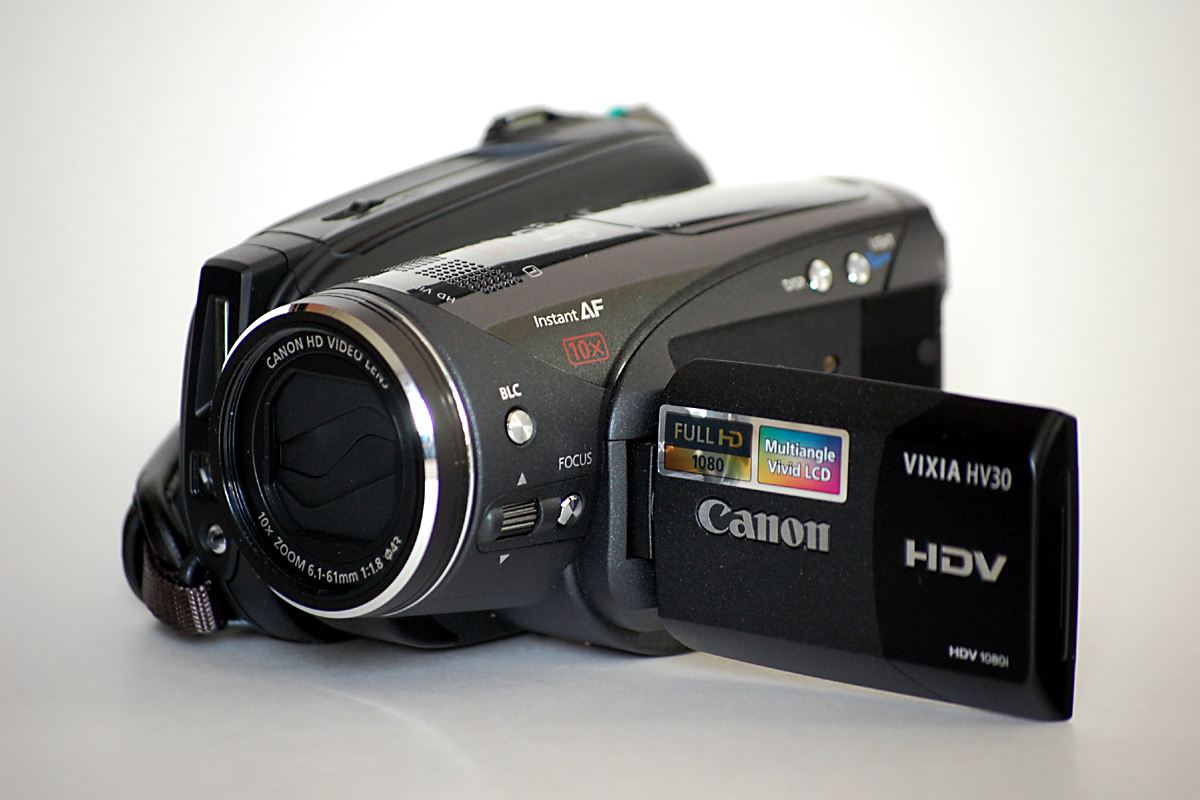
Canon HV30 camcorder

The Canon HV30 is an HDV camcorder. It was announced in January 2008 and went on sale in March 2008. In the NTSC version, it is the first consumer-grade camcorder to shoot 1080p30 video in addition to PF24 24fps mode that was pioneered by its predecessor, the HV20. The HV30 has since been replaced by the 2009 model, the HV40.

The NTSC-region camera shoots in three modes: the standard 60i interlaced video, 24p film-like video with 2:3 pulldown, and 30p PsF-style video. In PAL regions, it can record in 25p mode, which is also recorded to tape in PsF fashion. The PAL version does not record 30p or 24p. The camera is capable of recording in both HDV and DV formats, onto MiniDV tape, though it's unable to record 24p in the DV format.

The camera uses a 1/2.7" CMOS sensor, which is shared with other consumer high definition cameras manufactured by Canon, such as the HV10, HV20, HV40, HR10, HG10, and DC50.

=== Canon HV40 ===
The Canon HV40 is an HDV camcorder. It was announced in January 2009.

The NTSC version supports native 24p in addition to 24p-over-60i. The latter was the only 24 FPS format available on the HV20 and HV30.

=== Canon HG10 ===
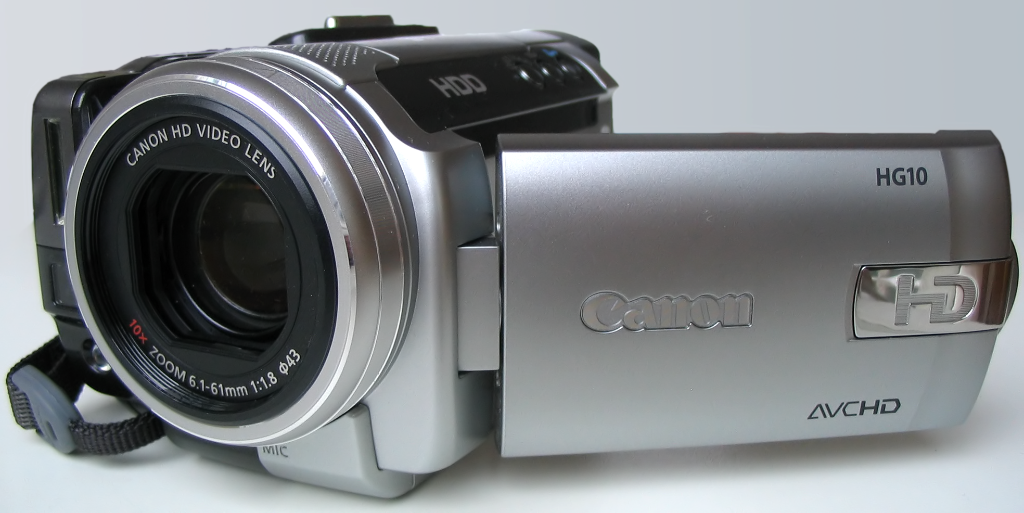
Canon HG10

The Canon HG10 is Canon's first AVCHD codec high definition, hard disk drive camcorder and also the first hard disk drive camera from the company. Its hardware is similar to the popular HV20. The 1/2.7" bayer pattern CMOS sensor in the camera is manufactured by Canon and is used in other Canon cameras such as the Canon HV10, Canon HV20, Canon HV30 and Canon HR10. The size of the hard disk drive is 40 GB. One of the key features of the 60 Hz-market models is its ability to capture 24frame/s progressive video in the PF24 mode which is recorded as 60frame/s interlaced video to the hard disk drive by use of a 2:3 pulldown.

=== HR Series ===
- Canon HR10

=== HG Series ===
- Canon HG10
- Canon HG11
- Canon HG20
- Canon HG21

=== HF Series ===
- Canon HF11
- Canon HF20
- Canon HF100

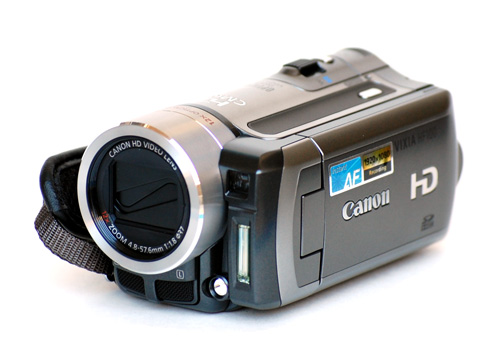
Canon VIXIA HF100 camcorder

The VIXIA HF100 and VIXIA HF10 are tapeless camcorders unveiled in January 2008 and put on sale in April 2008. The camcorders record high definition AVCHD video onto an SD card. It has no viewfinder and no focus ring. Video can be recorded in four quality settings: FXP (1920 × 1080, 17 Mbit/s), XP+ (1440 × 1080, 12 Mbit/s), SP (1440 × 1080, 7 Mbit/s), and LP (1440 × 1080, 5 Mbit/s). A SDHC card with the capacity of 16 GB can hold up to 2 hours of video recorded at highest quality setting.

When recording to a memory card, the recording time depends only on capacity of the card. The HF100 uses full-size SDHC memory cards. One 4 GB card can fit roughly 30 minutes of video at highest quality setting (FXP). A Class 4 or higher card is required to be able to record in FXP mode. In earlier versions of the firmware, Class 10 cards could not be used to record in FXP mode. Firmware version 1.0.3.0 released in July 2011 enabled support for Class 10 cards.

The VIXIA HF10 has 16 GB of internal memory, complementing the same full-size SD memory card slot as the HF100.

The distinguishing features of this camcorder include:

- External microphone jack
- Headphone jack
- Mini Advanced Shoe (proprietary)
- Threaded lens barrel for attachments (37mm)

==== Specifications ====
- Sensor: 1/3.2-inch 3.2 Megapixel CMOS
- Lens speed: F/1.8-3.0
- Filter Diameter: 37mm
- Optical Zoom: 12x
- Image Stabilizer: optical
- Viewfinder: No
- LCD Screen: 2.7 inches
- Headphone Out: Yes
- Microphone In: Yes
- Recording media: SDHC memory cards (card is not included)
- Weight: 380g (without battery)

=== HF R series ===
Canon HF R5xx, R6xx, and R7xx are practically identical camcorders despite being numbered successively. The only major difference is the size of the included internal flash memory. These are the consumer entry-level models. LANC jack is only available using the RA-V1 advanced mini shoe adapter. 37mm filter ring. The name "VIXIA" is used for the NTSC models (as listed below) and "LEGRIA" for the PAL models which are, in other respects, virtually identical.

- Canon VIXIA HF R100/R10/R11 Introduced 2008
- Canon VIXIA HF R200/R20/R21 Introduced 2009
- Canon VIXIA HF R300/R30/R32 Introduced 2010
- Canon VIXIA HF R400/R40/R42 Introduced 2012
- Canon VIXIA HF R500/R50/R52 Introduced 2013
- Canon VIXIA HF R600/R60/R62 Introduced 2015
- Canon VIXIA HF R700/R70/R72 Introduced 2016
- Canon VIXIA HF R800/R80/R82 Introduced 2017 (MP4 only)

=== HF M series ===
Similar to R series except it has more features. 1/4" CMOS sensor with 3.8 megapixels. LANC jack is only available using the RA-V1 advanced mini shoe adapter. 37 mm filter ring. Introduced 2010 as an upgrade to the HF R series. Discontinued around 2015 (product simplification). Frame rates consisting of 60i, PF30, PF24.

Last models (HF M50/500/52) featured 1/3" CMOS Pro sensor, same as in HF G20 and XA10.

- HF M30 - 8 gig built-in memory, + SDHC slot (Introduced 2010)
- HF M300 - SDHC slot, silver body
- HF M301 - SDHC slot, black body
- HF M31 - 32 gig built-in memory, + SDHC slot
- HF M32 - 64 gig built-in memory, + SDHC/SDXC slot
- HF M40 - 16 gig built-in memory, + SDHC/SDXC slot (Introduced 2011)
- HF M400 - SDHC/SDXC slot
- HF M41 - 32 gig built-in memory, + SDHC/SDXC slot
- HF M50 - 8 gig built-in memory, + SDHC/SDXC slot (Introduced 2012)
- HF M500 - SDHC/SDXC slot
- HF M52 - 32 gig built-in memory, + SDHC/SDXC slot

=== HF S series ===
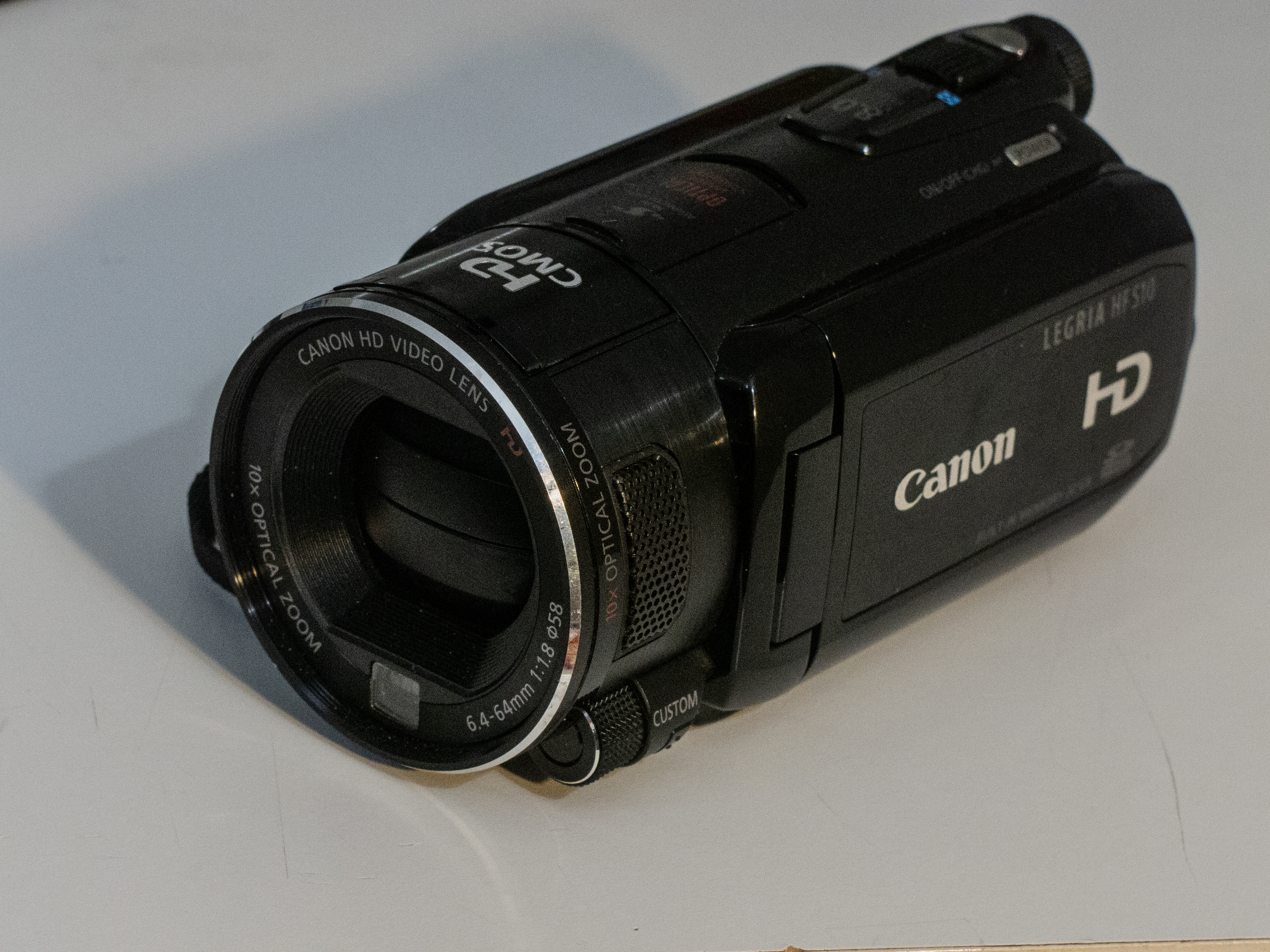
Canon HF S10

Marketed as a "prosumer" camera, some have a built-in LANC jack. 58mm filter ring. Discontinued around 2012 and merged with the HF G series. Sensor is 1/2.6" CMOS 8.5 megapixels.

- HF S10 - 32 gig built-in memory + single SDHC slot (Introduced 2009)
- HF S100 - No built-in memory + single SDHC slot
- HF S11 - 64 gig built-in memory + single SDHC slot
- HF S20 - 32 gig built-in memory + dual SDHC slot, built-in LANC (Introduced 2010)
- HF S200 - No built-in memory + dual SDHC slot, built-in LANC
- HF S21 - 64 gig built-in memory + dual SDHC slot, built-in LANC
- HF S30 - 32 gig built-in memory + dual SDHC/SDXC slot, built-in LANC (Introduced 2011)

=== HF G series ===
Marketed as a better "prosumer" camera with improved optics and sensor to replace HF S series. They have a dual SDHC/SDXC slot, 58mm filter ring, LANC remote jack, clean HDMI output and improved low light performance. The G30 and later dropped the internal 32 GB memory and added MP4 support.

- HF G10 (2011, 1/3" 2.37 Megapixel sensor, 10x zoom) (XA10 adds top handle)
- HF G20 (2013, 1/3" 2.37 Megapixel sensor, 10x zoom)
- HF G25 (2013, PAL version of HF G20)
- HF G30 (2013, 1/2.84" 3.09 Megapixel sensor, 20x zoom) (XA20 adds top handle, XA25 also HD-SDI)
- HF G40 (2016, 1/2.84" 3.09 Megapixel sensor, 20x zoom) (XA30 adds top handle, XA35 also HD-SDI)
- HF G21 (2017, 1/2.84" 3.09 Megapixel sensor, 20x zoom) (XA11 adds top handle, XA15 also HD-SDI)
- HF G26 (2018, PAL version of HF G21)
- HF G50 (2019, 1/2.3" 21.14 Megapixel sensor, 20x zoom, 4K) (XA40 adds top handle, XA45 also HD-SDI)
- HF G60 (2019, 1" 8.29 Megapixel sensor, 15x zoom, 4K) (XA50 adds top handle, XA55 also HD-SDI)
- HF G70 (2022, 1/2.3" 21.14 Megapixel sensor, 20x zoom, 4K) (XA60 adds top handle, XA65 also HD-SDI)
- GX10 (2017, 1” 8.29 Megapixel sensor, 15x zoom, 4K) (XF400 adds top handle, XF405 also HD-SDI)

=== FS Series ===
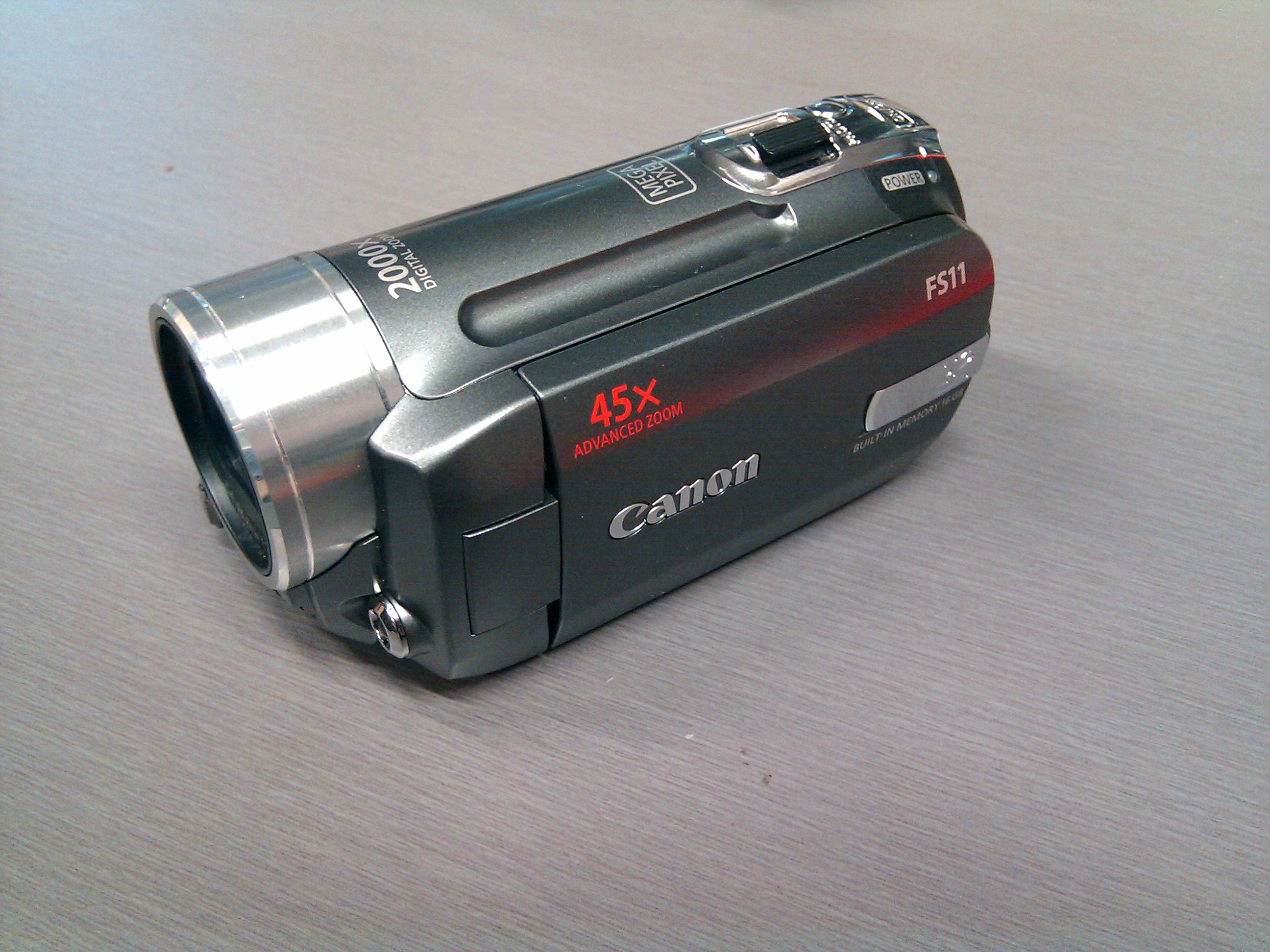
Canon FS11

Canon's only Standard Definition camcorders that record onto SD memory, the FS series ran from 2008 to 2011.

First Generation, 1 megapixel:

- Canon FS100, no onboard memory
- Canon FS10, 8gb
- Canon FS11, 16gb

Second Generation 1 megapixel (except for FS200 which has 0.6 megapixels):

- Canon FS200, no onboard memory
- Canon FS20, 8gb
- Canon FS21, 16gb
- Canon FS22, 32gb, wireless controls

Third Generation:

- North American models (0.6 megapixels):
  - Canon FS300, no onboard memory
  - Canon FS30, 8gb
  - Canon FS31, 16gb
- European models (0.8 megapixels):
  - Canon FS305, no onboard memory
  - Canon FS306, no onboard memory
  - Canon FS307, no onboard memory
  - Canon FS36, 8gb
  - Canon FS37, 16gb

Fourth Generation:

- North American models (0.6 megapixels):
  - Canon FS400, no onboard memory
  - Canon FS40, 8gb
- European models (0.8 megapixels):
  - Canon FS405, no onboard memory
  - Canon FS406, no onboard memory
  - Canon FS46, 8gb

=== DC Series ===
Camcorders designed to record to DVD as a storage device.

- Canon DC310
- Canon DC320
- Canon DC330

=== ZR Series ===
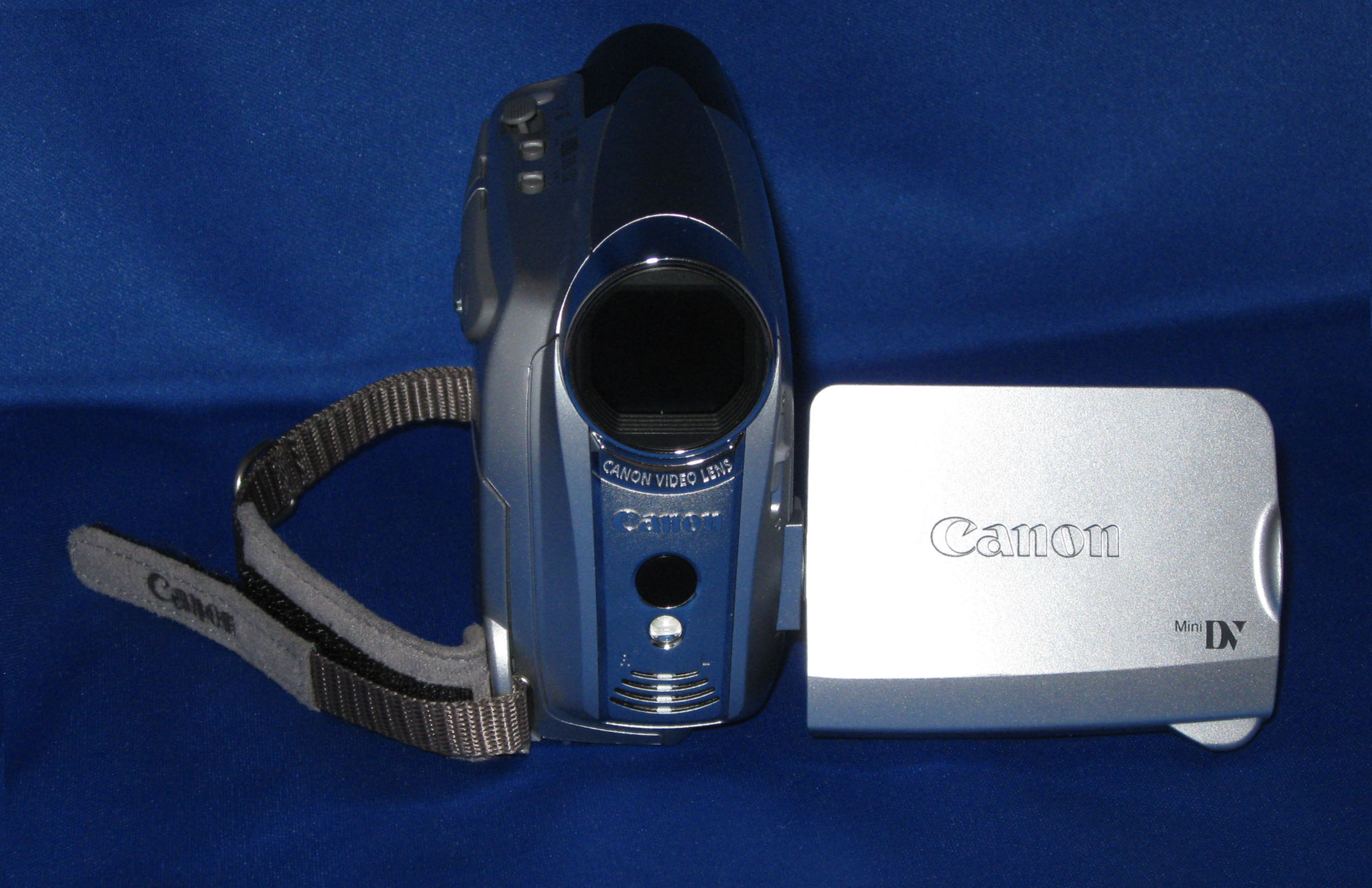
Canon ZR850

Compact Mini-DV camcorders that have a hefty price tag (First Canon ZR was 198,000 yen approx. USD$1900)

- Canon ZR
- Canon ZR10
- Canon ZR20
- Canon ZR25MC
- Canon ZR30MC
- Canon ZR45MC
- Canon ZR50MC
- Canon ZR60
- Canon ZR65MC
- Canon ZR70
- Canon ZR75
- Canon ZR80
- Canon ZR85
- Canon ZR90
- Canon ZR100
- Canon ZR200/ZR300
- Canon ZR400
- Canon ZR500
- Canon ZR600
- Canon ZR800
- Canon ZR830
- Canon ZR850
- Canon ZR900
- Canon ZR930
- Canon ZR950
- Canon ZR960—Canon's last consumer-grade MiniDV camera, introduced in 2009 and still in production as of January 2011

== See also ==
- List of Canon products
