= HDV =

Magnetic tape-based HD videocassette format for camcorders

HDV Mark

HDV is a format for recording of high-definition video on DV videocassette tape. Conceived as an affordable high definition format for digital camcorders, HDV quickly caught on with many amateur and professional videographers due to its low cost, portability, and image quality acceptable for many professional productions. The format was marketed mainly in the mid and late 2000s. HDV and the HDV logo are trademarks of JVC and Sony.

== History ==
The format was originally developed by JVC and supported by Sony, Canon, and Sharp. The four companies formed the HDV Consortium in September 2003.

JVC released its latest HDV camcorder — the GY-HD250 — in 2006. In September 2011 this model was discontinued on the U.S. market. The "B" modification of the older GY-HD200 was released in 2008 and discontinued in November 2009. The latest HDV camcorder made by Canon — the HV40 — was released in 2009, but it traces back to the HV20 developed in 2007, and was phased out of production during 2011, though stocks have lasted through 2012. The latest Sony consumer HDV model is the HDR-HC9, originally released in 2008 and discontinued on the North American market in 2011. 2008 was also the year when Sony presented the latest "advanced amateur" and professional HDV camcorders, namely the HDR-FX1000 and the HVR-Z5.

All the three major manufacturers of HDV equipment — JVC, Canon and Sony — heavily invested in development of MPEG-2 video compression scheme and continued to rely on it in their professional tapeless camcorder lineups: XDCAM HD (Sony), XDCAM EX (Sony and JVC), XDCAM HD422 (Sony), XF Codec (Canon). At the same time Sony, Canon and later JVC joined Panasonic in marketing of AVCHD recording format, which is claimed to deliver visual quality similar to HDV at half the datarate. Consumer high definition camcorders released by these companies since 2009 employ AVCHD format.

In 2010 industry analysts did not expect new HDV products, but believed that manufacturers would continue to support HDV for their existing users, while at the same time transitioning to file-based workflow. When accessed in 2017, the Broadcast & Production Cameras section on Sony's website does not mention HDV technology. The HDV page does not list any equipment or whitepapers.

== Video and audio coding ==
HDV video and audio are encoded in digital form, using lossy inter frame compression. Video is encoded with the H.262/MPEG-2 Part 2 compression scheme, using 8-bit chroma and luma samples with 4:2:0 chroma subsampling. Stereo audio is encoded with the MPEG-1 Layer 2 compression scheme. The compressed audio and video are multiplexed into an MPEG-2 transport stream, which is typically recorded onto magnetic tape, but can also be stored in a computer file.

The data rate for both the audio and video is constant and is roughly the same as DV data rate. The relatively low video data rate can cause bit rate starvation in scenes that have much fine detail, rapid movement or other complex activity like flashing lights, and may result in visible artifacts, such as blockiness and blurring. In contrast to the video, HDV audio bitrate is relatively generous. At the coded bitrate of 384 kbit/s, MPEG-1 Layer 2 audio is regarded as perceptually lossless.

== Recording formats ==
Two major versions of HDV are HDV 720p and HDV 1080i. The former is used by JVC and is informally known as HDV1. The latter is preferred by Sony and Canon and is sometimes referred to as HDV2. The HDV 1080i defines optional progressive recording modes, and in recent publications is sometimes called HDV 1080 or 1080-line HDV as progressive 1080-line recording becomes commonplace.

=== HDV 720p ===
HDV 720p format allows recording high definition video (HDV-HD) as well as progressive-scan standard definition video (HDV-SD).

HDV-HD closely matches broadcast 720p progressive scan video standard in terms of scanning type, frame size, aspect ratio and data rate. Earlier HDV 720p camcorders could shoot only at 24, 25 and 30 frames per second. Later models offer both film-like (24p, 25p, 30p) and reality-like (50p, 60p) frame rates.

HDV-SD is a mode for recording progressive-scan standard definition video. Such a video is sometimes called enhanced definition video (EDTV), but is considered high definition video in Australia. Depending on region, HDV-SD video is recorded either as 576p50 or as 480p60. Like DVCPRO Progressive, HDV-SD was meant as an intermediate format during the transition time from standard definition to high definition video. Later models of HDV 720p camcorders do not record in this mode.

JVC was the only manufacturer of HDV 720p camcorders. JVC was the first to release an HDV camcorder, the handheld GR-HD1. Later JVC shifted its HDV development to shoulder-mounted cameras.

A common misconception is that JVC developed a proprietary extension to HDV called ProHD, featuring film-like 24-frame/s progressive recording mode and LPCM audio, for professional use. JVC has clarified that ProHD is not a video recording format, but "an approach for delivering affordable HD products" and a common name for "bandwidth efficient professional HD models".

=== HDV 1080i ===
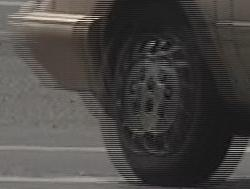
When interlaced video is watched on a progressive monitor without proper deinterlacing, it exhibits combing when there is movement between two fields of one frame.

Sony adapted HDV, originally conceived as progressive-scan format by JVC, to interlaced video. Interlaced video has been a useful compromise for decades due to its ability to display motion smoothly while reducing recording and transmission bandwidth. Interlaced video is still being used in acquisition and broadcast, but interlaced display devices are being phased out. Modern flat-panel television sets that utilize plasma and LCD technology are inherently progressive. All modern computer monitors use progressive scanning as well.

Before interlaced video is displayed on a progressive-scan device it must be converted to progressive using the process known as deinterlacing. Progressive-scan television sets employ built-in deinterlacing circuits to cope with interlaced broadcast signal, but computer video players rarely have this capability (especially modern ones, since progressive video is much more common these days). As such, interlaced video may exhibit ghosting or combing artifacts when watched on a computer.

Some HDV 1080i camcorders are capable of recording progressive video within an interlaced stream, provided that the frame rate does not exceed half of the field rate. The first HDV 1080i camcorder to implement such Progressive Scanning was the Sony HVR-V1. To preserve compatibility with interlaced equipment the HVR-V1 records and outputs video in interlaced form. 25-frame/s and 30-frame/s progressive video is recorded on tape using progressive segmented frame (PsF) technique, while 24-frame/s recording employs 2-3 pulldown. The camcorder offers two variations of 24-frame/s recording: "24" and "24A". In "24" mode the camera ensures that there are no cadence breaks for a whole tape, this mode works better for watching video directly from the camera and for adding "film look" to interlaced video. In the "24A" mode the camera starts every clip on an A frame with timecode set to an even second margin and records the 2-3 pull-down identification data in the HDV stream, so that compatible NLE software knows when to remove the 2-3 pull-down cadences. Several editing tools, including Sony's own Vegas, are capable of processing 24A video as proper 24 frame/s progressive video.

Prior to the HVR-V1, Sony was offering Cineframe, essentially an interlaced-to-progressive converter, to simulate film-like motion. The conversion process involved blending and discarding fields, so vertical resolution of the resulting video suffered. Motion, produced in the 24-frame/s variant of Cineframe was too uneven for professional use. The same or better film look effect can be achieved by converting regular interlaced video into progressive format using computer software.

In 2007 Canon commoditized progressive scanning, releasing the HV20 camcorder. The version for 50 Hz market featured PF25 mode with PsF-like recording, while the version for 60 Hz market had PF24 mode, which utilized 2-3 pulldown scheme. Progressive scan video recorded with the HV20 does not include flags necessary for performing automated film-mode deinterlacing, which is why most editing tools treat such video as interlaced. The HV30, released in 2008, implemented additional PsF-like PF30 mode for 60 Hz markets. Output is performed via component, HDMI and FireWire in interlaced form.

Progressive scan video must be properly deinterlaced to achieve full vertical resolution and to avoid interlace artifacts. 25P and 30P video must be deinterlaced with "weave" or "no deinterlacing" algorithm, which means joining two fields of each frame together into one progressive frame. This operation can be done in most editing tools simply by changing project properties from interlaced to progressive. 24P video must go through film-mode deinterlacing also known as inverse telecine, which throws out judder frames and restores original 24-frame/s progressive video. Many editing tools cannot perform film-mode deinterlacing, requiring usage of a separate converter.

=== HDV 1080p ===
Native Progressive Recording logo (Sony)

Native Progressive logo (Canon)

The original 1080-line HDV specification defined interlaced recording only, which is suitable for television broadcast. As users have become increasingly interested in digital cinematography and in web videos, progressive recording became a necessity. In response to this need, capability for native progressive recording has been added to the 1080i HDV specification. Progressive recording modes are optional for 1080i HDV devices, which means that not every HDV 1080i camcorder or deck is capable of recording or playing back native progressive video. Because the HDV 1080i specification now includes both interlaced and progressive recording modes, in recent publications it is often called HDV 1080 or 1080-line HDV, but the official name still bears the "i" suffix.

HDV camcorders capable of native 1080-line progressive video record it at rates of 23.98 frame/s (commonly referred to as "24p") and 29.97 frame/s ("30p") for 60 Hz markets, and at 25 frame/s ("25p") for 50 Hz markets. Video is output as true progressive video via an i.LINK/FireWire port. Output through other ports is performed in interlaced mode to preserve compatibility with existing interlaced equipment.

The first 1080-line HDV camcorder to offer recording in native progressive format was the Canon XL H1, introduced in 2006. It was followed by the XH-G1 and XH-A1. When shooting in progressive mode, also known as Frame mode, these camcorders generate progressive video from interlaced CCD sensors. Because of row-pair summation, the vertical resolution of progressive video is 10–25% lower than the resolution of interlaced video.

In 2008, Sony released its own models capable of native progressive recording: the HVR-S270, the HVR-Z7 and the HVR-Z5. Sony stressed that the models handle the signal entirely in progressive mode all the way from capture to encoding to recording on tape to output. Sony has designed a Native Progressive Recording logo for the devices that are capable of native progressive recording and playback.

In 2009, Canon released the HV40 HDV camcorder. Its 60 Hz variant, carrying a prominent 24p native progressive mark, became the first consumer HDV model to offer 24-frame/s native progressive recording. Like the aforementioned Sony models, the HV40 uses a true progressive-scan sensor.

Despite differences in branding, native progressive modes offered by Canon and Sony are fully compatible, with both companies adhering to HDV specifications for recording native 1080p video. Other HDV devices capable of reading and recording in native progressive 1080-line format include the Sony HVR-M15AU, HVR-25AU, HVR-M15AE, HVR-25AE and HVR-M35 HDV videocassette recorders, and the 60 Hz Canon HV20/HV30 camcorders when used in tape recorder mode.

== Compatibility ==
Generally, HDV devices are capable of playing and recording in DV format, though this is not required by HDV specification. Many HDV devices manufactured by Sony are capable of playing and recording in DVCAM format. 1080-line devices generally are not compatible with 720-line devices, though some standalone tape decks accept both HDV flavors and play them via their analog outputs. Devices that can play and record native 1080p video can play and record native 1080i video, however the opposite is not always the case.

HDV camcorders are usually offered with either 50 Hz or 60 Hz scanning rate depending on a region. Some models, like Canon XH-A1/G1 and third-generation Sony models such as HVR-S270, HVR-Z5 and HVR-Z7, can be made switchable for "world" capability. Some JVC ProHD products like the GY-HD200UB and GY-HD250U are world-capable out of the box.

HDV is closely related to XDCAM and to TOD families of recording formats, which use the same video encoding — MPEG-2. In particular, HDV 720p is equivalent to 19 Mbit/s XDCAM EX recording mode used in tapeless JVC ProHD camcorders, while HDV 1080i is equivalent to 25 Mbit/s XDCAM HD recording mode and to 1440CBR TOD recording mode.

== Recording media ==
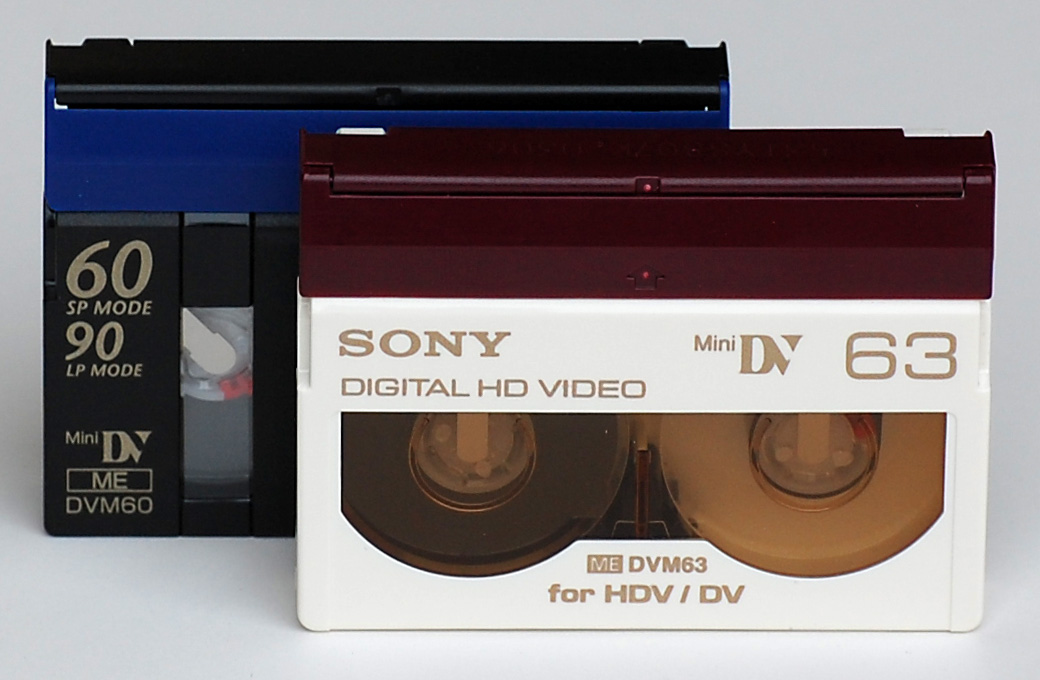
MiniDV cassettes for DV and HDV recording

The HDV Consortium allows using the HDV trademarks only for products that incorporate a tape drive that can record and play video cassette compliant to the HDV format. Therefore, HDV remains a tape-based format. Various solutions for tapeless recording of HDV video that are available on the market are not covered by HDV specification.

=== Magnetic tape ===
Most HDV camcorders use "small" DV cassettes also known as MiniDV cassettes. The Sony HVR-S270 shoulder-mount camcorder is capable of recording both onto "small" and "large" cassettes. Because HDV has the same data rate as DV, recording time is the same as DV Standard Play. Unlike DV, HDV does not offer Long Play speed.

A standard MiniDV cassette provides one hour of recording. By using cassettes with longer and thinner tape it is possible to record up to 80 minutes onto one MiniDV cassette, though usage of such tape is not recommended. A large DV cassette loaded with longer tape can deliver up to 4.5 hours of recording time.

Tape manufacturers also offer MiniDV cassettes specifically for HDV recording. Such cassettes have the same Metal Evaporate (ME) formulation as normal DV cassettes, but are claimed to have reduced drop-out rate compared to standard DV cassettes. Usage of such cassettes is not required by HDV specification.

=== File-based media ===
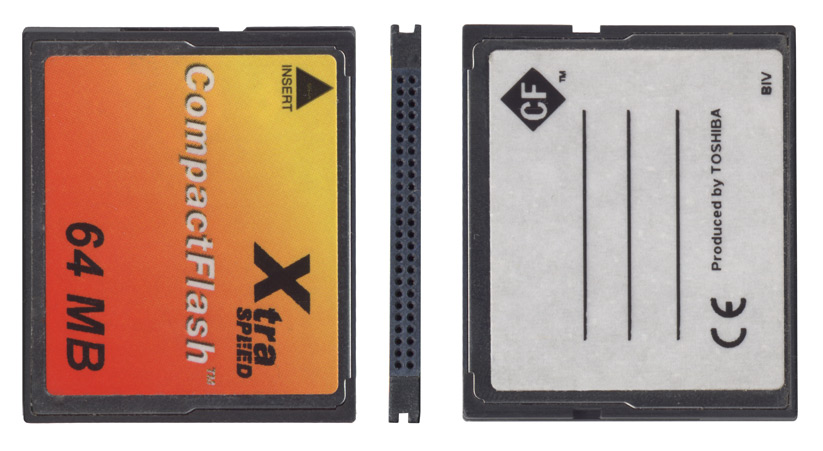
Type I CompactFlash card

Since HDV had been introduced, tapeless — or file-based — video recording formats such as DVCPRO P2, XDCAM and AVCHD have gained broad acceptance. The trend towards tapeless workflow accelerated with increased capacity and reduced cost of non-linear media like hard disk drives (HDD), optical discs and solid-state memory.

Recognizing the need for faster workflow, JVC, Sony and other manufacturers offer on-camera recording units, which convert an HDV camcorder into a hybrid system capable of recording both onto tape and onto file-based media. These recorders connect to a camcorder via FireWire and do not recompress HDV video, offering exactly the same image quality as if video were recorded on tape.

JVC offers two FireStore recorders made by Focus Enhancements: the HDD-based DR-HD100 and MR-HD100 on-camera recorders; it also offers the SxS-based KA-MR100G recorder. Canon offers Focus Enhancements FS-CF and FS-CF Pro models, which record onto CompactFlash memory cards. Sony offers the HDD-based HVR-DR60 and the CompactFlash-based HVR-MRC1K recorders.

Recording time depends on capacity of media used. In particular, a 32 GB CompactFlash card is good for 144 minutes of HDV video. The HVR-DR60 can fit over two hours of high definition video, while the FireStore models with 100 GB disk drive can store almost four hours of footage. File-based recorders are invaluable for continuous recording that extends one hour.

== Use in broadcast television ==
HDV is accepted for broadcast TV use with varying restrictions.

Discovery Channel chose HDV handhelds for shooting Deadliest Catch despite their reduced light sensitivity and a large depth of focus, because smaller cameras were better for crew safety and they destroy several dozen cameras per series. HDV camcorders were also used for shooting MythBusters.

In 2006 KRON San Francisco purchased 52 Sony HVR-Z1U HDV camcorders. According to chief engineer Craig Porter, the cameras proved reliable. The station formed a group of "video journalists" or "one-man bands", who would use a Z1 camcorder, Toughbook laptop and Edius editing software to report, shoot and edit their own stories. After the station was moved to smaller cameras, it became possible for the journalists to travel in compact cars, which were 10 to 15 times cheaper than traditional large ENG vans.

In February 2009 ITV News bought 68 Sony HVR-Z5E handheld camcorders for its multi-skilling journalists. The camcorders, which come with non-removable 20x lens and outfitted with CompactFlash recorders became popular among journalists who are not trained camera operators.

In the TV series JAG made for CBS, handheld HDV camcorders were used for scenes where larger HD cameras would have been impractical.

The BBC does not consider HDV to meet HD broadcast standards, therefore acceptability of HDV footage for HD programming is limited to 25% of the program's total duration.

The Discovery HD Theater accepted content sourced from 1080-line HDV camcorders, but limited it to 15% of a whole program. Producers wishing to use HDV were required to submit an approved postproduction path outlining their handling of the footage in the editing process. The Discovery Channel HD simulcast had fewer or no guidelines and accepted a mix of XDCAM HD, HDV and AVCHD for the length of a program. For example, Discovery Channel aired 911: The Bronx, a six-episode reality series set in a hospital and shot with HDV cameras. Several episodes of Survivorman were shot with the Sony HVR-Z1U and HDR-HC3 camcorders.

The Discovery Channel International used rating system that defines Gold, Silver and Bronze acquisition and delivery levels. Depending on particular camera make and model and on post-production process, HDV footage could be rated as Silver HD, Bronze HD, or widescreen SD. In particular, some users considered Canon HDV camcorders to deliver the best-looking image with the least amount of compression artifacts among the models having 25 Mbit/s MPEG-2 HD codec.

The PBS accepts HDV for widescreen programming acquisition and to a limited extent for use in HD programs. PBS may allow usage of "less than full broadcast quality equipment" if compression artifacts are "not obvious when viewed on an HDTV monitor". For example, the Art Wolfe's TV series Travels to the Edge was produced for PBS in HDV format using Canon XL-H1 camcorders.

The Travel Channel HD eagerly accepts HDV footage. For example, Sony HDV camcorders were used for production of highly acclaimed Anthony Bourdain's No Reservations program, among other cameras. Bizarre Foods with Andrew Zimmern and its follow-up Bizarre World are shot with Sony HDV cameras as well. Madventures was shot with the Sony EX1 XDCAM EX camera paired with the Sony HVR-A1U HDV camcorder.

Current TV used Sony HDV camcorders to shoot episodes for Vanguard TV series.

Guiding Light, the longest-running soap opera in production in television and radio history, broke away from traditional three-sided sets and pedestal-style cameras in 2008, choosing the handheld Canon XH-G1 in standard definition mode for shooting on practical locations until the show was canceled in 2009.

== Editing ==
Because HDV video is recorded in digital form, original content can be copied onto another tape or captured to a computer for editing without quality degradation. Depending on capturing software and computer's file system, either a whole tape is captured into one contiguous file, or the video is split in smaller 4 GB or 2 GB segments, or a separate file is created for each take. The way files are named depends on capturing software. Some systems convert HDV video into proprietary intermediate format on the fly while capturing, so original format is not preserved.

HDV footage can be natively edited by most non-linear editors, with real-time playback being possible on modern mainstream personal computers. Slower computers may exhibit reduced performance compared to other formats such as DV because of high resolution and interframe compression of HDV video.

Editing performance can be improved by converting HDV to intermediate format prior to editing. These include various Cineform products, Edius HQ, Avid DNxHD, Apple Intermediate Codec and Apple ProRes 422, among others. Usage of an intermediate codec adds one more generation to the video, potentially degrading its quality. On another hand, an intermediate codec can reduce blockiness and fix other issues in the original video, like interlaced chroma in progressive recordings.

Depending on the non-linear editing system (NLE), it is possible to minimize generation losses by editing native HDV video using straight cuts only, with no effects, and rendering back to HDV. Up to 15 frames per each cut may be re-encoded because of the long-GOP nature of HDV video.

== Distributing ==
HDV video can be recorded or printed back to tape. Such tapes are often accepted by local television stations, though many organizations prefer the submissions to be delivered in higher-end format like Digital Betacam, HDCAM or D5 HD. It is also possible to record M2TS file to any media that offers enough capacity, like a DVD, external HDD drive or a memory card.

For consumer use, HDV-sourced video can be delivered on a Blu-ray Disc without re-encoding, can be converted to AVCHD and delivered on an AVCHD disc, or can be downconverted to DVD-Video.

== Products ==
=== Canon ===
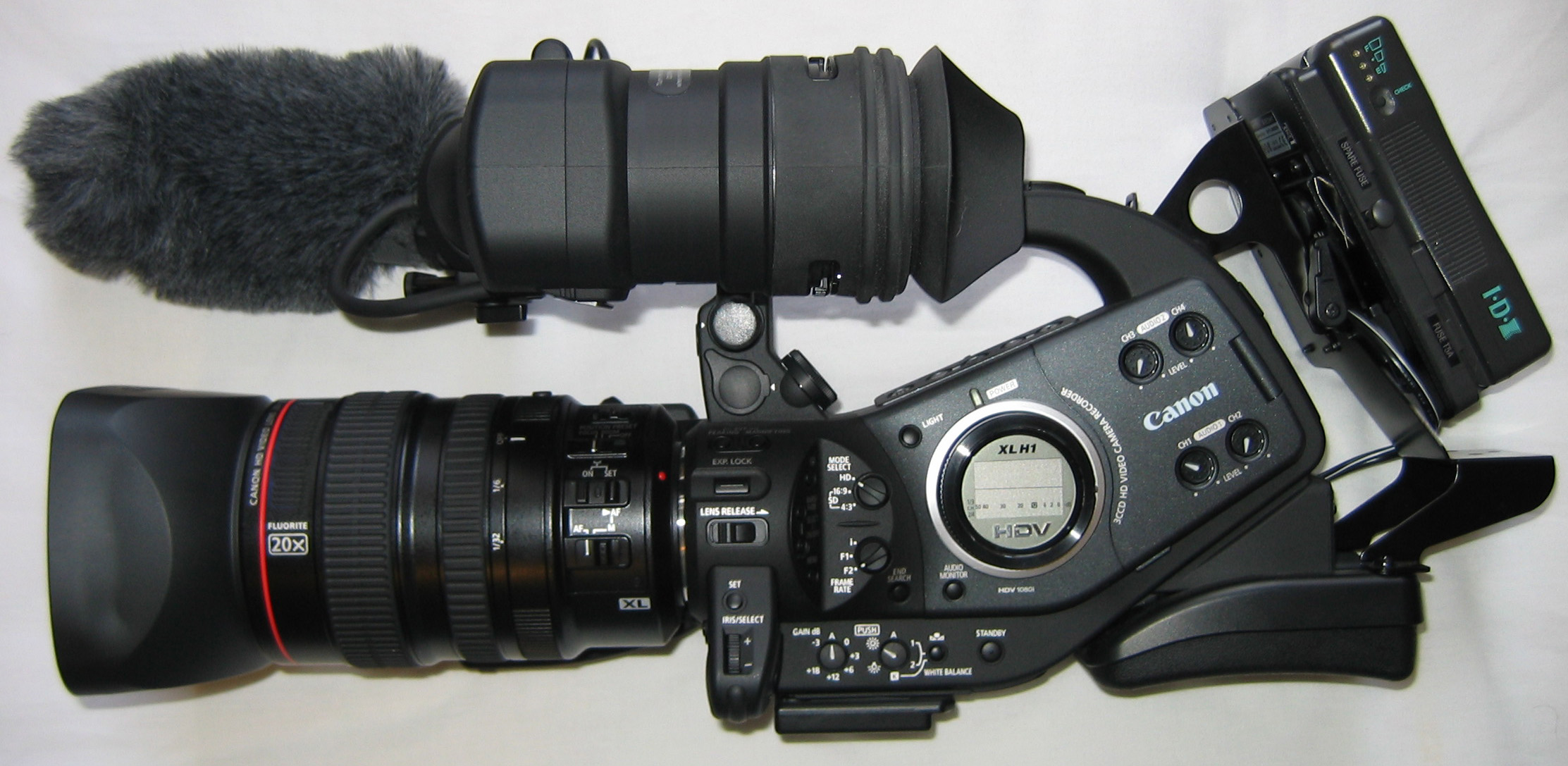
Canon XL-H1

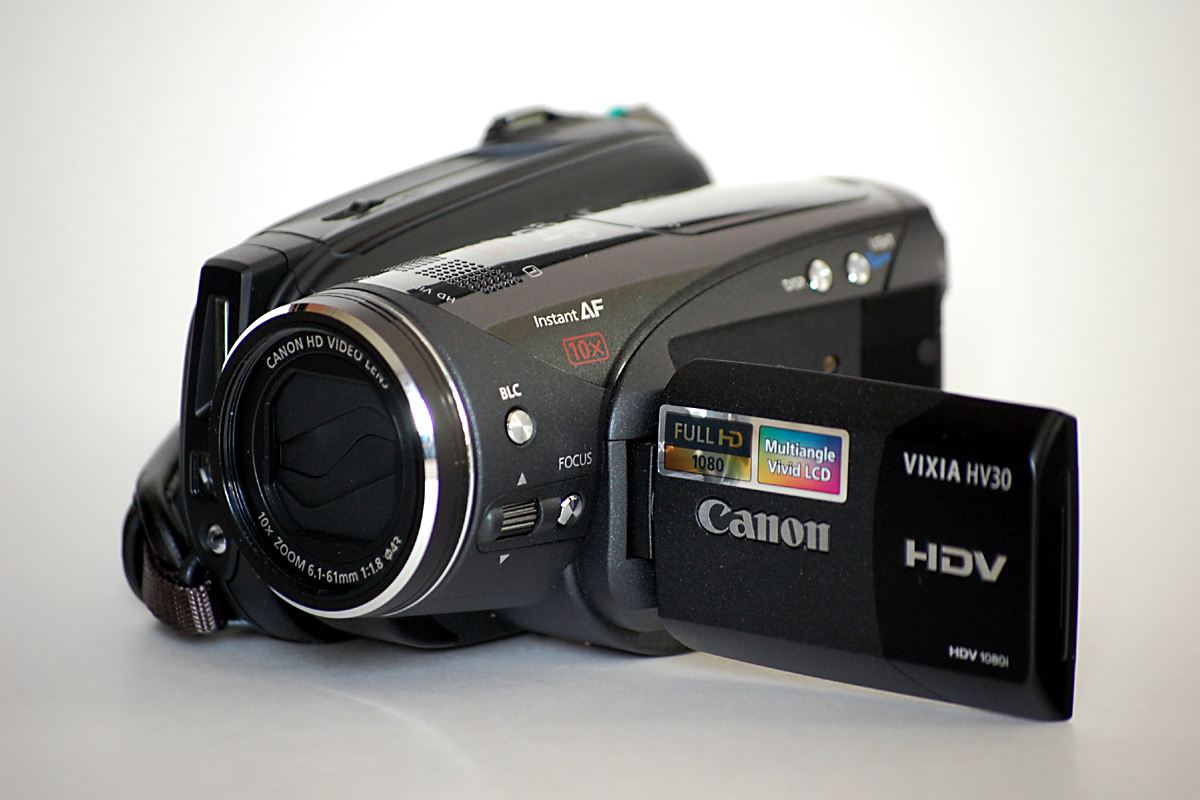
Canon HV30

Canon entered the HDV market in September 2005, with the Canon XL H1, a professional-oriented modular camera system with interchangeable lenses, HD-SDI output, and three 1440 × 1080 ⅓" CCDs. This was the first HDV camcorder to allow 1080-line native progressive recording.

In July 2006, Canon announced the handheld XH A1/XH G1 models, which use the same sensor as the XL-H1. Both models share the same body and most of the features, with the XH G1 geared towards professional multi-camera production and including connections for HD-SDI/SD-SDI Out, genlock, and time code.

Later in the same year, Canon introduced the consumer-oriented Canon HV10, a compact unit with a single 2.76 megapixel CMOS sensor. The camera recorded interlaced video only.

In April 2007 Canon released the HV20 which used the same sensor and internal processor as the HV10, had a larger lens and more conventional layout. This was the first consumer HDV camcorder that featured progressive shooting modes in addition to native interlaced recording. Progressive-scan video was recorded within interlaced container to remain compatible with consumer level editing suites. The version for 50 Hz market offered PF25 mode, which utilized Progressive segmented Frame technique, while the 60 Hz variant featured PF24 mode, which utilized 2-3 pulldown scheme.

The HV30, released in 2008, was a minor update of the HV20. The body color has been changed from silver to black, the LCD screen has been improved, and the 60 Hz variant implemented PsF-like PF30 mode.

In 2009 Canon released the HV40. Its 50 Hz variant was practically identical to the HV30, while the 60 Hz variant became the first consumer HDV camcorder capable of native progressive 24 frames/s recording.

=== JVC ===
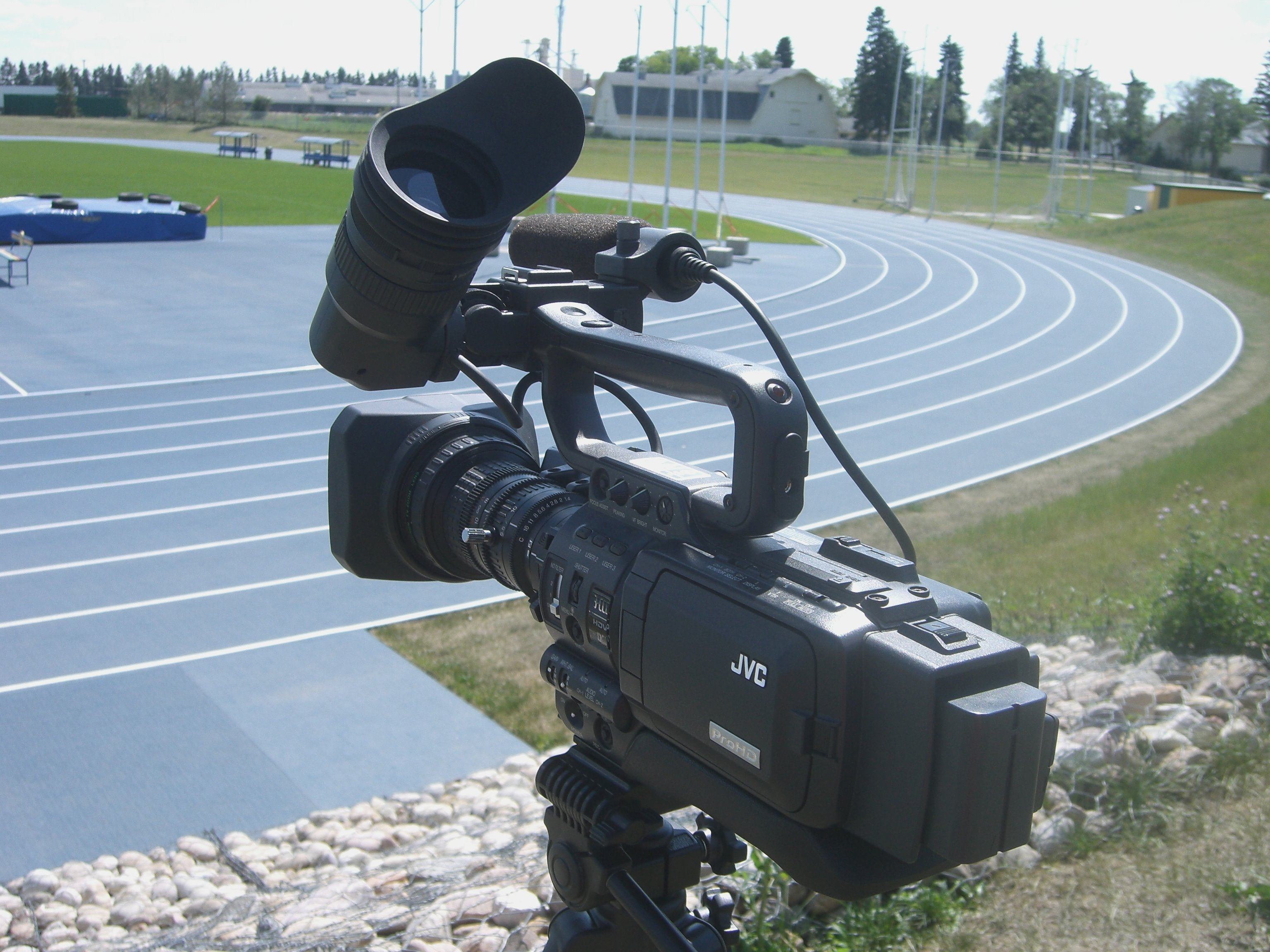
JVC GY-HD100

In 2003 JVC released the first HDV camcorder — the handheld GR-HD1. The camcorder offered standard DV recording mode, HDV 720p30 and HDV 480p60. The HDV modes used the older Rec. 601 standard for color space, rather than the newer Rec. 709 standard intended for high-definition video. The imager of the GR-HD1 used a single 1/3" CCD sensor instead of a 3CCD setup, another unusual choice discouraging professional use. The GR-HD1 was not popular in either the consumer or semi-professional market, and JVC later shifted its HDV development to professional shoulder-mounted cameras.

The shoulder mount GY-HD100 camcorder was released in 2005 and featured 3CCD imaging system with native 720p resolution, interchangeable lens and 24 frame/s recording. Because of the latter feature this camcorder became popular for shooting "digital movies". The updated version, GY-HD110, provides several updates and fixed split-screen effect found on some GY-HD100 cameras.

The GY-HD200, released later, offered 50p/60p recording, 720p-to-1080i converter and Anton Bauer professional battery with mount.

In 2006 JVC released the GY-HD250, which simplified multi-camera recording by providing genlock and time code input/output. HD/SD-SDI output allowed to record uncompressed video.

In 2008 the "B" modification of the GY-HD200 was released, allowing live recording of either 720p or 1080i signal onto an external tapeless recorder. Recording to tape was still performed in 720p mode only.

=== Sharp ===
Sharp is the only member of the HDV Consortium that has not produced an HDV camcorder or a videocassette recorder. The closest Sharp has ever got in supporting HDV standard is the AQUOS DV-ACV52 digital video player. The player supports HDV video, though it does not have a tape transport. Instead, it allows playback and dubbing of DV/HDV video from a camcorder connected to the player via a FireWire connector.

=== Sony ===
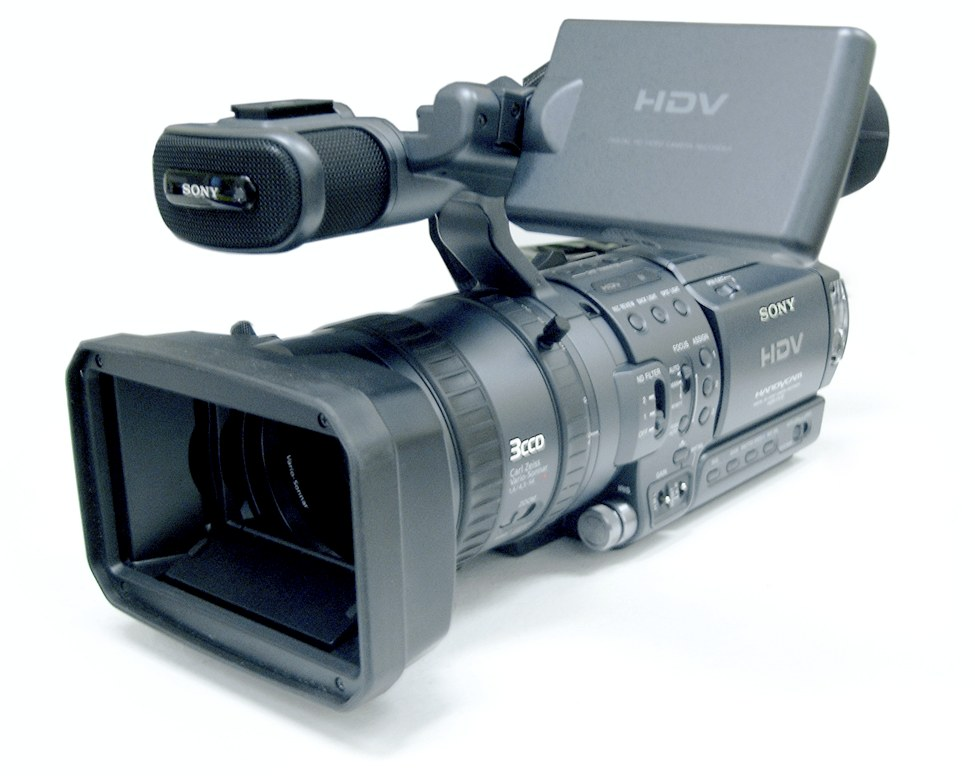
Sony HDR-FX1

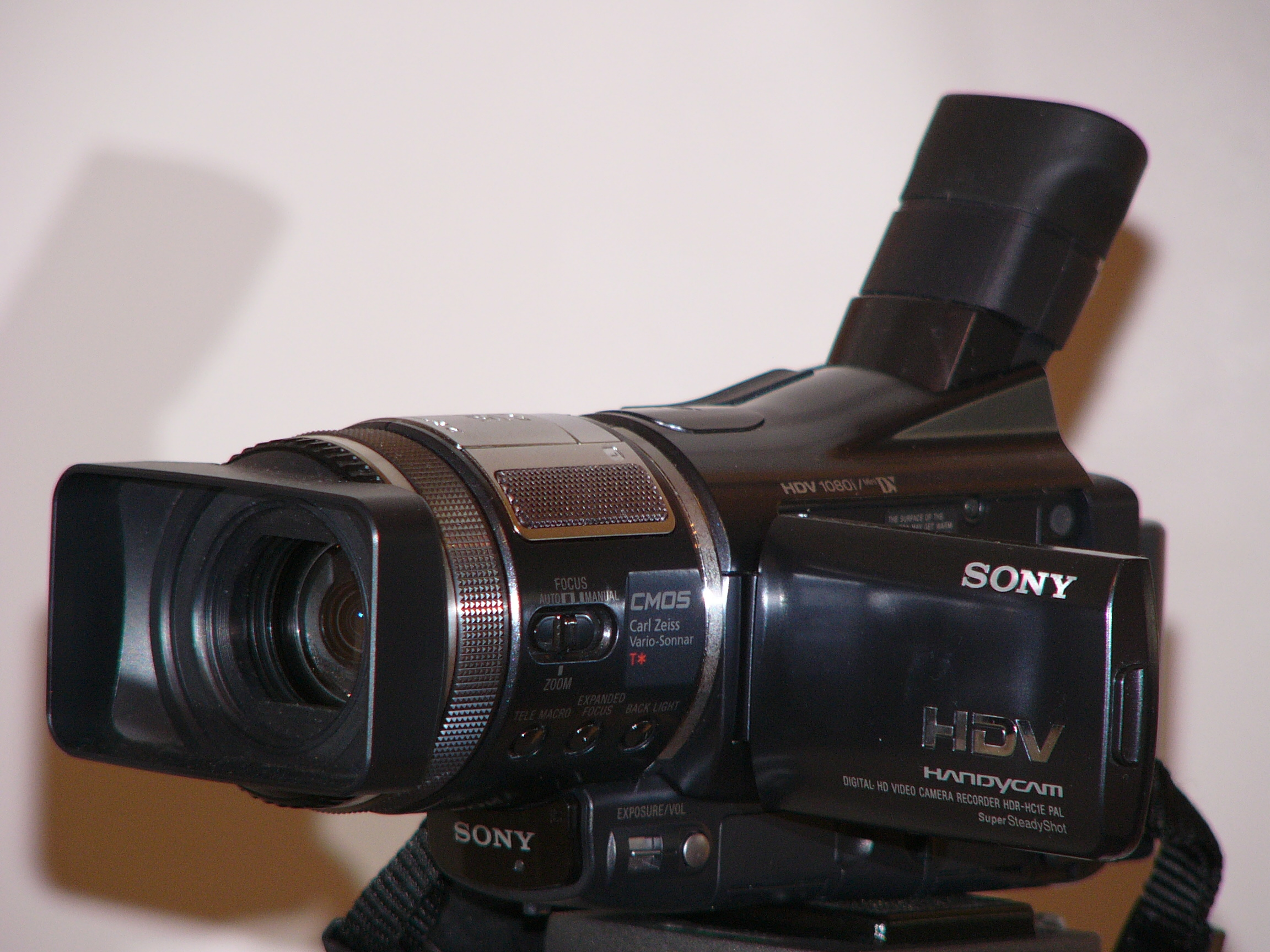
Sony HDR-HC1

Sony specializes in 1080i HDV equipment and makes products for both 60 Hz and 50 Hz markets. Traditionally, Sony uses suffixes "E" and "P" to identify 50 Hz models, and suffix "U" or no suffix at all to identify 60 Hz models. Models listed below are specified without suffixes.

In September 2004 Sony released the first HDV 1080i camcorder, the HDR-FX1. Its professional version, the HVR-Z1, came with XLR audio inputs and 44 additional features. Most notably, the HVR-Z1 was switchable between 50 Hz and 60 Hz scanning to cater for the different scanning rates used in different markets.

In the middle of 2005 Sony released its first consumer HDV model, the HDR-HC1, which had a single CMOS sensor, electronic stabilization system and was capable of recording in DV and HDV 1080i modes. Its professional version, the HVR-A1, added a second accessory shoe in place of the flash, XLR audio inputs, additional recording options, larger eyecup and larger lens hood.

In 2006 Sony replaced the HDR-HC1 with the smaller and cheaper HDR-HC3, which featured an incrementally improved CMOS chip, but omitted some features of its predecessor. The HDR-HC3 was replaced by the HDR-HC5 which used the same CMOS chip as the HDR-HC3, and added an option of recording in xvYCC color space. The replacement model, the HDR-HC7 came with a higher pixel count CMOS sensor and with a microphone input. Like the HDR-HC5, the HDR-HC7 could also record xvYCC. In 2008 the HDR-HC7 was replaced with the HDR-HC9.

In 2006, Sony added two new models to its upscale HDV lineup: the "advanced amateur" HDR-FX7 and its professional cousin, the HVR-V1. The progressive-scan CMOS sensors of these models resolve full 1080 lines of vertical resolution. The HDR-FX7 records interlaced video only, while the HVR-V1 offers the choice of shooting interlaced or progressive video. Progressive video is converted to interlaced using pulldown for recording onto tape.

In August 2007, Sony introduced the shoulder-mounted version of the HDR-HC7, the HVR-HD1000.

In November 2007, Sony announced the HVR-Z7 handheld camcorder and the HVR-S270 shoulder-mounted camera. Both use the same three 1/3" ClearVid CMOS sensors and attain light sensitivity similar to that of the venerable DSR-PD170 while offering HDV recording in native interlaced, progressive scan and native progressive modes. The Z7 has 2 XLR audio inputs and HDMI output while the S270 has 4 XLR inputs and features HD-SDI output. Presently the HVR-S270 is the only HDV camcorder capable of recording onto full-size DV cassettes.

In 2008 the HDR-FX1 and the HVR-Z1 were replaced with the HDR-FX1000 and the HVR-Z5, respectively. The major changes include utilizing CMOS sensors instead of CCD, and progressive mode shooting. The FX1000 records progressive scan video using pulldown, while HVR-Z5 offers native progressive recording.

In November 2008 Sony restarted production of the HDR-FX7 camcorder, which had been discontinued a year earlier. Offered for almost half the original price, the HDR-FX7 bridged the gap between the HDR-HC9 and the FX1000.

In summer 2009 Sony discontinued the HDR-HC9 on the North American market, but restarted its sales in spring 2010, this time advertising it not as an HDV camcorder, but as a MiniDV HD camcorder. MiniDV HD has never been officially presented as an alternative name for HDV. The other competing HD recording standard that uses DV cassettes is DVCPRO HD. In spring 2011 the HDR-HC9 is no longer available for purchase from the Sony's North American online store. Sony released Digital Master Magnetic Storage Tape (PHDVM)"Sony Digital-Master Tape". made to be higher quality with less errors and fewer drops HDV format made for their professional line.

== Specifications ==
Format name	HDV 720p	HDV 1080i	
Media	"Small" or "Large" DV cassette		
Video
Frame aspect ratio	16x9		
Frame size in pixels	1280 × 720	1440 × 1080	
Pixel aspect ratio	1.0	1.33	
Scanning type	progressive	interlaced	progressive (optional)
Video signal	720p/60, 720p/30, 720p/24, 720p/50, 720p/25,	1080i/30 (29.97), 1080i/25	1080p/30 (29.97), 1080p/24 (23.98), 1080p/25
Video Compression	MPEG2 Video (profile & level: MP@H-14/HL)	MPEG2 Video (profile & level: MP@H-14)	
Sampling frequency for luminance	74.25 MHz	55.6875 MHz	
Chroma sampling format	4:2:0		
Quantization	8 bits (both luminance and chrominance)		
Compressed video bitstream rate	~18.3 Mbit/s	~25 Mbit/s	
Audio
Compression	MPEG-1 Audio Layer II, PCM	MPEG-1 Audio Layer II	
Sampling frequency	48 kHz		
Quantization	16 bits		
Audio modes and data rate	MPEG-1 Part 3 AL 2 Stereo (2-channel) at 384 kbit/s (192 kbit/s per channel); optional MPEG-2 Part 3 AL 2 4-channel at 96 kbit/s per channel.		
System
Stream type	MPEG transport stream (MPEG-TS)		
Stream interface	IEEE 1394 in alpha mode (also known as FireWire 400 or i. LINK)		
File extension	.m2t (generally)		

== See also ==
- Digital cinematography
- Filmizing
- Non-linear video editing
- Sony HDVS, an early HDTV format
