= Canon HF S10 =

Camcorder

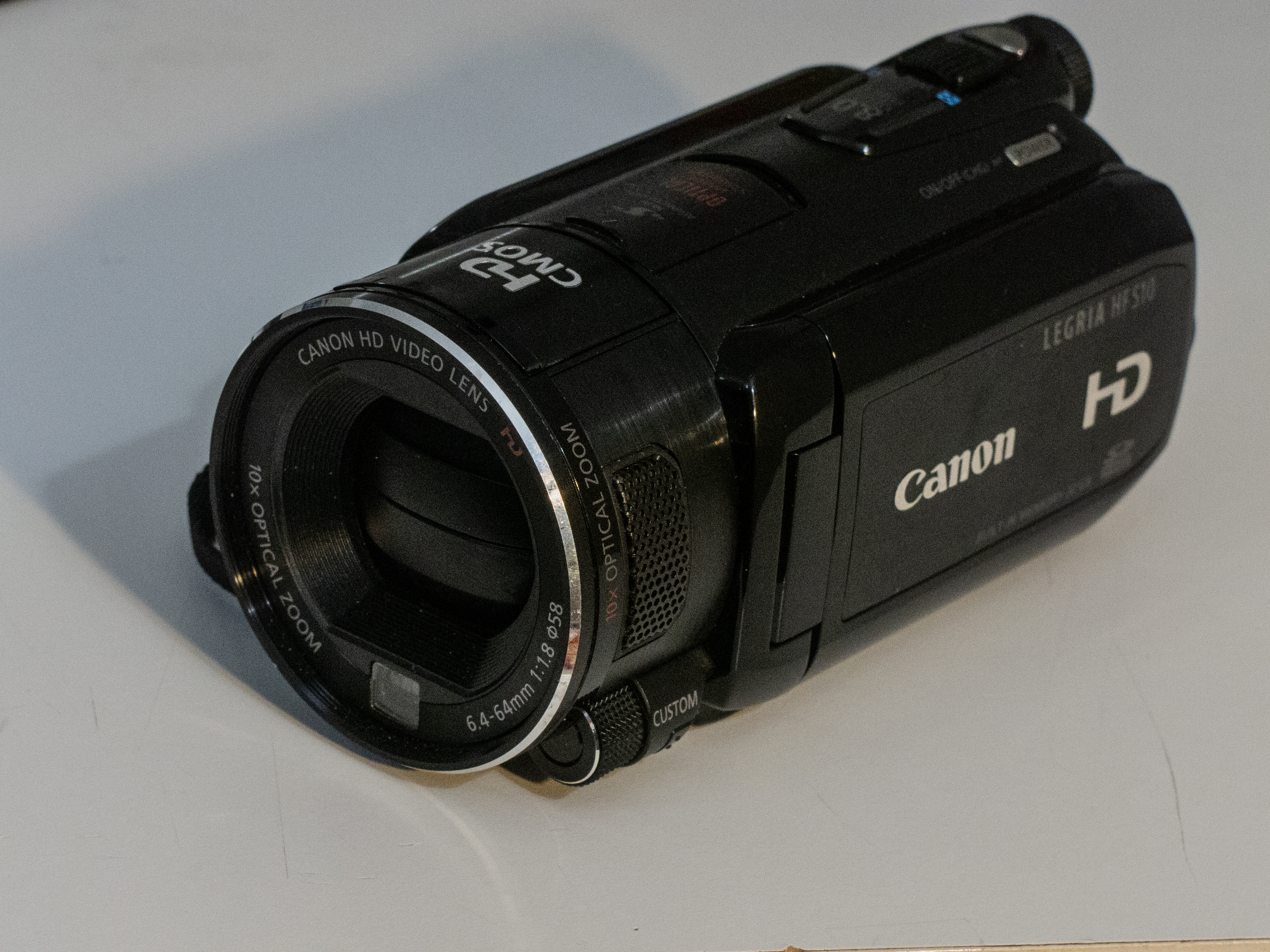
- A Canon HF S10 (Legria; PAL)

Overview
- Type: Prosumer camcorder

Sensor/medium
- Sensor type: CMOS
- Sensor size: 1/2.6in
- Maximum resolution: 1080p/1080i 8.59 megapixels
- Storage media: SDHC cards Internal memory (32GB)

Shutter
- Frame rate: 1080p (PF24/PF25); 1080i (50i/60i)

General
- Video recording: MXP(24 Mbps); FXP (17 Mbps); XP+ (12 Mbps); SP (7 Mbps); LP (5 Mbps)
- Weight: 450g (w/o battery); 500g (w/battery)

The HF S10 is a camcorder released by Canon in February 2009.

== Camera ==
This is the first camcorder in Canon's HF S lineup. It supersedes the Canon HF 11 and is succeeded by the Canon HF S11. It has a new video snapshot mode, and an improved UI. Also onboard is an enhanced Digic DV III processor.

== Specifications ==
- 8.59 megapixels CMOS sensor
- DIGIC DV III processor
- AVCHD progressive/interlaced
- Up to 1080i at 50 fps/60 fps and 1080p at 24 fps/25 fps
- Includes BP-807 battery, upgradeable to BP-819 or BP-827
- Released: February 2009
- Price: approx. $2500 AUD
