= List of films shot on digital video prior to 2012 =

Since the 1990s, more and more films have been shot on digital video and videotape rather than film stock. Some of them are independent, low-budget productions, while others are major studio productions. Since the mid-2010s, most films have been captured and distributed digitally. Among the 200 highest grossing theatrically released films each year, a majority of films were shot on digital video for the first time in 2013, in 2014 over 80% were shot digitally, and by 2016 over 90% of films were shot digitally.

== Notable firsts ==
- First major studio film shot primarily on digital video: Star Wars: Episode II – Attack of the Clones (2002)
- First film shot digitally in Official Competition at Cannes Film Festival: Russian Ark (2002)
- First nominees for the Academy Award for Best Cinematography shot mainly on digital video: The Curious Case of Benjamin Button and Slumdog Millionaire (2008)
- First winner of the Academy Award for Best Cinematography shot mainly on digital video: Slumdog Millionaire (2008)
- First winner of the Academy Award for Best Cinematography shot entirely on digital video: Avatar (2009)
- First film shot with the Red One Camera: Che (2008)
- First film shot with the Red One MX, and first film projected in 4K theatrical distribution: The Social Network (2010)
- First film to be shot mainly with the Arri Alexa: Anonymous (2011)
- First film to be shot mainly with the Red Epic Dragon and in 6K resolution: Gone Girl (2014)
- First film shot mainly with the Arri Alexa 65: The Revenant (2015)
- First film shot mainly with digital IMAX cameras: Avengers: Infinity War (2018) and Avengers: Endgame (2019)
- First film shot mainly with the Red Weapon Vista Vision and in 8K resolution: Guardians of the Galaxy Vol. 2 (2017)

== List of films ==
The movies listed are shot mainly digitally. The list includes films released before 2012.

Year	Title	Cinematographer	Camera type	Lens type	Notes
2011	Setup	Mike Gunther	Red One		
2011	Catch .44	Aaron Harvey	Red One MX	Hawk V-Lite; V-Plus Lenses	
2011	Albert Nobbs	Michael McDonough	Red One MX		
2011	Extremely Loud and Incredibly Close	Chris Menges	Arri Alexa		
2011	11-11-11	Joseph White	Arri Alexa		
2011	The Wholly Family	Nicola Pecorini	Arri Alexa		
2011	Once Upon a Time in Anatolia	Gökhan Tiryaki	Sony CineAlta F35		
2011	Wild Bill	George Richmond	Arri Alexa		
2011	Twixt	Mihai Mălaimare Jr.	Sony HDW-F900		Also shot using Red digital cameras
2011	This Is 40	Phedon Papamichael	Arri Alexa		
2011	The Girl With the Dragon Tattoo	Jeff Cronenweth	Red One MX, Red Epic MX	Zeiss Master Prime	Red Epic was used to shoot scenes in both the US and Sweden. The film was also the first to employ a workflow higher than 4K resolution from production to presentation.
2011	The Darkest Hour	Scott Kevan	Sony CineAlta F35		
2011	Final Destination 5	Brian Pearson	Arri Alexa		
2011	Young Adult	Eric Steelberg	Arri Alexa		
2011	The Muppets	Don Burgess	Red One MX, Red Epic MX	Zeiss Ultra Prime	
2011	Hugo	Robert Richardson	Arri Alexa		Winner of the 2011 Academy Award for Best Cinematography
2011	Immortals	Brendan Galvin	Panavision Genesis		
2011	Jack and Jill	Dean Cundey	Arri Alexa	Cooke S4	
2011	A Very Harold & Kumar 3D Christmas	Michael Barrett	Panavision Genesis		
2011	The Three Musketeers	Glen MacPherson	Arri Alexa		
2011	Vicky and the Treasure of the Gods	Christian Rein	Arri Alexa		
2011	Rampart	Bobby Bukowski	Arri Alexa		
2011	Killer Joe	Caleb Deschanel	Arri Alexa		
2011	Headshot	Chankit Chamnivikaipong	Red One MX		
2011	Dolphin Tale	Karl Walter Lindenlaub	Red One MX		
2011	Our Idiot Brother	Yaron Orbach	Red One MX		
2011	Anonymous	Anna Foerster	Arri Alexa		The first feature-length film to be shot with Alexa
2011	Contagion	Steven Soderbergh	Red One MX	Red Pro Prime	
2011	Margin Call	Frank DeMarco	Red One MX		
2011	The Inbetweeners Movie	Ben Wheeler	Arri Alexa		
2011	The Devil's Double	Sam McCurdy	Red One MX		
2011	Drive	Newton Thomas Sigel	Arri Alexa		
2011	In Time	Roger Deakins	Arri Alexa		
2011	Captain America: The First Avenger	Shelly Johnson	Panavision Genesis		Underwater sequences and epilogue shot with Arri Alexa
2011	Zookeeper	Michael Barrett	Panavision Genesis		
2011	Horrible Bosses	David Hennings	Panavision Genesis		
2011	Bucky Larson: Born to Be a Star	Michael Barrett	Panavision Genesis		
2011	Bellflower	Joel Hodge	Custom based on Silicon Imaging SI-2K		
2011	Melancholia	Manuel Alberto Claro	Arri Alexa		Phantom HD Camera used for high-speed photography
2011	Mr. Popper's Penguins	Florian Ballhaus	Arri Alexa		
2011	Transformers: Dark of the Moon	Amir Mokri	Sony CineAlta F35		Most non-action scenes/close-ups shot with 35mm film
2011	Return of the Moonwalker	Mike Maria	Red Epic MX		
2011	Pina	Hélène Louvart; Jörg Widmer	Sony HDC-1500		
2011	Pirates of the Caribbean: On Stranger Tides	Dariusz Wolski	Red One MX		
2011	Prom	Byron Shah	Arri Alexa		
2011	TT3D: Closer to the Edge	Thomas Kürzl	Red One MX		
2011	The Lincoln Lawyer	Lukas Ettlin	Red One MX		
2011	Shark Night 3D	Gary Capo	Fusion Camera System, Sony CineAlta F35		
2011	Sanctum	Jules O'Loughlin	Fusion Camera System		
2011	Drive Angry	Brian Pearson	Red One MX, Silicon Imaging SI-2K		
2011	Cedar Rapids	Chuy Chávez	Arriflex D-21		
2011	Like Crazy	John Guleserian	Canon EOS 7D		
2011	The Future	Nikolai von Graevenitz	Red One M		
2011	Sick Boy	Sean C. Cunningham	Canon EOS 7D		Canon EOS L-Series lenses, StickyPod, Redrock Micro "Captain Stubling" rig and Lensbaby Muse
2011	Sound of My Voice	Rachel Morrison	Canon EOS 7D		
2010	Tron: Legacy	Claudio Miranda	Sony CineAlta F35		Phantom HD Camera used for high-speed photography
2010	Blue Valentine	Andrij Parekh	Red One M	Cooke S4	Present-day scenes shot on Red, flashback scenes shot on 16mm
2010	Red State	David Klein	Red One MX, Canon EOS 7D		Canon 7D used only for 'running with camera' shots
2010	Winter's Bone	Michael McDonough	Red One M	Zeiss Master Prime	
2010	Sarah's Key	Pascal Ridao	Red One M	Cooke S4	
2010	Jackass 3D	Dimitry Elyashkevich	Red One M		
2010	Hubble 3D	James Neihouse	IMAX Cargo Bay 3-D Camera		
2010	The Devil's Rock	Paul Campion	Red One M		
2010	Fair Game	Doug Liman	Red One M		
2010	Resident Evil: Afterlife	Glen MacPherson	Fusion Camera System		
2010	The Social Network	Jeff Cronenweth	Red One MX	Zeiss Master Prime	First film to feature a 2K pipeline, from production to presentation.
2010	127 Hours	Anthony Dod Mantle; Enrique Chediak	Canon EOS 5D Mark II, Canon EOS 7D, Silicon Imaging SI-2K		
2010	Machete	Jimmy Lindsey	Panavision Genesis		
2010	Certified Copy	Luca Bigazzi	Red One M		
2010	Casino Jack	Adam Swica	Red One M		
2010	Date Night	Dean Semler	Panavision Genesis		
2010	The Chronicles of Narnia: The Voyage of the Dawn Treader	Dante Spinotti	Sony CineAlta F23		
2010	Rosario	Carlo Mendoza	Arri Alexa		First Filipino film to be shot with the Arri Alexa
2010	Yogi Bear	Peter James	Fusion Camera System		
2010	Step Up 3D	Ken Seng	Fusion Camera System		
2010	Death at a Funeral	Rogier Stoffers	Panavision Genesis		
2010	Film Socialisme	Fabrice Aragno; Paul Grivas	Sony PMW-EX1, Sony HDR-TG1E, JVC Everio, Canon EOS 5D Mark II, Samsung NV24HD, Archos 404 Camcorder		
2010	Killers	Russell Carpenter	Arriflex D-21		
2010	Grown Ups	Theo van de Sande	Panavision Genesis		
2010	Rabbit Hole	Frank G. DeMarco	Red One M		
2010	Rubber	Quentin Dupieux	Canon EOS 5D Mark II		
2010	Twelve	Steven Fierberg	Red One M		
2010	Zebraman 2: Attack on Zebra City	Kazushige Tanaka	Sony CineAlta F23, Sony CineAlta SRW-9000	Zeiss DigiPrime, Fujinon E-Series Zoom Lenses	
2009	Avatar	Mauro Fiore	Fusion Camera System	Fujinon 6.3-101mm T2 and 7-35mm T1.8	First 100% digitally photographed film to win the Academy Award for Best Cinematography
2009	The Informant!	Steven Soderbergh	Red One M	Red Pro prime	
2009	Survival of the Dead	Adam Swica	Red One M		
2009	Youth in Revolt	Chuy Chávez	Sony CineAlta F35		
2009	The Box	Steven Poster	Panavision Genesis		
2009	Zombieland	Michael Bonvillain	Panavision Genesis		
2009	The Final Destination	Glen MacPherson	Sony CineAlta F23, Sony HDC-F950		
2009	District 9	Trent Opaloch	Red One M		
2009	The Secret in Their Eyes	Félix Monti	Red One M		
2009	Valhalla Rising	Morten Søborg	Red One M		
2009	Public Enemies	Dante Spinotti	Sony CineAlta F23		Some car interiors during chases shot on Sony XDCAM EX-1
2009	The Girlfriend Experience	Steven Soderbergh	Red One M	Panavision C-series anamorphic	
2009	Gamer	Ekkehart Pollack	Red One M		
2009	Oxhide II	Liu Jiayin	Sony Digital Betacam		
2009	Antichrist	Anthony Dod Mantle	Red One M		Phantom HD Camera used for high-speed photography
2009	S. Darko	Chris Fisher	Red One M		
2009	Surviving Evil	Mike Downie	Thomson Viper		
2009	Tetro	Mihai Mălaimare Jr.	Sony CineAlta F900		
2009	Crank: High Voltage	Brandon Trost	Canon XH-A1		Fifteen Canon HF10 were used as Crash-Cams
2009	The Book of Eli	Don Burgess	Red One M	Panavision Primo	
2009	Knowing	Simon Duggan	Red One M		
2009	Achchamundu! Achchamundu!	Arthur Wilson	Red One M		
2009	Like You Know It All	Kim Hoon-kwang	Sony PMW-EX1		
2009	My Bloody Valentine 3D	Brian Pearson	Red One M, Silicon Imaging SI-2K		
2009	Leaves of Grass	Roberto Schaefer	Red One M		
2009	Neighbor	Marc Jeff Schirmer	Red One M		
2008	The Spirit	Bill Pope	Panavision Genesis		Phantom HD Camera used for high-speed photography
2008	The Curious Case of Benjamin Button	Claudio Miranda	Thomson Viper	Zeiss DigiPrime	Among the first two predominantly digitally photographed films, along with Slumdog Millionaire, to be nominated for the Academy Award for Best Cinematography
2008	Slumdog Millionaire	Anthony Dod Mantle	Silicon Imaging SI-2K		The first predominantly digitally photographed film to win the Academy Award for Best Cinematography. Shot on multiple formats, including 35mm and digital stills.
2008	Rachel Getting Married	Declan Quinn	Sony CineAlta F23		
2008	You Don't Mess With The Zohan	Michael Barrett	Panavision Genesis		
2008	Chemical Wedding	Brian Herlihy	Thomson Viper		
2008	Che: Part Two	Steven Soderbergh	Red One M	Red Pro prime	
2008	Che: Part One	Steven Soderbergh	Red One M	Red Pro prime	The first feature-length film shot with Red One cameras
2008	Get Smart	Dean Semler	Panavision Genesis		
2008	Speed Racer	David Tattersall	Sony CineAlta F23	Zeiss DigiPrime	
2008	Three Monkeys	Gökhan Tiryaki	Sony CineAlta F900		
2008	Deception	Dante Spinotti	Panavision Genesis		
2008	21	Russell Carpenter	Panavision Genesis		
2008	Journey to the Center of the Earth	Chuck Shuman	Fusion Camera System		
2008	Cloverfield	Michael Bonvillain	Sony CineAlta F23		Segments, other shots include the Panasonic HVX-200, as well as the Thomson Viper
2008	RocknRolla	David Higgs	Arriflex D-20		
2008	The Bank Job	Michael Coulter	Arriflex D-21		
2008	Yesterday Was a Lie	Jason Cochard	Sony CineAlta F900		
2007	Before the Devil Knows You're Dead	Ron Fortunato	Panavision Genesis		
2007	A Thousand Years of Good Prayers	Patrick Lindenmaier	Sony HDW-F900R	Fujinon	
2007	Reign Over Me	Russ Alsobrook	Panavision Genesis		
2007	Youth Without Youth	Mihai Mălaimare Jr.	Sony CineAlta F900		
2007	Zodiac	Harris Savides	Thomson Viper	Zeiss DigiPrime	
2007	Balls of Fury	Thomas E. Ackerman	Panavision Genesis		
2007	Walk Hard: The Dewey Cox Story	Uta Briesewitz	Panavision Genesis		
2007	Superbad	Russ Alsobrook	Panavision Genesis		
2007	I Now Pronounce You Chuck and Larry	Dean Semler	Panavision Genesis		
2007	Next	David Tattersall	Panavision Genesis		
2007	Chronicle of Purgatory: The Waiter	Jason Konopisos	Panasonic AG-DVX100 (Andromeda Modification)		The Andromeda Modification bypasses the DV compression to get uncompressed 4:4:4 10-bit RGB data straight from the CCD block
2007	Planet Terror	Robert Rodriguez	Panavision Genesis		
2006	Apocalypto	Dean Semler	Panavision Genesis		
2006	Once	Tim Fleming	Sony HVR-Z1		
2006	Inland Empire	David Lynch	Sony DSR-PD150		
2006	Miami Vice	Dion Beebe	Thomson Viper		
2006	Superman Returns	Newton Thomas Sigel	Panavision Genesis		
2006	Borat	Anthony Hardwick; Luke Geissbühler	Panasonic AJ-HDC27 Varicam		Shot with two VariCams with occasional use of a Panasonic AG-DVX100
2006	Click	Dean Semler	Panavision Genesis		
2006	Climates	Gökhan Tiryaki	Sony CineAlta F900		
2006	Colossal Youth	Pedro Costa; Leonardo Simões	Panasonic AG-DVX100		
2006	Crank	Adam Biddle	Sony CineAlta F950		Some scenes shot with Canon XL-2
2006	Flyboys	Henry Braham	Panavision Genesis		
2006	Them (Ils)	David Moreau; Xavier Palud	Panasonic AG-DVX100		
2006	Still Life	Zhangke Jia	Sony HVR-Z1		
2005	Me and You and Everyone We Know	Chuy Chávez	Sony CineAlta F900		
2005	Il vento fa il suo giro	Roberto Cimatti	Panasonic AG-DVX100		
2005	Star Wars: Episode III – Revenge of the Sith	David Tattersall	Sony CineAlta F950		
2005	The Adventures of Sharkboy and Lavagirl in 3-D	Robert Rodriguez	Sony CineAlta F950		
2005	Bubble	Steven Soderbergh	Sony CineAlta F900/F950		
2005	Manderlay	Anthony Dod Mantle	Sony CineAlta F900		Some scenes shot with Sony DSR-PD100
2005	Sin City	Robert Rodriguez	Sony CineAlta F950		
2005	Oxhide	Liu Jiayin	Sony Digital Betacam		
2005	The Puffy Chair	Jay Duplass	Panasonic AG-DVX100		
2005	Wolf Creek	Will Gibson	Sony CineAlta F900		
2005	Caché	Christian Berger	Sony CineAlta F900		
2004	Sky Captain and the World of Tomorrow	Eric Adkins	Sony CineAlta F900		
2004	A Hole in My Heart	Malin Fornander Jesper Kurlandsky Lukas Moodysson Karl Strandlind			Shot digitally using DVCAM cameras, later transferred to 35mm for theatrical distribution
2004	Collateral	Paul Cameron; Dion Beebe	Sony CineAlta F900, Thomson Viper		35mm used for some scenes
2004	Land of Plenty	Franz Lustig	Panasonic AG-DVX100		
2004	The World	Yu Lik-wai	Sony CineAlta F900		
2004	9 Songs	Marcel Zyskind	Panasonic AG-DVX100		Other scenes shot with Sony DSR-PD150
2004	November	Nancy Schreiber	Panasonic AG-DVX100		
2004	Zebraman	Kazunari Tanaka	Sony CineAlta F900	Panavision Primo Digital Lenses	
2003	The Ghouls	Nicholas Loizides	Canon XL-1s		
2003	Dogville	Anthony Dod Mantle	Sony CineAlta F900		Some scenes shot with Sony DSR-PD100
2003	Spy Kids 3-D: Game Over	Robert Rodriguez	Sony CineAlta F900		
2003	Once Upon A Time in Mexico	Robert Rodriguez	Sony CineAlta F900		Was filmed in 2001 but released theatrically in 2003
2003	Red Cockroaches	Miguel Coyula	Canon GL1		
2003	Pieces of April	Tami Reiker	Sony DSR-PD150		Filmed in 2002 and released in 2003
2003	Virgin	Benjamin Wolf	Sony DSR-PD150		Shot in 2002 and released in 2003
2003	Burning Annie	Stephan Schultze	Sony CineAlta F900		
2002	Unknown Pleasures	Yu Lik-wai	Sony DSR-PD150		Other scenes shot in Digital Betacam
2002	Spy Kids 2: The Island of Lost Dreams	Robert Rodriguez	Sony CineAlta F900		
2002	Russian Ark	Tilman Büttner	Sony CineAlta F900	Canon ENG	
2002	Star Wars: Episode II – Attack of the Clones	David Tattersall	Sony CineAlta F900		Cited by the British Film Institute as "the first digitally shot blockbuster to hit cinemas."
2002	9 Songs	Marcel Zyskind	Panasonic AG-DVX100		Other scenes shot with Sony DSR-PD150
2002	Full Frontal	Steven Soderbergh	Canon XL-1s		
2002	Personal Velocity: Three Portraits	Ellen Kuras	Sony DSR-PD150		
2002	Tadpole	Hubert Taczanowski	Sony DSR-PD150		Shot with three digital cameras
2002	24 Hour Party People	Robby Muller	Sony DSR-PD150		
2002	28 Days Later	Anthony Dod Mantle	Canon XL-1s		Some shots in 35mm
2001	Things Behind the Sun	Terry Stacey	Sony DSR-500		
2001	Xuxa e os Duendes	Cezar Moraes	Sony CineAlta F900		
2001	All About Lily Chou-Chou	Noboru Shinoda	Sony CineAlta F900		
2001	The Anniversary Party	John Bailey	Sony DSR-500		
2001	By Hook or By Crook	Ann T. Rossetti	Sony vx2000		
2001	The King Is Alive	Jens Schlosser	Sony DSR-PD150		
2001	The Center of the World	The Chau Ngo	Sony DVW-700, Sony DSR-PD100		Used Digital Betacam for some scenes and the Sony DRV-100for others
2001	The Wager	Arnar Thor Thorisson	Sony CineAlta F900		Shot in 2001, released in 2004
2001	Vidocq	Jean-Pierre Sauvaire; Jean-Claude Thibaut	Sony HDW-F900 CineAlta		
2001	You Got Nothin'	Cliff Hsui; Jonathan Zames	Sony HDW-F900 CineAlta		Shot in 2001, released in 2002.
2001	Xtracurricular	J.P. Lipa	Sony HDW-F900 CineAlta		Some scenes shot on Panasonic AJ-HDC27 Varicam and Sony DSR-500WS. Shot in 2001, released in 2003
2001	Tortilla Soup	Xavier Pérez Grobet	Panasonic AJ-HDC27 Varicam		Home video release from 35mm Interpostive
2001	Session 9	Uta Briesewitz	Sony HDW-F900 CineAlta		
2000	Italian for Beginners	Jørgen Johansson	Sony DVW-700WS		
2000	Bamboozled	Ellen Kuras	Sony DCR-VX1000		Some scenes shot in 16mm
2000	Fuckland	José Luis Márques	Sony DCR-TRV900		
2000	Chuck & Buck	Chuy Chávez	Sony DCR-VX1000		
2000	Dancer in the Dark	Robby Müller	Sony DXC-D30WS		Musical numbers shot with 100 Sony DSR-PD100s
2000	Our Lady of the Assassins	Barbet Schroeder	Sony HDW-700		Premiered September 1, 2000 (Telluride Film Festival)
2000	Ivans Xtc	Bernard Rose	Sony HDW-700A		Premiered September 12, 2000 (Toronto International Film Festival)
2000	Everything Put Together	Roberto Schaefer	Sony DCR-VX1000		Shot entirely on HD in the summer of 1999, premiered in 2000
1999	Solid Ones	Matthew W. David	Sony HDW-700A		Shot entirely on HD in the summer of 1999, premiered in 2000
1999	God Wears My Underwear	Leslie Streit	Canon XL-1	Canon EOS zoom	Shot in 1999, released in 2005
1999	The New Women	Larra Anderson	Canon XL-1	Canon EOS zoom	Shot in 1999, released in 2001
1999	Julien Donkey-Boy	Anthony Dod Mantle	Sony DCR-TRV900		Shot with a Sony DCR-TRV900 on MiniDV tape, then transferred to 16mm film and blown up to 35mm film for master print
1998	Love & Pop	Takahide Shibanushi	Sony DCR-VX1000		The film was shot almost entirely on handheld digital cameras. Specified as a Sony DCR-VX1000 camera.
1998	The Last Broadcast	Lance Weiler	Sony DCR-VX1000		For some sequences a toy video camera from Tyco was used
1998	The Book of Life	Jim Denault	Sony DCR-VX1000		
1998	The Celebration	Anthony Dod Mantle	Sony DCR-PC3		
1997	The Idiots	Lars von Trier	Sony DCR-VX1000		
1997	Hope	Pete Anderson	Canon GL1		
1996	Windhorse	Steve Schecter	Sony DVW-700WS Sony DCR-VX1000		Premiered 1998 at the Santa Barbara Film Festival
1996	The Demons in My Head	Grant Hoy	Sony DVW-700WS		Premiered 15 June 1997 at the Sanctuary Cove Village Theater, Queensland, Australia. Also first feature film to be online edited in a computer and projected digitally

== See also ==
- List of large sensor interchangeable-lens video cameras
- List of motion picture topics
- Filmizing
- Russian Ark - The first feature film shot completely in uncompressed high-definition
