= Log profile =

Color and dynamic range on video cameras

A log profile, or logarithmic profile, is a shooting profile, or gamma curve, found on some digital video cameras that gives a wide dynamic and tonal range, allowing more latitude to apply colour and style choices. The resulting image appears washed out, requiring color grading in post-production, but retains shadow and highlight detail that would otherwise be lost if a regular linear profile had been used that clipped shadow and highlight detail. The feature is mostly used in filmmaking and videography.

== History ==
Log profile initially derived from the Cineon film scanner, developed by Kodak in early 1990s, which uses logarithmic gamma encoding to utilize higher color bit depth (i.e. 16-bit) linear image sensor, to reproduce characteristics of negative film image. In early times of digital cinematography, professional video cameras were only capable to capture linear sensor image up to 10-bit color depth even in HDCAM-SR format, but resulted in "video-look" compared with film stock cinematography even in the same 24 frames per second and shutter speeds.

The log gamma profile began gaining industrial popularity since 2005, when Arri released Arriflex D-20 which provided original Log-C gamma through HD-SDI video output, and further in 2008, when Sony released CineAlta F35 camera (and its 2005 Panavision Genesis sibling) with S-Log video recording on HDCAM-SR tape. Those camera releases boosted digital cinematography deployment.

For consumer and prosumer cameras, Canon released Cinema EOS C300, which provided Canon Log video recording function, while Sony released S-Log2 profile on its Alpha 7II digital still camera, allowing low budget filmmakers to produce film-like motion pictures.

== Proprietary log profiles on various cameras ==
- Log-C on Arri digital cameras, based on Kodak's Cineon log gamma (including Log-C3 and Log-C4, not to be confused with Canon Log)
- C-Log or Canon Log on Canon cameras (including C-Log2 and C-Log3)
- D-Log on DJI UAV cameras
- F-Log on Fujifilm cameras
- N-Log on Nikon cameras
- REDlogFilm on RED cameras (including Log3G10.)
- S-Log on Sony cameras (including S-Log2 and S-Log3)
- V-Log on Panasonic cameras (including Lumix and Varicam models).

== See also ==
- Digital intermediate
- Hybrid log–gamma
- Raw image format
- Rec. 709
