= DVX =

DVX may refer to:

== Brands ==
- Santana DVX, a sparkling wine endorsed by Carlos Santana
- DVX, a sunglass brand that is sold at the Walmart Vision Center
- The Panasonic AG-DVX100, an early consumer-affordable camcorder

== Other uses ==
- Dux, Latin for leader
- DESQview/X, a text-mode multitasking program
- "Santana DVX", a song about the wine from The Lonely Island's album Incredibad
- Former IATA code for Denver International Airport
