= Arri Alexa =

Digital motion picture camera system by Arri

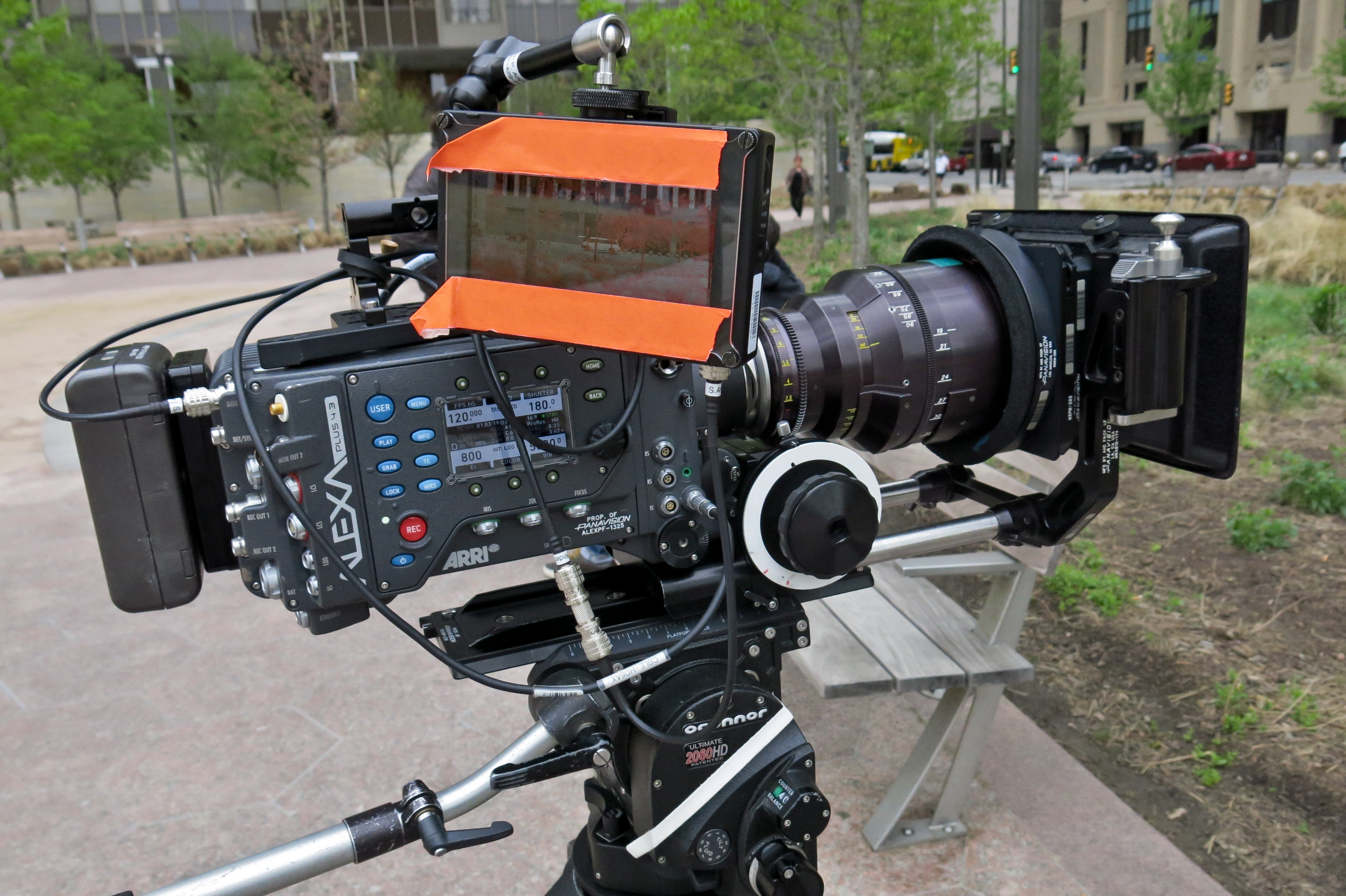
Arri Alexa camera

The Arri Alexa is a digital motion picture camera system developed by Arri. The Arri Alexa was introduced in April 2010 and was Arri's first major transition into digital cinematography, after previous efforts including the Arriflex D-20 and D-21.

Alexa cameras are designed to be used in feature films, television shows and commercials. Alexa uses the ALEV series of image sensors manufactured by ON Semiconductor.

== Overview ==
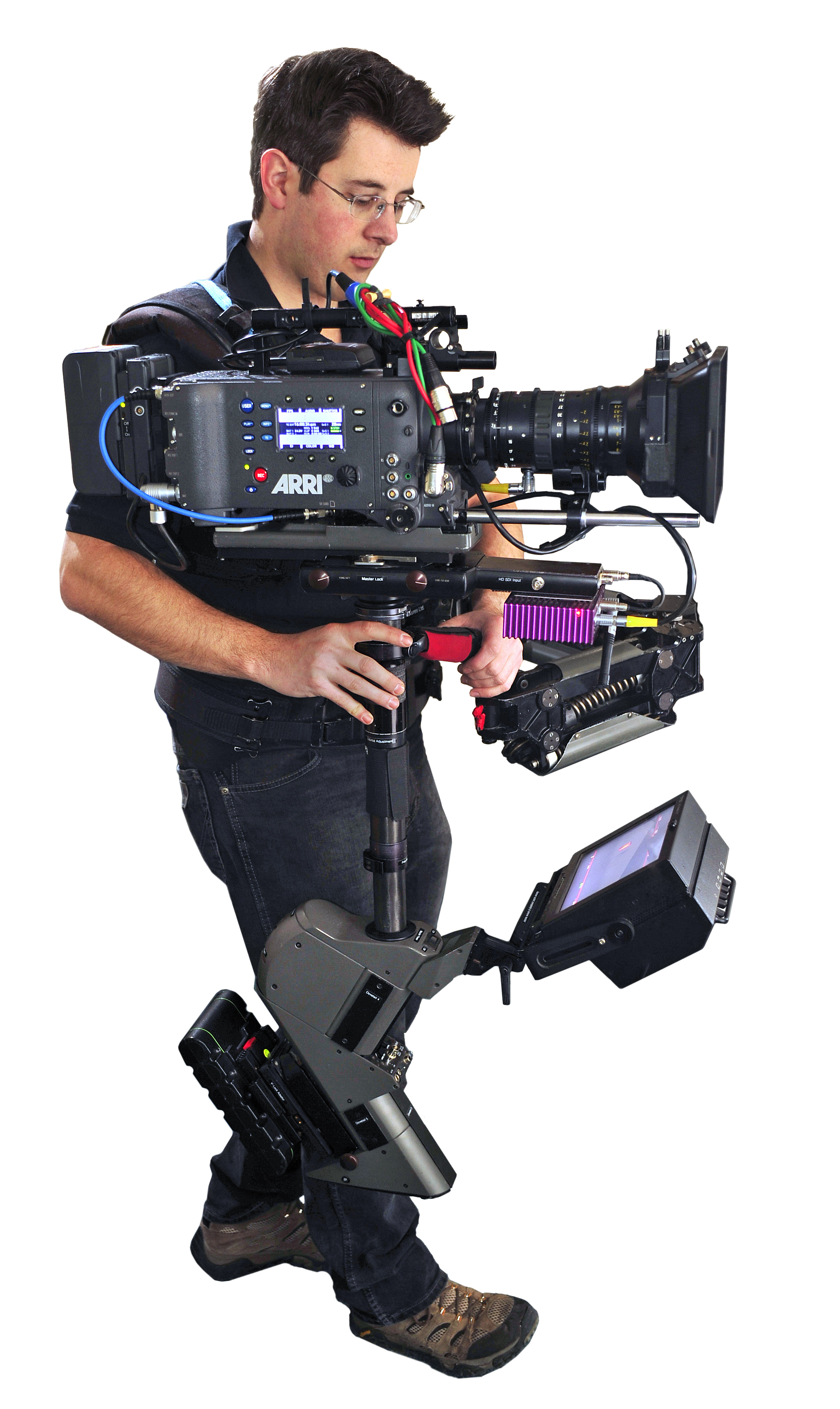
Arri Alexa camera being used with Master Steadicam

The Alexa camera system introduced their Log-C imaging science as a digital negative, which allows digital cinema images to be processed like scanned film images.

The camera has several methods of recording, including SxS cards, CFast 2.0 cards and SXR Capture Drives at resolutions up to 3424 × 2202 pixels in either Rec. 709 HD video color space or Log-C to ProRes or ArriRaw codecs. The Alexa camera offers additional and optional software licenses that unlock different capabilities of the Alexa Camera. This includes; high speed 120fps recording, the DNxHD codec and 4:3 "open gate" mode for anamorphic lenses.

The Alexa camera system includes; modularity, PL mount lenses, a Super 35-sized CMOS sensor shooting up to 3424×2202 resolution and supports uncompressed video or proprietary raw (ArriRaw) codec.

The price of the camera depends on the model and accessories. For example, in 2015, an Arri Alexa XT cost approximately $66,000 to $100,000, depending on accessories included.

== Models ==
=== Alexa ===
The Alexa (also known as the Alexa Classic) was announced in April 2010 and was the first camera released of the product family. The Alexa's CMOS Super-35mm sensor is rated at 2.8K and ISO 800. That sensitivity allows the camera to see a full seven stops of overexposure and another seven stops of underexposure. To take advantage of this, Arri offers both industry-standard Rec.709 HD video output as well as the Log-C mode that shows the entire range of the chip's sensitivity, allowing for an extreme range of color correction options in post production. In June 2010 it got updated with an electronic viewfinder.

=== Alexa Plus (4:3) ===
The Alexa Plus, introduced in April 2011 added integrated wireless remote control, the Arri Lens Data System (LDS), additional outputs, lens synchronization for 3-D, and built-in position and motion sensors. In May 2012 it was upgraded with a 4:3 sensor making it ideal for anamorphic cinematography.

=== Alexa Studio ===
The Alexa Studio, introduced in February 2012 features an optical viewfinder, mechanical shutter, and was the first Alexa camera to use a 4:3 sensor for anamorphic cinematography.

=== Alexa M ===
The Alexa M, introduced in April 2012 had its imaging and processing unit broken down in two parts to be small, compact and lightweight for 3-D rigs and other uses where size is a concern. A special version of the Alexa M, called the Alexa SXT-M, was created for Gemini Man.

=== Alexa XT ===
In February 2013, the range was renewed as the Alexa XT (XT standing for extended technology) series. Alexa XT cameras are equipped with the XR module, which replaces the SxS module and allows direct ArriRaw recording without the need for an external recorder. Further improvements is an internal tray for ND filters, a 4:3 sensor, open gate sensor mode at 3.4K with ArriRaw, and a quieter cooling fan. The range accordingly comprises the Alexa, the Alexa XT, the Alexa XT M, the Alexa XT Plus, the Alexa XT Studio and the Alexa Fiber Remote. The Alexa Classic cameras can be upgraded with the XR module for internal raw recording from May 2013; it provides most XT features, though the existing sensor aspect ratio of the Classic cameras stay the same. The Alexa XT and XT Plus arrived in May 2013, while the Alexa XT M in June and the Alexa XT Studio in July of the same year. The Alexa XT Plus B/W released in January 2014, for rental only.

=== Alexa 65 ===
On 21 September 2014 at the Cinec convention in Munich, Arri announced the Alexa 65, a 6.5K 65mm digital cinema camera. As with cameras from competitor Panavision, the Alexa 65 camera was available by rental only, provided through the Arri Rental Group. The Alexa 65 uses the A3X sensor, composed of three vertical ALEV III sensors, which has a maximum recordable resolution of 6560x3100 and records ArriRaw only. It was released in January 2015.

The first production to use the camera was Mission: Impossible – Rogue Nation (2015), which was used to shoot the underwater sequence, and around 40% of The Revenant (2015).

A 3-D custom variant was used to film specific scenes in Captain America: Civil War (2016). Avengers: Infinity War (2018) and Avengers: Endgame (2019) were the first narrative feature films shot entirely with the camera.

=== Alexa Mini ===
On 24 February 2015, Arri announced the Alexa Mini and released it in May of the same year. It has the same sensor as the other Alexa cameras housed in a smaller body. It records to CFast 2.0 cards, 200 FPS, 4K UHD in-camera upscaling, and built-in motorized ND filters.

=== Alexa SXT ===
On 18 March 2015, Arri announced the SXT line of Alexa cameras which replaced the XR module with the SXR module and support in-camera upscaling of Apple ProRes to 4K resolution and Rec. 2020 color space. XT, XT Plus and XT Studio cameras can be upgraded with the SXR module, which released later in the same year, while a wireless version, called Alexa SXT W was released in 2017.

=== Alexa LF ===
On 2 February 2018, Arri announced the Alexa LF at the BSC Expo. It is a 4K large-format camera. The Alexa LF's A2X sensor is based on two vertical ALEV III sensors, which are stitched together to create a seamless large format image. This is the same principle that was used to create the Alexa 65, which uses three Alexa sensors that are arranged vertically. The Alexa LF can record in open gate in a resolution of 4448 × 3096.

=== Alexa Mini LF ===
On 28 March 2019, Arri announced the Alexa Mini LF, which houses the same sensor as the Alexa LF inside a camera body similar to the Alexa Mini. Additional improvements over the Alexa Mini include an improved EVF (MVF-2) with a larger flip-out monitor and power outputs for camera accessories. The camera also features a new Codex recording module, which accepts 1TB Codex Compact Drives.

=== Alexa 35 ===
On 31 May 2022, Arri announced the Alexa 35. It uses Super 35 ALEV 4 sensor, Arri's first new sensor for the Alexa family since the release of the first model in 2010. The sensor is sized 27.99 x 19.22 mm and records at a resolution of 4608 × 3164 with 17 stops of dynamic range. It is the first camera in the Alexa line to allow for full-height, natively 4K anamorphic shooting.

=== Alexa 265 ===
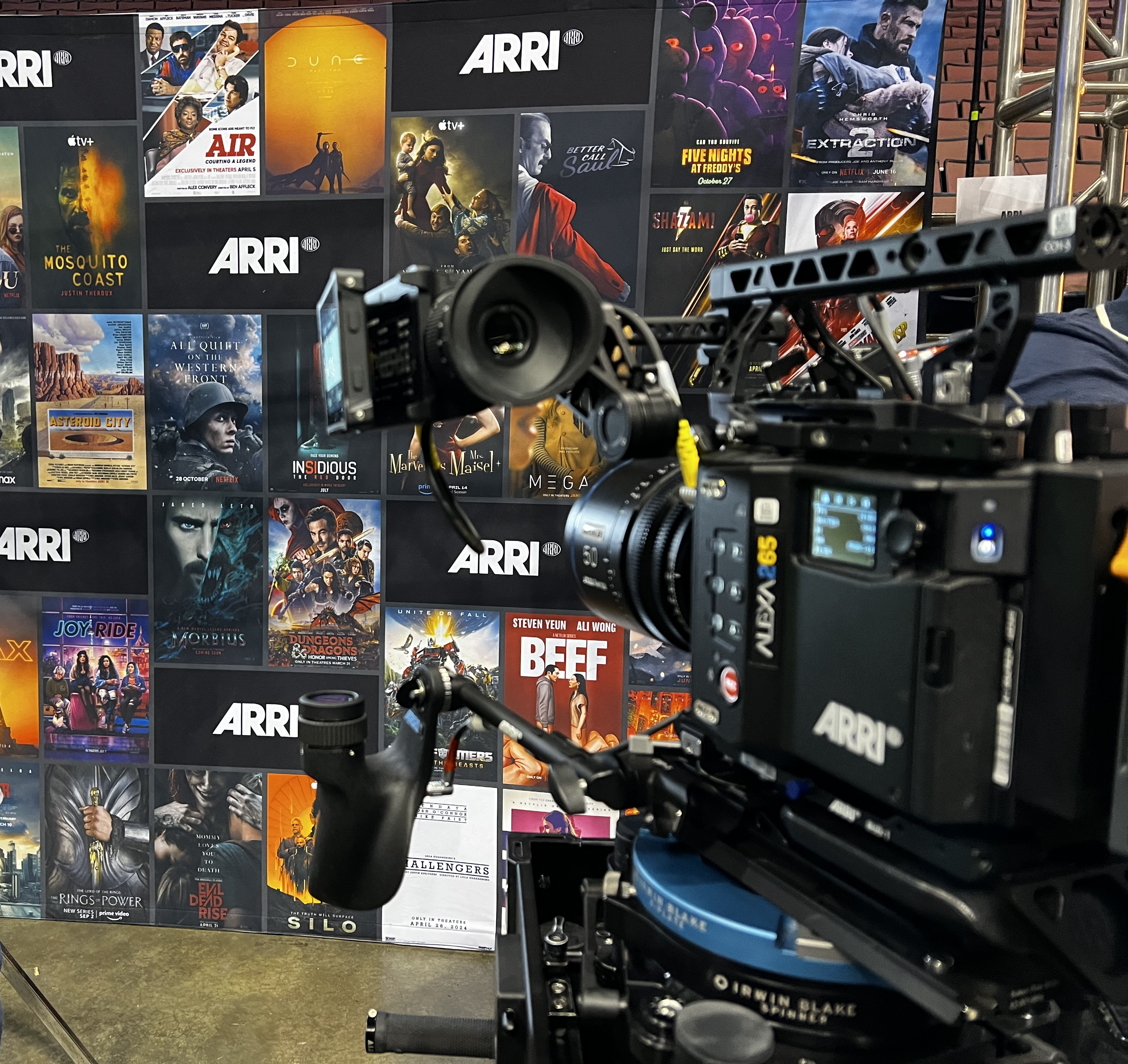
An Alexa 265 at the 2025 New Jersey Film Expo

On 5 December 2024, Arri announced the Alexa 265. The Alexa 265 body is based on the Alexa 35, making it lighter than the Alexa 65. The Alexa 265 weighs 3.3 kilograms (7.3 pounds), while the Alexa 65 weighs 10.5 kilograms (23 pounds). The Alexa 265 uses a revised version of the A3X 65mm sensor that increases dynamic range from 14 to 15 stops and the native ISO range from 3200 to 6400.

=== Alexa 35 Xtreme ===
On 31 July 2025, Arri announced the Alexa 35 Xtreme. It is available both as a new camera and a hardware upgrade to the original Alexa 35. It has higher frame rates in all modes and it also introduces the Sensor Overdrive mode, which unlocks even higher maximum frame rates for extreme slow motion (up to 660 fps), although this mode has fewer stops of dynamic range. In addition to the ArriRaw codec, the camera can also record in the compressed ArriCore codec which produces smaller files while capturing quality comparable to ArriRaw.

== Sensors ==
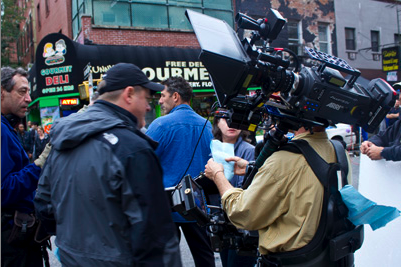
Arri Alexa being used on the set of Law & Order: SVU

The ALEV III sensor debuted in the first Alexa model in 2010. It has 3424×2202 effective pixels used for generating images. 2880×2160 pixels are generally used for recording on the Alexa Studio and M in 4:3 mode, and 2880×1620 pixels are used for recording on the regular Alexa and other models in 16:9 mode. The rest of the sensor is used for viewing the scene in the viewfinder. Alternatively, the full sensor resolution may be employed in "open gate" mode for resolution-demanding situations. It has a native ISO of 800 and records 14.5 stops of dynamic range.

The Alexa LF and Alexa Mini LF use the A2X sensor, composed of two vertical ALEV III sensors, which has a 36.70mm × 25.54mm active imaging area. It provides up to 4448×3096 maximum recordable resolution.

The Alexa 65 uses the A3X sensor, composed of three vertical ALEV III sensors, which has a 54.12 mm × 25.59 mm active imaging area. It provides up to 6560×3102 open gate maximum recordable resolution.

The ALEV 4 sensor debuted in 2022 with the release of the Alexa 35. It is sized at 27.99 x 19.22 mm and records at a resolution of 4608 × 3164 with 17 stops of dynamic range.

== Recording media ==
The Arri Alexa can record to 1920×1080 ProRes 422 or ProRes 4444 on SxS Cards or 2880×1620 ArriRaw to external recording devices. The Arri Alexa Firmware 7 increases the resolution on the SxS cards to 2K ProRes 4444 (formerly 1080p).

== ARRIRAW ==
ARRIRAW is an uncompressed format that contains unaltered Bayer sensor information. The camera's data stream was initially recorded via T-link with certified recorders like the CODEX Onboard from Codex Digital. When the Alexa XT was introduced, an internal CODEX recording solution was used, using CODEX Capture Drives. The CODEX Compact Drive replaced these following the introduction of the Alexa Mini LF and Alexa 35.

ARRIRAW files can be reduced in size by up to 50% using CODEX High-density Encoding (HDE). This lossless compression format provides workflow improvements that match those of lossy compressed formats.

== Reception ==
According to cinematographer Roger Deakins, the Alexa's tonal range, color space, and latitude exceed the capabilities of shooting in film. "This camera has brought us to a point where digital is simply better", said Deakins. Deakins used the camera to shoot In Time, the James Bond film Skyfall, Prisoners, Unbroken, Sicario, The Goldfinch, Empire of Light, and the Academy Award for Best Cinematography winners Blade Runner 2049 and 1917. Cinematographers Florian Ballhaus and Robert Elswit have also praised the Alexa, particularly the Alexa 65.

The Alexa is the dominant camera in the professional film industry, and was used as the primary system on over 70% of the top 100 grossing films since 2016. Since its introduction, eight movies shot on Alexa (Argo, Birdman, Spotlight, Moonlight, The Shape of Water, Green Book, Parasite, Nomadland, and Everything Everywhere All at Once) won an Academy Award for Best Picture. Also, movies shot on Alexa won Academy Award for Best Cinematography ten times, including five in a row between 2011 and 2015, for Hugo, Life of Pi, Gravity, Birdman, The Revenant, Blade Runner 2049, Roma, 1917, Dune, and All Quiet on the Western Front.

== Similar cameras ==
- Arriflex D-20 and D-21
- Panavision Genesis, released in 2005
- RED Digital
- Sony CineAlta
- Panasonic VariCam
- Blackmagic URSA
