= HS2 (disambiguation) =

HS2, or High Speed 2, is a planned high-speed railway, partly under construction in the United Kingdom.

HS2 or HS-2 may also refer to:

== Military ==
- HS-2, a US Navy helicopter squadron known as the Golden Falcons, re-designated in 2009 as HSC-12
- HS-2, a variant of the Curtiss HS US Navy flying boat of World War I

== Science and technology ==
- HS2, a Hypersonic Gun tunnel in Oxford University, part of the UK's National Wind Tunnel Facility
- HS2, also known as Hotspot 2.0 and Wi-Fi Certified Passpoint, a service for public access Wi-Fi
- HS2, a designation for a type of automotive light bulb for motorcycles
- HS-2, serial number of one of the plutonium-gallium hemispheres used for the core in the first nuclear test detonation, codenamed Trinity
- HS-2, a model of the Weisscam digital high-speed camera, manufactured by German company P+S Technik
- HS-2, a guitar pickup manufactured by US company DiMarzio

== Other ==
- HS-2, a variant of the Mrigasheer, a glider built by the Indian Civil Aviation Department
- HS2, a part of the British HS postcode area

== See also ==
- High Speed 2 (disambiguation)
