= Arriflex D-21 =

American digital motion picture camera

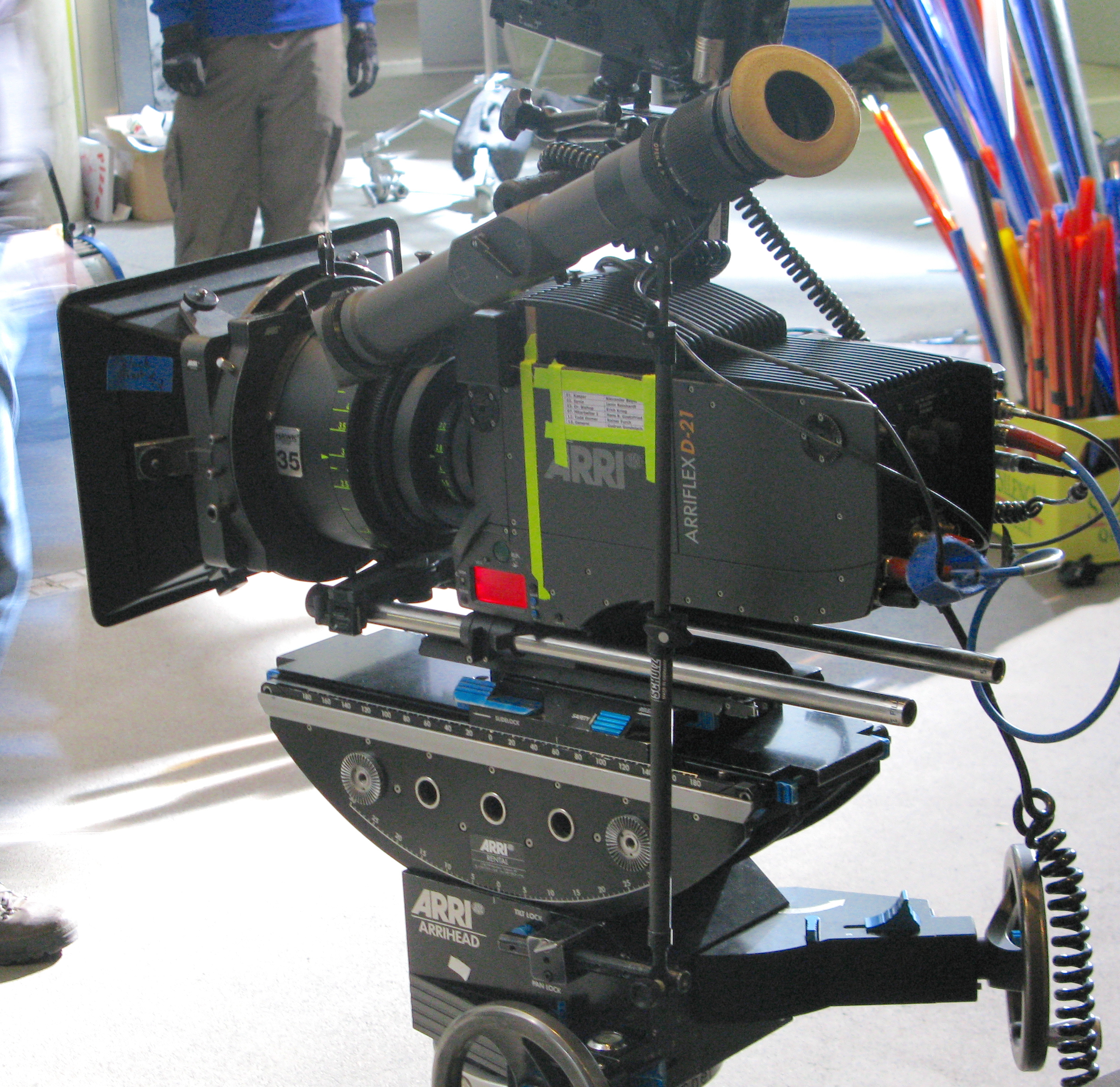
Arriflex D 21 on a dolly

The Arriflex D-21 is a film-style digital motion picture camera introduced by Arri in 2008 to replace their earlier generation Arriflex D-20.

== Overview ==
The D-21 uses a Super 35 (4:3 aspect ratio) sized single CMOS sensor and accepts 35 mm film camera lenses (54mm PL mount). It features an optical viewfinder and modular construction.

The D-21 captures images in three general modes: HD ('HD422 (16:9)' or 'HD444 (16:9)'), Mscope, and Data ('ARRIRAW (16:9)' or 'ARRIRAW (4:3)'). Its sensor is a CMOS chip with a Bayer mask, with dimensions of 2880x2160 pixels.

== Similar cameras ==
- Arri Alexa
- Panavision Genesis camera
- Red One
