= Thomson Viper FilmStream Camera =

Digital movie camera

The Thomson Viper FilmStream camera is a digital movie camera produced by Thomson Multimedia (now Vantiva). Introduced in the early 2000s as makers of feature films were turning to digital cinematography, the Viper influenced subsequent HD, UHD, and HDR cameras.

== History ==
The Viper FilmStream was announced in 2002 by Thomson after being developed by its Grass Valley subsidiary which it had purchased earlier that year. It followed early Sony CineAlta cameras and preceded the Panavision Genesis by less than a year. The Viper could replay takes immediately after they were shot, something early Genesis versions and other cameras of the era could not.

Films shot on the Viper include Michael Mann's Collateral, Miami Vice, and Public Enemies and David Fincher's Zodiac and The Curious Case of Benjamin Button. Cinematographer Dion Beebe described the Viper as the "primary camera" on Collateral; on both Zodiac and Collateral 35mm film was used only for overcranking. Zodiac was the first digital feature film made by a major studio without using videotape or compression in its capture or editing. Fincher became interested in using the camera on a feature film after shooting commercials for Nike and Xelibri with it.

In 2017, Grass Valley received a Scientific and Technical Award from the Academy of Motion Picture Arts and Sciences for its Viper.

== Specifications ==
- Sensors: : 3 x 2/3" HD-DPM 9.2 million pixel CCDs
- Effective pixels: 1920 (vertical) x 4320 (horizontal sub-pixels); aspect ratio 16:9 (1.77:1) in 1080 and 720 line modes, or 2.37:1 in 1080p mode
- Bit depth: 12-bit linear A-D conversion, mapped to 10-bit logarithmic signals for downstream processing
- Power: 12V DC nominal (11.5 – 17V); ~44W (including 2" viewfinder and FilmStream adapter)
- Mount: Standard B4 lens mount for popular digital cinematography prime and zoom lenses
- Weight: 4.3 kg including 2" viewfinder and FilmStream adapter
- Overall dimensions: 197mm x 117mm x 349mm
- Optical filters: f1.4 prism system; first filter wheel clear, 2-stop, 4-stop, 6-stop ND; second filter wheel clear, 4-point star, 6-point star, soft focus
- Formats and Frames per second:
  - 1080p at 23.98, 24, 25, and 29.97 fps
  - 1080i at 50 and 59.94 Hz
  - 720p at 23.98, 24, 25, 29.97, 50, and 59.94 fps.
- Multiple field recording options:
  - Solid-state, on-camera RAM recorder for cable-free operation
  - High-capacity field recorder with exchangeable disk packs
  - Third-party field recording support
