= High Speed 2 (disambiguation) =

High Speed 2 is a planned, partly under construction, high-speed railway line in the United Kingdom.

High Speed 2 may also refer to:

- The Getaway: High Speed II, a 1992 pinball game

== See also ==
- HSL 2, High Speed Line 2, a railway in Belgium
- HS2 (disambiguation)
