= Blackmagic URSA =

Overview
- Maker: Blackmagic Design
- Type: Digital movie camera
- Released: August 4, 2014; 12 years ago

Lens
- Lens mount: Canon EF *Arri PL *B4 bl
- Lens: Interchangeable

Sensor/medium
- Sensor type: CMOS
- Recording medium: Lossless CinemaDNG RAW *RAW 3:1 and 4:1 *Apple ProRes

Shutter
- Shutter: Global shutter

General
- AV ports: 12G-SDI; 3G-SDI; XLR; 1/4" jack
- Data ports: BNC Timecode input/output; BNC reference input; LANC; USB 2.0 Mini-B
- Dimensions: 8.8 in × 12.6 in × 6 in (22 cm × 32 cm × 15 cm)
- Weight: 16.32 lb (7.40 kg)
- Made in: Australia

The Blackmagic URSA is a digital movie camera developed and manufactured by Blackmagic Design, released on August 8, 2014. It is the first camera to be user-upgradeable for additional equipment manufactured by Blackmagic and other third-party makers.

== History ==
At the NAB Show in April 2014, Blackmagic Design announced the URSA digital movie camera, which was the first movie camera to be user-upgradeable for additional equipment, alongside the Studio Camera, the television-oriented version of the Cinema Camera. In November, a firmware update maxed the frame rate to 80p and added a new 3:1 compression ratio for RAW files.

In April 2015, the URSA Mini was announced and all URSA models and variants received another update that upgraded the maximum frame rate for the windowed 1080p resolution to 150 fps and added support for Apple ProRes 4444 XQ and updated the models with a second-generation sensor. A B4 lens mount was added to the Mini in September. The 4.6K version of the Mini was then released in March 2016, controversially without global shutter. In August, a public beta of the redesigned Camera Utility 4.0 for URSA Mini was released.

== Design ==
=== Specifications and hardware ===
The camera can come in both 4K and 4.6K specifications, with max resolutions being 4608 x 2592 for the 4.6K spec and 4000 x 2160 for the 4K. All models and variants include a license key for DaVinci Resolve. The camera comprises two displays; the main 10.1" flip-out TFT-LCD that is controlled using physical buttons and a 5" LCD capacitive touchscreen that can show recording status and can be used to access features by another operator. The camera records lossless CinemaDNG RAW, RAW 3:1 and 4:1 and Apple ProRes.

Model	Formats	FPS	Max Resolution	Max Write Speed for RAW @ 80FPS (Average)
EF	RAW, ProRes 4444 and 422	23.98, 24, 25, 29.97, 30, 50, 59.94, 60, 80, 90, 120, 240	4000 x 2160	8MB/Frame (640 MB/s - 1m 40s on 64 GB / 3m 20s on 128 GB)
PL	RAW, ProRes 4444 and 422	23.98, 24, 25, 29.97, 30, 50, 59.94, 60, 80, 90, 120, 240	4000 x 2160	8MB/Frame (640 MB/s - 1m 40s on 64 GB / 3m 20s on 128 GB)
Broadcast	ProRes 4444 and 422	23.98, 24, 25, 29.97, 30, 50, 59.94, 60	3840 x 2160	6MB/Frame (360 MB/s - 2m 58s on 64 GB / 5m 54s on 128 GB)
HDMI	RAW, ProRes 4444 and 422	—N/a	3840 x 2160	6MB/Frame (360 MB/s - 2m 58s on 64 GB / 5m 54s on 128 GB)

=== Software ===
The URSA uses Camera Utility, the proprietary software developed by Blackmagic also in use for the Cinema Cameras. The software allows the user to add metadata about a single file, including - but not limited to: shot, take and scene numbers, as well as filenames. However, the system must be updated through a computer using USB instead of other technologies like firmware over the air.

== Models and variants ==
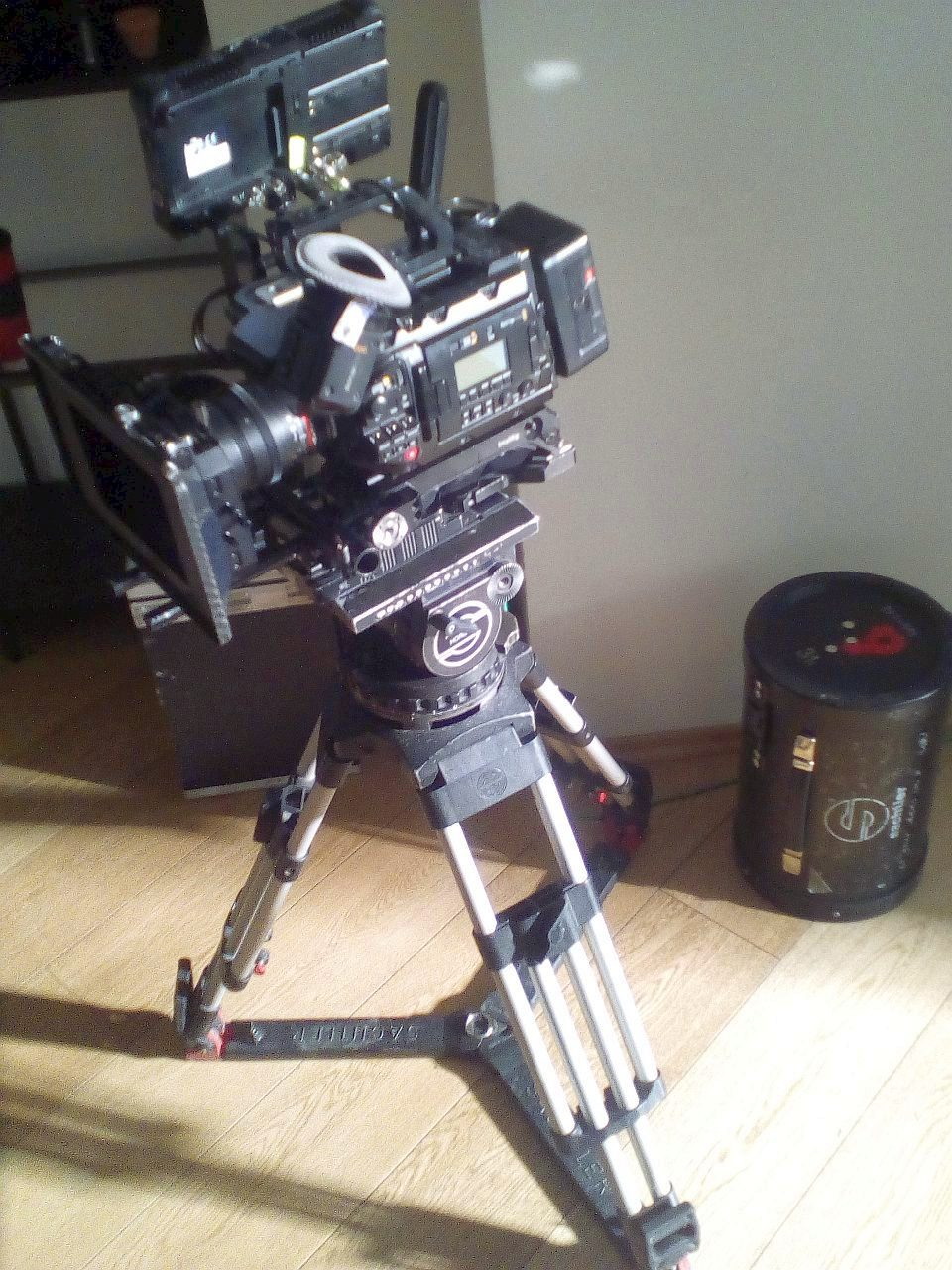
Blackmagic URSA mini videocamera with a Canon EF mount and lens

The URSA is available in four different models: EF, PL, HDMI and Broadcast. The EF and PL mounts are interchangeable and can work with any compatible lenses. However, the HDMI model doesn't have a lens system at all and a separate camera must be connected to the camera via HDMI to record. It has a threaded camera mount to mount a camera onto the URSA. The Broadcast model uses an optimized sensor for broadcasting in Ultra HD, as well as a specialized B4 lens mount and a neutral-density filter wheel on the body.

=== URSA Mini ===
The Blackmagic URSA Mini is a variant of the URSA camera. The 4.6k variant was released on March 17, 2016. It has a smaller form factor and loses some functionality and features over the URSA, losing the secondary 5" touchscreen, global shutter on the 4.6k variant and other features. However, it does ship in 4K and 4.6K specifications, and ships in EF and PL mounts.

=== URSA Mini Pro ===
The Blackmagic URSA Mini Pro was released on March 2, 2017. Compared to the URSA Mini, it adds an internal neutral density wheel, shoulder-accessible controls, and a secondary 4" touchscreen, 2 SD and 2 C.Fast slots, auto handy focus with autofocus lenses, High Frame Rate record, HFR Mode, Timelapse recording, Video Broadcast record and ships only in a 4.6K specification. Its most unique feature is a user-interchangeable lens mount. The camera ships with an EF mount, and at release time, PL and B4 mount modules were available for purchase.

=== URSA Broadcast ===
The Blackmagic URSA Broadcast was released on February 1, 2018. While not an URSA "Mini", the Broadcast uses the same platform as the URSA Mini Pro. The camera features a 4K sensor, 2/3" style B4 lens mount, traditional external controls (like on the Mini Pro), built in optical ND filters, and dual CFast and dual SD card recorders. While the Broadcast ships with a B4 mount, the camera is compatible with EF, PL and F mounts, sold separately by Blackmagic. The actual sensor size is about 13.056mm x 7.344mm, so closer to a 1" sensor, than a 2/3" sensor.

=== URSA Broadcast G2 ===
The Blackmagic URSA Broadcast G2 was released on November 12, 2021. It is the second generation of the URSA Broadcast line of cameras, and features a 6K Super 35 sensor. The camera had been in development for some time, but was prioritized due to difficulty sourcing the sensors used in the previous generation. Though equipped with a 6K sensor, the camera can only shoot 4K when used with the B4 mount and B4 broadcast lenses, though it can film in 6K when using other lens mounts such as PL, EF or F. An EF mount is provided with the camera.

=== URSA Mini Pro 4.6K G2 ===
The Blackmagic URSA Mini Pro 4.6K G2, the second generation of the URSA camera, was announced in March 2019. URSA Mini Pro 4.6K G2, is a professional digital film camera that combines 4.6K resolution with the traditional features and controls broadcast camera. The second generation URSA Mini Pro features fully redesigned internal electronics and a Super 35mm 4.6K HDR image sensor for much higher frame rate shooting. The camera also features built-in neutral density filters, an interchangeable lens mount, Blackmagic RAW support, and both dual CFast and SD UHS‑II card recorders. It can record video up to 300 frames per second. The Pro version also has a USB‑C expansion port that allows users to record directly to flash drives or SSD disks.

=== URSA Mini Pro 12K ===
The Blackmagic URSA Mini Pro 12K was released on July 16, 2020. The URSA Mini Pro 12K is the most recent addition to their URSA Mini line of cameras and boasts the highest resolution sensor of any digital film camera to date. The camera features a custom sensor, and does not use a Bayer pattern, opting instead for a sensor that includes white filters as well as the standard red, green, and blue. The camera only records in Blackmagic Raw. The camera is capable of recording 12K at 60 fps in 17:9, 4K, 6K and 8K at 120 fps, and at 4K at 240 fps, though high frame rate 4K and 6K are recorded in cropped Super 16. The camera ships with a PL mount, though others are available for purchase. The camera also has an inbuilt ND filters, and has a claimed dynamic range of 14 stops.

=== URSA Mini Pro 12K OLPF ===
The Blackmagic URSA Mini Pro 12K OLPF was released on April 16, 2023. This model is identical to the original 12K model with the addition of an Optical Low Pass Filter in front of the sensor. Unlike the older model, the OLPF version was added to the list of Netflix Approved cameras.

=== URSA CINE 12K ===
The Blackmagic URSA Cine 12K was announced on April 12, 2024, and is the first URSA camera to have a full frame large format sensor. The camera has a sensor claimed to be capable of 16 stops of dynamic range, and like the previous URSA Mini Pro 12k models, has a custom RGBW sensor layout, as opposed to the more standard Bayer pattern. The camera has interchangeable PL, EF and LPL lens mount, multiple built in monitors, and built in ND filters. It is capable of recording up to 80 fps in 12K, 144 fps at 8K and 240 fps at 4K. It is Blackmagic's first camera to come with the new B-Mount battery plate as standard, though V-mount and Gold mount are available. The camera uses a new 8 TB Media Module as its default storage media, though a CFexpress adapter will become available.

=== URSA CINE 17K ===
The Blackmagic URSA Cine 17K was also announced on April 12, 2024. It shares the same body as the URSA CINE 12K, with the major difference being its 17K 65mm digital sensor, and has interchangeable LPL and Hasselblad lens mounts.

== Accessories ==
=== Viewfinder ===
The Blackmagic URSA Viewfinder is a viewfinder made by Blackmagic Design. It comprises a 1080p OLED screen and can be focused and adjusted to both the left and right eye and only turns on by a proximity sensor dubbed the "Eye-sensor". The diopter is also user-adjustable. It screws onto the top of the URSA and URSA Mini or onto any mount compatible and connects via BNC-SDI connection and XLR, making it compatible with cameras that have these ports.

=== Studio Viewfinder ===
The Blackmagic URSA Studio Viewfinder is a viewfinder display made by Blackmagic that is exclusively for the URSA Mini. It comprises a 7" 1080p LCD screen, a menu button and three function buttons that can display various exposure, focus and framing guides and four knobs that bring up the menu and control the brightness, contrast and peaking sensitivity. It mounts on top of the Mini camera and is adjustable, has a removable sun hood and metal handles on the side.
