= Arriflex D-20 =

American digital motion picture camera

The Arriflex D-20 is a film-style digital motion picture camera made by Arri first introduced in November 2005. The camera's attributes are its optical viewfinder, modularity, and 35mm-width CMOS sensor. The camera was discontinued in 2008 when its successor, the Arriflex D-21, was introduced.

== Overview ==
The D-20 uses a single CMOS sensor the width of a Super 35 film gate aperture. Effectively the D-20, when used with current 35 mm PL mount motion picture lenses, yields the same field of view and depth of field as Super 35 mm film motion picture cameras.

The D-20 captures images in two main modes:

- In Data mode the sensor uses 2880x2160 active pixels generating RAW Bayer-data at 12 bit in a 4:3 aspect ratio. The RAW data then needs to be processed outboard to generate a full color image. A delivery aspect ratio for theatrical release, commonly 1.85:1, is achieved by cropping from the original image, similar to the cropping necessary when shooting 35 mm film. In Data mode the sensor size also allows for the use of anamorphic lenses, producing the 2.39:1 widescreen aspect ratio from the full sensor height. Captured data is recorded to either flash or hard drives, notably the sTwo data recorder.
- In HD mode the sensor uses 2880x1620 active pixels to generate an image with a 16:9 aspect ratio downsampled to 1920x1080 pixels in either YUV 4:2:2 10 bit (via single link HD-SDI) or RGB 4:4:4 10 bit (via dual link HD-SDI). Typically, the D-20 is tethered to a Sony HDCamSR recorder. Other recording options exist, including the Grass Valley flash mag which provides untethered recording of up to 15 minutes per "mag" in RGB 4:4:4.

Following recording formats are possible:

Data Mode:

- 2880 x 2160 RAW 12 bit Bayer data @ 23.976p, 24p, 25p
- 2880 x 1620 RAW 12 bit Bayer data @ 29.97p, 30p

HD Mode – HD-SDI (SMPTE 292M):

- 1920 x 1080 4:2:2 YCbCr 10 bit @ 23.976, 24, 25, 29.97, 30 PsF

HD Mode – dual link HD-SDI (SMPTE 372M):

- 1920 x 1080 4:4:4 RGB 10 bit @ 23.976, 24, 25, 29.97, 30 PsF
- 1920 x 1080 4:2:2 YCbCr 10 bit @ 48, 50, 59.94, 60PsF*

The D-20 has a mechanical shutter, variable from 11.2° to 180° or an electronic shutter that simulates a 270° mechanical shutter at 24frame/s. The camera is capable of running at speeds from 1 to 60frame/s. Numerous components of the camera were borrowed from Arri film camera models (most notably the 435ES), assuring compatibility with Arri film camera accessories and support equipment.

Though the D-20 system is capable of variable speeds from 1 to 60 frames per second, in RAW Data mode these are currently limited to 23.976 frame/s, 24 frame/s, 25 frame/s, 29.97 frame/s & 30 frame/s per second.

The sensitivity of the D-20 in video mode is regulated by the application of LUTs (Look Up Tables) prior to output. With sensitivity settings ranging from ISO 100 to ISO 800 with linear responses, the D-20 also offers log curve options designed to mimic the response of film negative. Unlike some other digital cameras, the D-20 does not offer gain boost, instead relying on the advantages of adding gain in the post production process. The sensitivity of the camera in Data mode is regulated by applying LUTs in the outboard processing of the image.

== Distinctive characteristics ==
Of the currently available high resolution digital motion picture cameras, the Dalsa Origin, the SI 2K and the D-20 feature detachable optical viewfinders.

Some advantages of an optical over purely electronic viewing systems include:

- extremely high viewfinder resolution, with the option to zoom in on the image to check critical focus
- ability to set camera framing without need of a power supply

Some disadvantages an optical viewing introduces to a camera system:

- loss of light and sensitivity, as light has to go to the viewfinder instead of the sensor
- no monitoring of what is recorded on the sensor, only what appears in front of the sensor.

Electronic viewing options can be added to the camera. Typically, an additional monitor is used to both view and evaluate images for the camera.

The D-20 also accepts a traditional film style video assist system, sharing the image available through the optical viewfinder. This can be useful in Steadicam and remote crane applications where visibility outside the sensor capture area is preferable.

Like Arri mechanical cameras, the D-20 is modularly constructed so that both the mechanical and electronic components are upgradable over time, the camera however was discontinued in 2008 and the D-21 was introduced.

== Films shot with Arriflex D-20 ==
- Luna
- The Bank Job
- RocknRolla
- The Andromeda Strain
- Uncertainty
- Captain Abu Raed

== Similar cameras ==
Other single-chip Super 35 mm film-sized digital motion picture cameras directly in competition with the D-20 include the Panavision Genesis camera, the Sony F35 camera and the Red One camera.
