= Panasonic AG-DVX100 =

Digital video camcorder

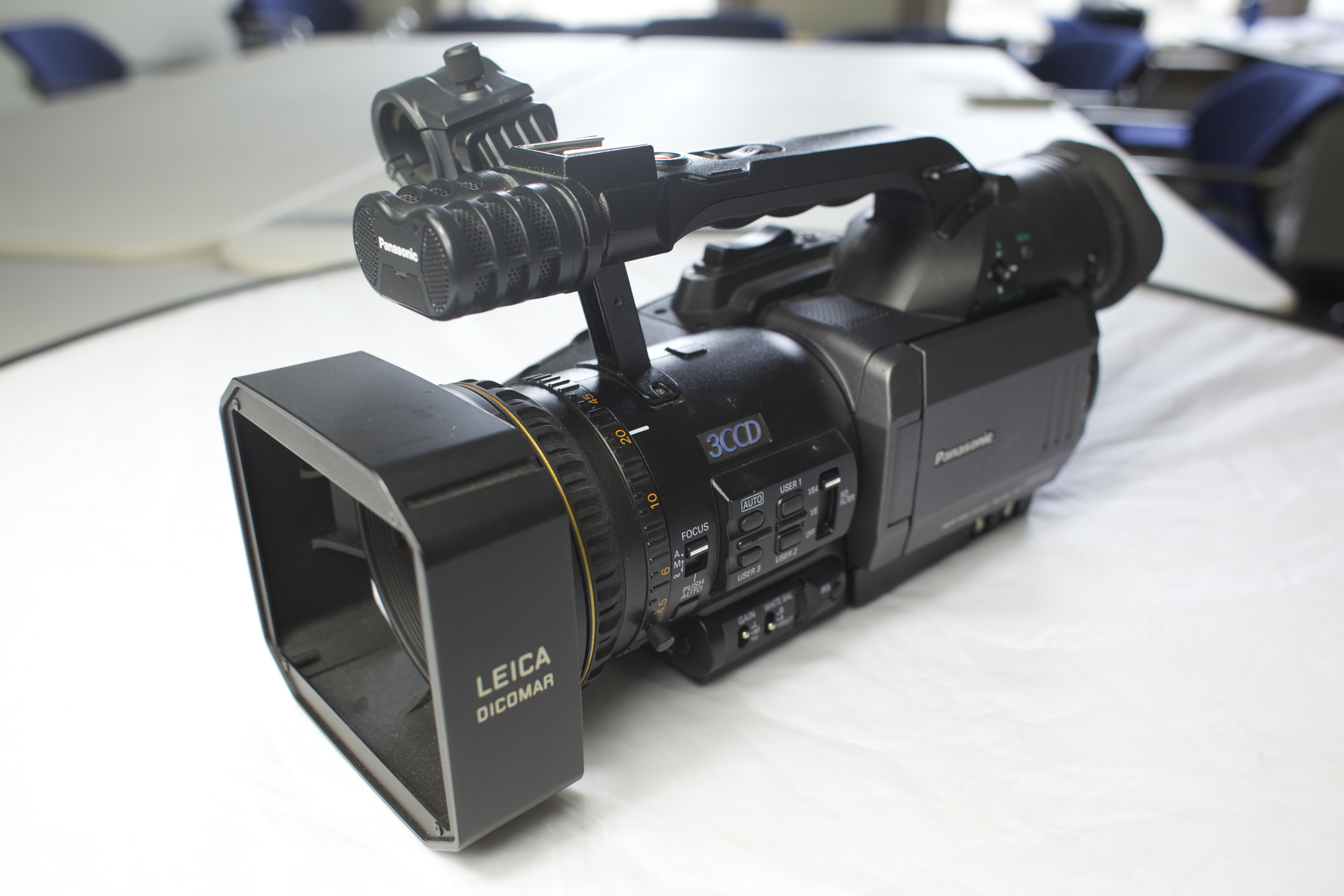
- The AG-DVX100B variant

Overview
- Maker: Panasonic
- Type: Digital camcorder
- Released: Original: October 13, 2002; DVX100A: January 2004; DVX100B: Late 2005
- Intro price: Original: US$3,795; DVX100A: US$3,995; DVX100B: US$3,995

Lens
- Lens mount: Fixed
- Lens: Fixed zoom lens

Sensor/medium
- Sensor type: 3 × 1/3" CCDs
- Recording medium: MiniDV tape

The Panasonic AG-DVX100 is a discontinued video camera released by Panasonic on October 13, 2002. It was one of the first consumer camcorders to record at 24 frames per second, the frame rate used in most films.

The camera recorded video on MiniDV tapes. It weighs 4.4 pounds, features two XLR audio inputs, FireWire/IEEE 1394, and a hand strap on the right side of the camera.

The AG-DVX100 was first succeeded by the AG-DVX100A in January 2004, and then the AG-DVX100B in Late 2005.

== Technical specifications ==
The AG-DVX100 series uses a three-CCD imaging system capable of recording video at 24 or 30 frames per second progressive scan, and 60 frames per second (50 in PAL) interlaced. For 24 frames per second recording, it supports 24p and 24pA recording modes using telecine pulldown methods (2:3 and 2:3:3:2). The camera features a "Cine-Like Gamma" function to produce images with a tonal quality similar to that of film.

All models use CCD sensors with 410,000 total pixels (approx. 380,000 effective).

The AG-DVX100 model only records footage in a 4:3 aspect ratio. The AG-DVX100A revision added support for 16:9 widescreen recording. However the 16:9 recording mode merely crops the original 4:3 image unless the user attaches a lens-based anamorphic adapter (such as Panasonic's own AG-LA7200G) that captures a wider horizontal field of view. On the AG-DVX100A, the 16:9 image is stretched vertically to fill the 4:3 viewscreen, but was updated to properly letterbox within it on the AG-DVX100B.

Audio inputs include two professional-grade XLR ports. For video transfer, the device includes IEEE 1394 (FireWire) digital cable ports, along with analog S-Video and RCA connections. Additional camera features include manual/servo zoom, handle-mounted zoom, record controls for low-angle shots, and neutral density (ND) filters. The AG-DVX100B added support for timecode synchronization with a second 100B model when connected with a Firewire cable.

The camera's built-in ND filters include ND1 (1/8 light reduction, ≈ 3 stops) and ND2 (1/64 light reduction, ≈ 6 stops), providing exposure control without changing the shutter speed.

== Use in film and television ==
The AG-DVX100 has been utilised by several independent filmmakers, television producers, and documentary creators, including:

- November (2004)
- Angry Video Game Nerd (from first episode to "close to episode 100")
- Murderball (2007) [Documentary]
- Iraq in Fragments (2006)
- It's Always Sunny in Philadelphia (AG-DVX100A; first five seasons)
- The Puffy Chair (2005)
- The Tracey Fragments (2007)
- Urchin (2007)
- Ghost Adventures
- Dust to Glory
- Nirvana the Band the Show
- Primetime (some shots)
