= Silicon Imaging =

2k digital video camera

The Silicon Imaging (SI-2K) was a 2K digital video camera built on a single 16 mm sized CMOS sensor manufactured by Altasens. It was able to record direct to disk in the compressed CineForm RAW format, and was notable for its tiny detachable camera head, which can be positioned up to 100m from the recording unit through an ethernet cable. Danny Boyle and his director of photography Anthony Dod Mantle used the camera on the films Slumdog Millionaire (Academy Award for Best Cinematography) and 127 Hours. The head and the recording unit together cost (c.a. 2011) $23,000. The head by itself costs $13,750, and could be used to record to a laptop that had appropriate specifications and software.

== Silicon Imaging 3D ==
At NAB 2009 Silicon Imaging unveiled the very first integrated 3D cinema camera and stereo visualization system, based on two SI-2K camera heads. The so-called SI-3D shoots uncompressed raw imagery from two synchronized cameras and encodes directly to a single stereo CineForm RAW file. Combining two cameras into a single control, processing and recording platform enables shooting and instant playback like a traditional 2D camera with the added tools needed on-set to analyze and adjust the lighting, color, flip orientation and stereo depth effects. In post, a unified stereo file plus associated metadata can be immediately graded for dailies, edited, and viewed in either 2D or 3D.
