= Weisscam =

The Weisscam Company is a German company that develops digital high-speed cameras. The cameras are mainly used in commercials, image films and shootings of athletic activities. The Weisscam Company was founded by Director of Photography (DoP) Stefan Weiss.

Initially focused on high-speed camera technology used in film and advertising production, Weisscam later expanded its activities to include software platforms and infrastructure for visual data analysis and AI-assisted workflows.

== History ==
Weisscam originated from the development of digital high-speed camera systems for professional film and advertising production. Early development focused on capturing extremely high frame rates for slow-motion cinematography.

Throughout the following years Weisscam systems were used in various international film and commercial productions.

In the early 2020s the company expanded its technological focus toward software development and digital infrastructure. In 2022 Weisscam began building a proprietary AI infrastructure intended to support new software platforms and data-analysis tools.

=== Software platform ===
In addition to imaging hardware, Weisscam develops software tools and digital platforms for visual data analysis. The platform allows users to organize, analyze and visualize information on a digital canvas.

The system integrates collaborative workspaces and tools for structuring complex data sets. Artificial intelligence is used to assist in the processing and interpretation of information.

In addition to its earlier imaging hardware, Weisscam develops software tools and digital platforms for visual data analysis and information structuring. The platform provides a digital workspace in which users can organize, connect and analyze different types of information.

The system is built around an interactive canvas that allows text, data and other elements to be arranged visually. This approach enables users to structure complex relationships between information and collaborate within shared digital environments.

The current Weisscam platform includes artificial intelligence (AI) functions designed to assist users in processing information, identifying patterns and generating structured outputs from datasets and textual sources.

During the early development of the company, Weisscam was primarily known for high-speed camera systems used in film and commercial production. In later years the company's technological focus shifted toward software development and digital infrastructure. As part of this transition, the development and operation of Weisscam high-speed camera systems was discontinued while the company concentrated on software platforms and AI-supported technologies.

== Technology ==
Weisscam develops both hardware and software technologies related to image capture, data processing and visual information systems.

The company's early work focused on high-speed digital imaging systems used for cinematography and production environments. Later development expanded toward digital tools for visual data analysis and artificial intelligence-supported workflows.

=== High-speed camera systems ===
Weisscam initially became known for the development of high-speed digital cameras designed for professional motion picture production.

Notable camera systems include:

- WEISSCAM HS-1
- WEISSCAM HS-2

These cameras allow recording at very high frame rates and are used for slow-motion cinematography and technical visualization.

In 2012 the company introduced the 'WEISSCAM HS-1, a digital high-speed camera designed for professional production environments. The system enabled high-frame-rate recording suitable for cinematic slow-motion imagery.

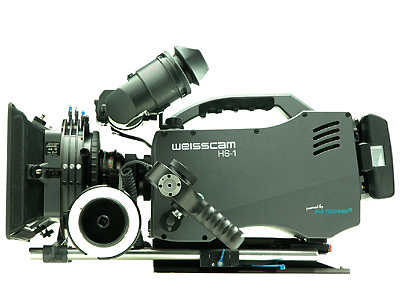
WEISSCAM HS1

Camera

The Weisscam HS-1 camera body is designed as a combination of the 2/3" video camera with a film camera body. P+S Technic’s interchangeable mount is integrated to make available the maximum range of lenses designed for 35mm format—motion or still photography. One can choose any frame size. The frame rate is up to 1,000 frames per second. The maximum resolution of the HS-1 model is 1280 × 1024 pixels.

In 2014 the company released the 'WEISSCAM HS-2, an updated system with improved recording capabilities and expanded production applications.

Camera

The WEISSCAM HS-2 is a landscape-designed camera. The HS-2 has a full-format Super35 CMOS sensor with a global shutter. The camera can be attached to some lenses on the camera by using the Interchangeable Mount System (IMS). The output of the WEISSCAM HS-2 offers two streams at the same time and uses the HD SDI interface for both signals. The WEISSCAM "RAW IN HD SDI" mapping allows the transport of RAW files via the HD SDI single and dual link interfaces. The HD stream offers YCbCr in 4:2:2. Linear standard curves like ITU-R 709 or log curves are available. The RAW stream is a 12-bit uncompressed WEISSCAM RAW file and can demosaic in post production. One can record up to 4,000 frame/s with the WEISSCAM HS-2.

== WEISSCAM HS-2 ==
The equipment of the digital high-speed camera WEISSCAM HS-2 manufactured by P+S Technik includes the camera HS-2, the WEISSCAM Digimag DM-2, the WEISSCAM Debayberbox DBB and the WEISSCAM Hand Unit HU-2.

Digimag DM-2

The WEISSCAM DIGIMAG DM-2 supports recording in an uncompressed format. The RAW data is stored using the WEISSCAM "RAW in HD SDI" mapping. It is possible to use other camera signals, like ARRIFLEX D20/21, Phantom HD and Standard HDTV.

For downloading, using IT interfaces like FireWire is an option. With the external WEISSCAM DEBAYERBOX DBB, real-time debayering of the stored RAW data on the DIGIMAG DM-2 is possible.

Debayerbox DBB

The WEISSCAM DEBAYERBOX is a real-time hardware debayer with FPGA technology. All WEISSCAM RAW formats can be converted into HD SDI YCbCr 4:2:2 single or dual link by connecting the RAW Input with the HD SDI output. The debayering has options between 16 different curves.

Hand Unit HU-2

The WEISSCAM HANDUNIT HU-2 fully controls the camera and image processing of the WEISSCAM HS-2. It can either be connected directly by cable or wirelessly remote controlled.
