= Genesis (camera) =

Panavision digital movie camera

Panavision Genesis
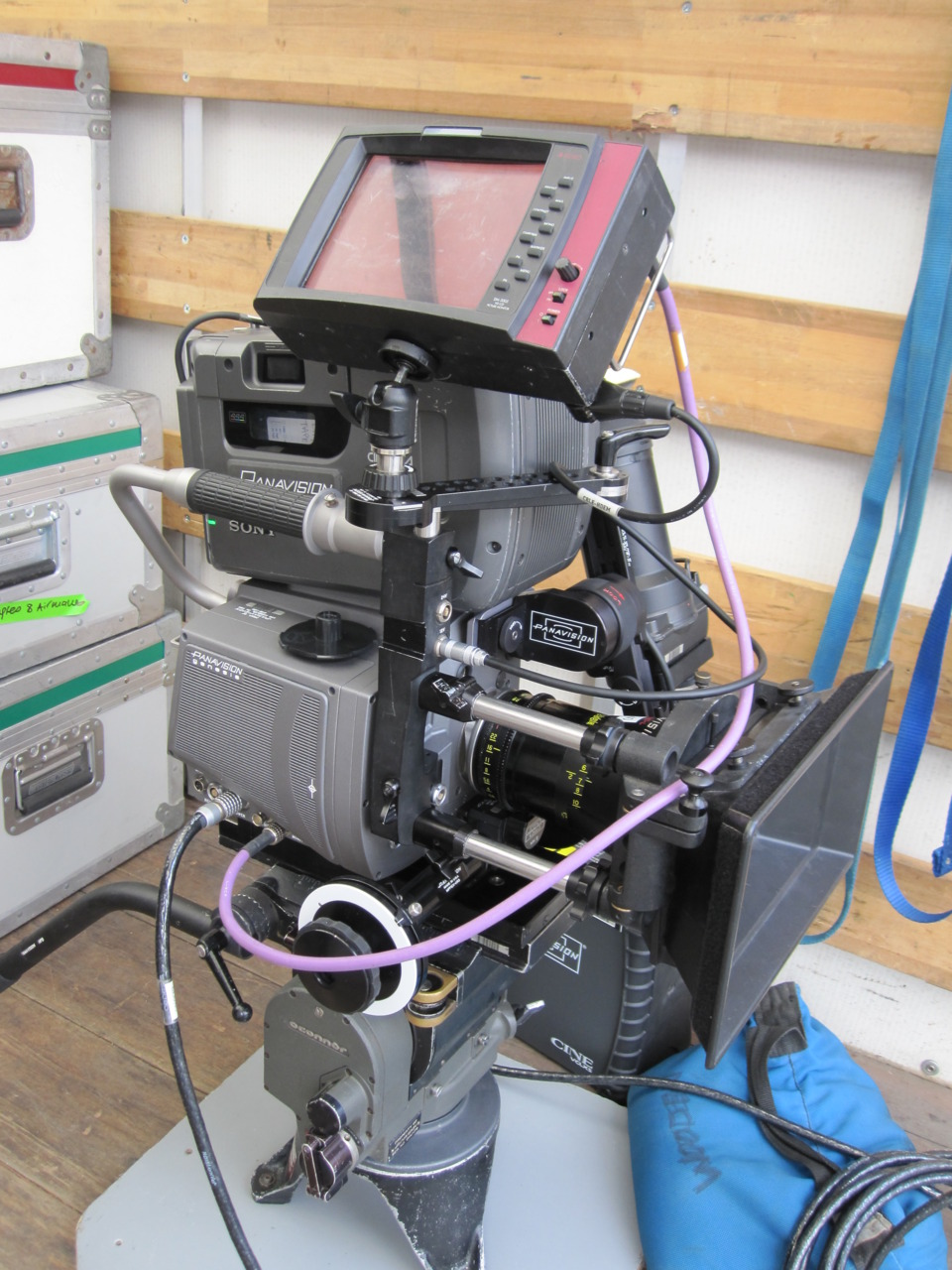
- A Genesis camera on the set of Love.
- Manufacturer: Panavision
- Introduced: 2005
- Gauge: Super 35 (3-Perf)
- Speed: 1 to 50 frames per second

The Genesis is a discontinued high-end digital movie camera developed by Panavision, and was available solely by rental. It is based on a proprietary Super 35 1.78:1 (16:9) aspect ratio, 12.4-megapixel, RGB filtered CCD sensor. It was first used by a feature crew to shoot Bryan Singer's Superman Returns, and was shortly followed up thereafter by the World War I film Flyboys. However, the computer effect-heavy nature of these two movies meant that ultimately the comedy Scary Movie 4 was the first theatrically released feature primarily shot with the Genesis. It was discontinued in 2012 and succeeded by the Millennium DXL line developed with Red Digital Cinema.

== Background ==
Unlike the 2/3" 3-CCD imaging system used in Sony's HDW-F900 CineAlta camera (used in Attack of the Clones), the Genesis uses a single 12.4 megapixel CCD chip with the same width as a Super 35 mm film frame. The "Panavized" CineAltas did not use Panavision's existing range of 35 mm film lenses and have different depth-of-field characteristics.

Most photographic lenses designed for film cameras cannot be adapted to work on 3-chip video cameras. In many cases, the prism block simply leaves no room for the rear element of the lens. In cases where the lens does fit, the resulting optical aberrations created by the prism (primarily spherical) would destroy image quality. Apart from this, the sensors on a "2/3 inch" video camera are closer in size to a 16 mm film frame and so would produce a similar depth of field.

Panavision originally tried to overcome this problem with optical adaptors that fit between the cine lens and the video camera, but these have all produced an unacceptable drop in image quality. Most productions using the Sony HDCAM cameras therefore used lenses from Zeiss, Angenieux, Canon or Fujinon.

Apart from this, there were a number of operational problems with both the lenses and cameras used for Attack of the Clones, and so for Star Wars: Episode III – Revenge of the Sith, George Lucas severed his long-standing relationship with Panavision in 2003, obtaining newer-model Sony HDC-F950 cameras and lenses from Plus8Digital instead.

In an attempt to address these and other problems, Panavision followed this up in 2004 with the Genesis, a full bandwidth (4:4:4) camera with improved colorimetry and sensitometry-related specs and, probably most importantly, a Super 35 mm film-sized recording area, thus making it focally compatible with regular Cine Primo lenses and giving a true 35 mm depth of field.

== Technical specification ==
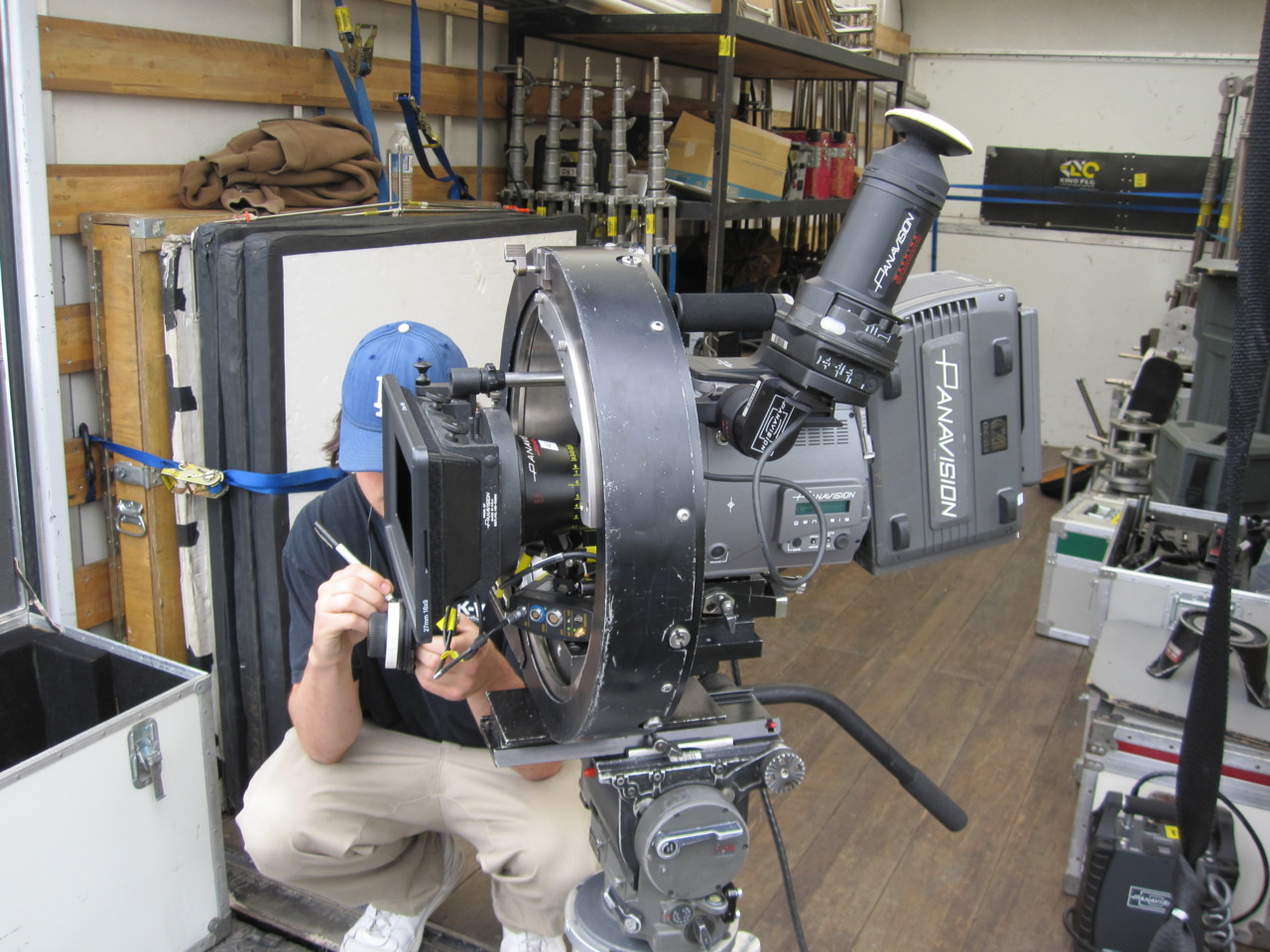
A Genesis in a 360 mount.

The Genesis uses a 12.4 megapixel CCD chip, arranged in a 5760x2160 horizontally RGB filtered array. The resolution is resampled by pixel binning to a final output pixel resolution of 1920x1080. The chip has a 16:9 (1.78:1) aspect ratio, similar in size to Super 35 3-Perf film. The CCD active area is .930 in. x .523 in. This is a significant breakthrough in that it allows just about any Panavision spherical 35 mm cine lens to be used. The main imaging module of the Genesis is made by Sony, but the exact relationship between the two companies is unclear, since their joint partnership was dissolved in 2004 with Panavision's re-purchase of the 8% shareholding Sony bought in 2000.

The Genesis can record in a custom Panalog color space, using a log tone-curve to preserve highlight detail that would be lost with typical video gamma correction. The calibration differs from the Cineon log format used for film post-production.

Panavision uses the Sony HDVF-C30W TFT color LCD viewfinder (960x540 pixels), which is compatible with both the CineAlta and the Genesis cameras. A Digital cinema camera competitor to the Genesis, the D-20, incorporates a reflex optical viewfinder to address this concern. Other similar HD-resolution cameras are the Sony F35, ARRI Alexa, and RedOne.

The last major studio film to use the Panavision Genesis was the 2012 comedy Ted. Due to lack of demand, Panavision discontinued the Genesis in 2012 and began renting newer cameras such as the Arri Alexa, Sony Cinealta, and Red Digital Cinema cameras, while continuing to develop their own next generation digital camera. In 2016, Panavision introduced the Millennium DXL, based on the Red 8K Weapon, followed by a number of additional models like the DXL2 in 2018.

== Filmography ==
=== 2006 ===
- Apocalypto
- Click
- Déjà Vu
- Flyboys
- La Maison du Bonheur
- Scary Movie IV
- Superman Returns
- The Fast And The Furious: Tokyo Drift
- Janet Jackson - "So Excited" music video

=== 2007 ===
- Balls of Fury
- Before the Devil Knows You're Dead
- The Comebacks
- The Condemned
- Christmas in Wonderland
- Fantastic Four: Rise of the Silver Surfer (limited portions)
- The Ferryman
- Grindhouse (Planet Terror only)
- His Majesty Minor
- I Now Pronounce You Chuck and Larry
- The Lookout
- Next
- O kadin
- Reign Over Me
- Slipstream
- Superbad
- Walk Hard: The Dewey Cox Story
- Ghost Rider (2007 film)

=== 2008 ===
- 21
- An American Carol
- Asterix at the Olympic Games
- Bedtime Stories
- Deception
- Get Smart
- The House Bunny
- Light (film)
- My Night with Annabel
- The Other Boleyn Girl
- Repo! The Genetic Opera
- The Rocker
- The Spirit
- Saw V
- Sunshine on Sale
- You Don't Mess with the Zohan
- X-Files: I Want to Believe (action sequences)

=== 2009 ===
- Fired Up! (as Panavision Digital Imagining)
- 2012
- Zombieland
- Paul Blart: Mall Cop
- I Come with the Rain
- Alabama Moon
- Accidents Happen
- The Alice Winter
- Dirty Sex
- Everybody's Fine
- Bestevenner
- Commentary
- Fast & Furious
- Hachi: A Dog's Tale
- X-Men Origins: Wolverine
- Terminator Salvation
- Transformers: Revenge of the Fallen
- Underworld: Rise of the Lycans

=== 2010 ===
- Alice in Wonderland
- Date Night
- Death at a Funeral
- Easy A
- Grown Ups
- Remember Me
- Predators
- Mysteries of Lisbon
- Machete
- SGU: Stargate Universe
- Wasted on the Young
- Takers
- The A-Team (film)
- Knight and Day
- Salt (2010 film)

=== 2011 ===
- Horrible Bosses
- Captain America: The First Avenger
- Immortals
- Bucky Larson:Born to Be a Star
- Take This Waltz
- Texas Killing Fields
- Fast Five
- Transformers: Dark of the Moon
- The Smurfs

=== 2012 ===
- Ted

=== 2014 ===
- Heaven Is for Real

=== Television series ===
Television series shot with the Panavision Genesis include Scrubs, Californication, Outsourced, United States of Tara, Mercy, Stargate Universe, Night Stalker, Conviction, What About Brian, Justice, 3 Lbs., Cranford and 90210.

Some television pilots shot with the Genesis include Faceless, In Case of Emergency, Brothers & Sisters, 52 Fights, and Protégé.
