= Super 35 =

Motion picture film format

Comparing the film area of Super 35 (framed for 2.39) to CinemaScope, standard widescreen and Techniscope

Super 35 (originally known as Superscope 235) is a motion picture film format that uses exactly the same film stock as standard 35 mm film, but puts a larger image frame on that stock by using the space normally reserved for the optical analog sound track.

== History ==
Super 35 was revived from a similar Superscope variant known as Superscope 235, which was originally developed by the Tushinsky Brothers (who founded Superscope Inc. in 1954) for RKO in 1954. The first film to be shot in Superscope was Vera Cruz, a western film produced by Hecht-Lancaster Productions and distributed through United Artists.

When cameraman Joe Dunton was preparing to shoot Dance Craze in 1980, he chose to revive the Superscope format by using a full silent-standard gate and slightly optically recentering the lens port (to adjust for the inclusion of the area of the optical soundtrack – the gray track on left side of the illustration). These two characteristics are central to the format.

It was adopted by Hollywood starting with Greystoke in 1984, under the format name Super Techniscope. It also received much early publicity for making the cockpit shots in Top Gun possible, since it was otherwise impossible to fit 35 mm cameras with large anamorphic lenses into the small free space in the cockpit. Later, as other camera rental houses and labs started to embrace the format, Super 35 became popular in the mid-1990s, and soon thereafter became a ubiquitous production format – particularly among visual effects-driven films, as the unused frame area allowed greater flexibility in motion tracking and CGI-related tasks.

== Variants ==
=== 35mm ===
When composing for 1.85:1, it is known as Super 1.85, since it was larger than standard 1.85.

When composing for 2.39:1, there are two methods most frequently used: common center, which keeps the 2.39 extraction area at the center of the film, and common top, which shifts the 2.39 extraction area upwards on the film so that it shares a common top line with a centered 1.85:1 frame. Proponents of the common-top method have included James Cameron, Martin Scorsese and Gore Verbinski, as it allowed 4:3 home video versions to be made with similar framing. This method did present minor issues, such as necessitating tilting during zooms, and could also result in off-center lens flares. As 16:9 televisions increased in popularity, it became more practical for productions to use the common center method.

=== Digital ===
Many of the first digital cinema cameras used Super 35-sized sensors, as it allowed compatibility with existing cinema lenses. Today, many of the most widely-used digital cinema cameras, including the Red Epic and Arri Alexa, have Super 35-sized sensors.

== Details ==
Super 35 is a production format. Theatres do not receive or project Super 35 prints. Rather, films are shot in a Super 35 format but are then – either through optical blowdown/matting or digital intermediate – converted into one of the standard formats to make release prints. Because of this, often productions also use Super 35's width in conjunction with a 3-perf negative pulldown to save costs on "wasted" frame area shot and accommodate camera magazines that could shoot 33% longer in time with the same length of film.

If using 4-perf, the Super 35 exposure area is 24.89 mm × 18.66 mm (0.980 in × 0.735 in), compared to the standard Academy 35 mm film size of 21.95 mm × 16.00 mm (0.864 in × 0.630 in) and thus provides 32% more image area than the standard 35-mm format. 4-perf Super 35 is simply the original frame size that was used in 35 mm silent films. That is, it is a return to the way the film stock was used before the frame size was cropped to allow room for a soundtrack.

Super 35 competes with the use of the standard 35 mm format used with an anamorphic lens. In this comparison, advocates of Super 35 claim an advantage in production costs and flexibility; when used to make 2.39:1 theatrical prints and the ability to format the film for TV, detractors complain of a loss in quality, due to less negative area used and more lab intermediate steps (if done optically).

== Aspect ratio ==
Super 35 uses standard "spherical" camera lenses, which are faster, smaller, and cheaper to rent – a factor in low-budget production – and provide a wider range of lens choices to the cinematographer. The chief advantage of Super 35 for productions is its adaptability to different release formats. Super 35 negatives can be used to produce high-quality releases in any aspect ratio, as the final frame is extracted and converted from the larger full frame negative. This also means that a full-frame video release can actually display more of the frame than the theatrical release (Open matte), provided that the extra frame space is "protected for" during filming. Generally the aspect ratio(s) and extraction method (either from a common center or common topline) must be chosen by the director of photography ahead of time, so the correct ground glass can be created to let the camera operator see where the extracted frame is.

Super 35 ratios have included:

- 1.33:1 (4:3 full screen video)
- 1.78:1 (16:9, widescreen video)
- 1.85:1 ("flat" print) (Super 1.85)
- 2.00:1 (Univisium)
- 2.20:1 (70mm print)
- 2.39:1 (anamorphic print)

1.66:1 and 1.75:1 have been indicated in some Super 35 frame leader charts, although generally they have not been used for Super 35 productions due to both relative lack of usage since the rise of Super 35 and their greater use of negative frame space by virtue of their increased vertical dimension.

Theoretically, 2.39:1 release prints made from Super 35 should have slightly lower technical quality than films produced directly in the anamorphic format. Because part of the Super 35 image is thrown away when printing to this format, films originated with anamorphic lenses use a larger negative area. Super 35 has continually been popular with television shows, due to the lack of a need for a final release print; with the advent of widescreen television sets, 3-perf Super 35 – with a native 1.78:1 (16:9) ratio – was widely used for widescreen television shows until the advent of digital shooting. 3-perf Super 35 was also used for some time for feature films in 1.85:1 & 2.39:1, and the digital intermediate process made it more attractive because it allowed the optical processing formerly required to be skipped entirely.

== Examples ==
Director	Year	Title	Notes
James Cameron	1989	The Abyss	Common top
James Cameron	1991	Terminator 2: Judgment Day	Common top
James Cameron	1994	True Lies	Common top
James Cameron	1997	Titanic	
Kathryn Bigelow	1991	Point Break	
Kathryn Bigelow	1995	Strange Days	
Kathryn Bigelow	2002	K-19: The Widowmaker	
Claude Lelouch	1994	Les misérables	
Claude Lelouch	1996	Hommes, femmes, mode d'emploi	
Claude Lelouch	1999	Une pour toutes	
Claude Lelouch	2002	And Now... Ladies and Gentlemen	
Lawrence Kasdan	1985	Silverado	
Lawrence Kasdan	2003	Dreamcatcher	
Tony Scott	1986	Top Gun	
Tony Scott	1987	Beverly Hills Cop II	
Tony Scott	2004	Man on Fire	
Tony Scott	2005	Domino	
Tony Scott	2006	Déjà Vu	Scenes that were not shot on Panavision Genesis
Tony Scott	2009	The Taking of Pelham 123	
Tony Scott	2010	Unstoppable	
Ridley Scott	1989	Black Rain	
Ridley Scott	2000	Gladiator	
Ridley Scott	2001	Black Hawk Down	
Ridley Scott	2005	Kingdom of Heaven	
Ridley Scott	2006	A Good Year	
Ridley Scott	2008	Body of Lies	
Ridley Scott	2010	Robin Hood	
Wolfgang Petersen	1985	Enemy Mine	
Wolfgang Petersen	1997	Air Force One	Common top
Wolfgang Petersen	2004	Troy	
Wolfgang Petersen	2006	Poseidon	
John Hughes	1986	Ferris Bueller's Day Off	Common top
John Badham	1990	Bird on a Wire	Common top
Jack Nicholson	1990	The Two Jakes	Super 1.85
Francis Ford Coppola	1990	The Godfather Part III	Super 1.85
The Wachowskis	1999	The Matrix	
The Wachowskis	2003	The Matrix Reloaded	
The Wachowskis	2003	The Matrix Revolutions	
The Wachowskis	2012	Cloud Atlas	3-perf
Ron Howard	1991	Backdraft	Common top
Ron Howard	1995	Apollo 13	Common top
Ron Howard	2003	The Missing	
Ron Howard	2005	Cinderella Man	
Ron Howard	2006	The Da Vinci Code	
Ron Howard	2008	Frost/Nixon	
Ron Howard	2009	Angels & Demons	
Ron Howard	2011	The Dilemma	
John Milius	1991	Flight of the Intruder	
Nicholas Meyer	1991	Star Trek VI: The Undiscovered Country	
Quentin Tarantino	1992	Reservoir Dogs	
Quentin Tarantino	2003	Kill Bill: Volume 1	3-perf
Quentin Tarantino	2004	Kill Bill: Volume 2	3-perf
Quentin Tarantino	2007	Death Proof	3-perf
Quentin Tarantino	2019	Once Upon a Time...in Hollywood	"The 14 Fists of McCluskey" sequence Super 1.85 3-perf
James Ivory	1992	Howards End	
James Ivory	1993	The Remains of the Day	
Martin Scorsese	1993	The Age of Innocence	Common top
Martin Scorsese	1995	Casino	Common top
Martin Scorsese	1997	Kundun	Common top
Martin Scorsese	2002	Gangs of New York	Common top
Martin Scorsese	2004	The Aviator	3-perf
Martin Scorsese	2006	The Departed	Common top
Martin Scorsese	2010	Shutter Island	3-perf
Martin Scorsese	2013	The Wolf of Wall Street	Scenes not filmed in anamorphic 35mm
Martin Scorsese	2019	The Irishman	Super 1.85 3-perf
Peter Jackson	1994	Heavenly Creatures	
Peter Jackson	1996	The Frighteners	
Peter Jackson	2001	The Fellowship of the Ring	
Peter Jackson	2002	The Two Towers	
Peter Jackson	2003	The Return of the King	
Peter Jackson	2005	King Kong	
Peter Jackson	2009	The Lovely Bones	
Bryan Singer	1995	The Usual Suspects	
Bryan Singer	1998	Apt Pupil	
Bryan Singer	2003	X2: X-Men United	Common top
Bryan Singer	2008	Valkyrie	Super 1.85
Paul Verhoeven	1995	Showgirls	Common top
Paul Verhoeven	2006	Black Book	
John Woo	1996	Broken Arrow	
John Woo	2002	Windtalkers	
John Woo	2008-2009	Red Cliff	
Michael Bay	1996	The Rock	
Michael Bay	2003	Bad Boys II	
Woody Allen	2011	Midnight in Paris	Super 1.85 3-perf
Woody Allen	2012	To Rome with Love	Super 1.85
Woody Allen	2013	Blue Jasmine	3-perf
Sylvester Stallone	2008	Rambo	
Sylvester Stallone	2010	The Expendables	3-perf
Roland Emmerich	1996	Independence Day	Common top
Roland Emmerich	1998	Godzilla	Common top
Roland Emmerich	2000	The Patriot	
Roland Emmerich	2004	The Day After Tomorrow	Common third
Roland Emmerich	2008	10,000 BC	Common third
Roland Emmerich	2009	2012	Scenes that were not shot on Panavision Genesis
Paul Thomas Anderson	1996	Hard Eight	
Paul Thomas Anderson	2025	One Battle After Another	Scenes that were not shot on VistaVision; Super 1.85
Roger Donaldson	1997	Dante's Peak	
Roger Donaldson	2003	The Recruit	
Gregory Nava	1997	Selena	
Curtis Hanson	1997	L.A. Confidential	
Curtis Hanson	2000	Wonder Boys	
Curtis Hanson	2002	8 Mile	
Curtis Hanson	2005	In Her Shoes	
Curtis Hanson	2007	Lucky You	
Oliver Stone	1999	Any Given Sunday	
Oliver Stone	2004	Alexander	
Oliver Stone	2006	World Trade Center	Super 1.85
Oliver Stone	2008	W.	3-perf
Oliver Stone	2010	Wall Street: Money Never Sleeps	3-perf
John Singleton	2000	Shaft	
John Singleton	2003	2 Fast 2 Furious	
John Singleton	2005	Four Brothers	
John Singleton	2011	Abduction	
The Coen Brothers	2000	O Brother, Where Art Thou?	
The Coen Brothers	2001	The Man Who Wasn't There	
The Coen Brothers	2007	No Country for Old Men	
The Coen Brothers	2009	A Serious Man	Super 1.85 3-perf
The Coen Brothers	2010	True Grit	3-perf
The Coen Brothers	2016	Hail, Caesar!	Super 1.85 3-perf
Roman Polanski	1999	The Ninth Gate	
Roman Polanski	2005	Oliver Twist	
Roman Polanski	2010	The Ghost Writer	
Roman Polanski	2011	Carnage	3-perf
Lars von Trier	1996	Breaking the Waves	
Ang Lee	2000	Crouching Tiger, Hidden Dragon	
Antoine Fuqua	1998	The Replacement Killers	
Antoine Fuqua	2000	Bait	
Antoine Fuqua	2004	King Arthur	
Antoine Fuqua	2009	Brooklyn's Finest	3-perf
Antoine Fuqua	2013	Olympus Has Fallen	3-perf
McG	2000	Charlie's Angels	
McG	2003	Charlie's Angels: Full Throttle	
McG	2006	We Are Marshall	
McG	2009	Terminator Salvation	
McG	2012	This Means War	
D. J. Caruso	2004	Taking Lives	
D. J. Caruso	2005	Two for the Money	
D. J. Caruso	2008	Eagle Eye	Common top
D. J. Caruso	2011	I Am Number Four	Super 1.85
Baz Luhrmann	2001	Moulin Rouge!	Visual effects
Baz Luhrmann	2008	Australia	
Luc Besson	1997	The Fifth Element	
Luc Besson	1999	The Messenger: The Story of Joan of Arc	
Luc Besson	2005	Angel-A	
Luc Besson	2006	Arthur and the Invisibles	
Luc Besson	2009	Arthur and the Revenge of Maltazard	
Luc Besson	2010	The Extraordinary Adventures of Adèle Blanc-Sec	3-perf
Luc Besson	2010	Arthur 3: The War of the Two Worlds	
Luc Besson	2011	The Lady	
Sam Mendes	1999	American Beauty	
Sam Mendes	2002	Road to Perdition	
Sam Mendes	2005	Jarhead	
Sam Mendes	2008	Revolutionary Road	
Sam Mendes	2009	Away We Go	
Steven Spielberg	2002	Minority Report	
Steven Spielberg	2005	Munich	
Steven Spielberg	2011	War Horse	
Steven Spielberg	2012	Lincoln	3-perf
Steven Spielberg	2017	The Post	Super 1.85 3-perf
Steven Spielberg	2022	The Fabelmans	Super 1.85 3-perf
Peter Berg	2003	The Rundown	
Peter Berg	2004	Friday Night Lights	
Peter Berg	2007	The Kingdom	
Peter Berg	2008	Hancock	
Peter Berg	2012	Battleship	Visual effects
Sam Raimi	2004	Spider-Man 2	
Sam Raimi	2007	Spider-Man 3	
Sam Raimi	2009	Drag Me to Hell	Common top
Sean McNamara	2004	Raise Your Voice	
Sean McNamara	2007	Bratz: The Movie	
Sean McNamara	2011	Soul Surfer	
Guy Ritchie	2005	Revolver	
Guy Ritchie	2009	Sherlock Holmes	Super 1.85
Guy Ritchie	2011	Sherlock Holmes: A Game of Shadows	
Tim Burton	2005	Charlie and the Chocolate Factory	Super 1.85
Tim Burton	2007	Sweeney Todd: The Demon Barber of Fleet Street	Super 1.85
Tim Burton	2010	Alice in Wonderland	Opening and closing bookends Super 1.85
Tim Burton	2012	Dark Shadows	Super 1.85
Chris Columbus	2001	Harry Potter and the Philosopher's Stone	
Chris Columbus	2002	Harry Potter and the Chamber of Secrets	
Chris Columbus	2005	Rent	
Chris Columbus	2010	Percy Jackson & the Olympians: The Lightning Thief	
Alfonso Cuarón	2004	Harry Potter and the Prisoner of Azkaban	
Alfonso Cuarón	2006	Children of Men	Super 1.85
Mike Newell	1997	Donnie Brasco	Common Top
Mike Newell	1999	Pushing Tin	
Mike Newell	2005	Harry Potter and the Goblet of Fire	
Mike Newell	2007	Love in the Time of Cholera	3-perf
Mike Newell	2010	Prince of Persia: The Sands of Time	
David Yates	2007	Harry Potter and the Order of the Phoenix	
David Yates	2009	Harry Potter and the Half-Blood Prince	
David Yates	2010	Harry Potter and the Deathly Hallows - Part 1	
David Yates	2011	Harry Potter and the Deathly Hallows - Part 2	
Zack Snyder	2004	Dawn of the Dead	
Zack Snyder	2006	300	
Zack Snyder	2009	Watchmen	
Zack Snyder	2011	Sucker Punch	
Zack Snyder	2017	Justice League	Super 1.85
Zack Snyder	2021	Zack Snyder's Justice League	Director's cut of the theatrical film, presented full-frame.
Paul Feig	2006	Unaccompanied Minors	
Paul Feig	2011	Bridesmaids	
Paul Feig	2013	The Heat	3-perf
Jon Favreau	2008	Iron Man	
Jon Favreau	2010	Iron Man 2	
Trey Parker	2004	Team America: World Police	
Joe Johnston	2010	The Wolfman	Super 1.85
Joe Johnston	2011	Captain America: The First Avenger	Scenes that were not shot on Panavision Genesis
Joe Johnston	2018	The Nutcracker and the Four Realms	Reshoots; Super 1.85 3-perf Shots that were not Filmed in Panavision Super 70mm
Rupert Sanders	2012	Snow White and the Huntsman	Visual effects
David Fincher	1995	Se7en	
David Fincher	1997	The Game	Fincher third
David Fincher	1999	Fight Club	Fincher third
David Fincher	2002	Panic Room	Fincher third 3-perf
Jonathan Mostow	1997	Breakdown	Common top
Jonathan Mostow	2000	U-571	
Jonathan Mostow	2003	Terminator 3: Rise of the Machines	Common top
Jonathan Mostow	2009	Surrogates	
Andrew Adamson	2005	The Chronicles of Narnia: The Lion, the Witch and the Wardrobe	
Andrew Adamson	2008	The Chronicles of Narnia: Prince Caspian	
Judd Apatow	2015	Trainwreck	3-perf
Judd Apatow	2020	The King of Staten Island	3-perf
Patty Jenkins	2017	Wonder Woman	
Patty Jenkins	2020	Wonder Woman 1984	Scenes that were not shot on IMAX film
Joel Schumacher	2002	Bad Company	Common top
Joel Schumacher	2002	Phone Booth	Common top
Joel Schumacher	2003	Veronica Guerin	
Joss Whedon	2005	Serenity	
Joss Whedon	2012	Marvel's The Avengers	High-speed shots Super 1.85
Tim Hill	2007	Alvin and the Chipmunks	Super 1.85
Tim Hill	2011	Hop	Super 1.85
Mimi Leder	1997	The Peacemaker	
Mimi Leder	1998	Deep Impact	
Spike Lee	2002	25th Hour	
Spike Lee	2006	Inside Man	
Spike Lee	2008	Miracle at St. Anna	
Richard Curtis	2003	Love Actually	
Richard Curtis	2009	The Boat That Rocked	
Park Chan-wook	2000	Joint Security Area	
Park Chan-wook	2002	Sympathy for Mr. Vengeance	
Park Chan-wook	2003	Oldboy	
Park Chan-wook	2005	Lady Vengeance	
Park Chan-wook	2009	Thirst	
Park Chan-wook	2013	Stoker	3-perf
Jean-Pierre Jeunet	1997	Alien Resurrection	
Jean-Pierre Jeunet	2001	Amélie	
Jean-Pierre Jeunet	2004	A Very Long Engagement	
Jean-Pierre Jeunet	2009	Micmacs	3-perf
Martin McDonagh	2008	In Bruges	3-perf
Martin McDonagh	2012	Seven Psychopaths	3-perf
Ben Affleck	2010	The Town	
Ben Affleck	2012	Argo	Some scenes
Gore Verbinski	2001	The Mexican	Common top
Gore Verbinski	2003	Pirates of the Caribbean: The Curse of the Black Pearl	Common top
Gore Verbinski	2006	Pirates of the Caribbean: Dead Man's Chest	Common top
Gore Verbinski	2007	Pirates of the Caribbean: At World's End	Common top
Steven Soderbergh	2001	Ocean's Eleven	Common top
Steven Soderbergh	2004	Ocean's Twelve	Common top
Steven Soderbergh	2007	Ocean's Thirteen	Common top
Alex Proyas	1998	Dark City	Common top
Alex Proyas	2004	I, Robot	
Danny Boyle	1997	A Life Less Ordinary	
Danny Boyle	2000	The Beach	
Danny Boyle	2007	Sunshine	Some scenes
Danny Boyle	2008	Slumdog Millionaire	3-perf
Danny Boyle	2015	Steve Jobs	3-perf, some scenes
Kevin Smith	1999	Dogma	Common top
Kevin Smith	2001	Jay and Silent Bob Strike Back	
Ben Stiller	1996	The Cable Guy	Common top
Ben Stiller	2001	Zoolander	
Ben Stiller	2008	Tropic Thunder	
Ben Stiller	2013	The Secret Life of Walter Mitty	Some scenes
Jon Turteltaub	2004	National Treasure	
Jon Turteltaub	2007	National Treasure: Book of Secrets	
Jon Turteltaub	2010	The Sorcerer's Apprentice	
Jay Roach	1997	Austin Powers: International Man of Mystery	
Jay Roach	1999	Austin Powers: The Spy Who Shagged Me	Common third
Jay Roach	2002	Austin Powers in Goldmember	Common top
Christopher Nolan	2005	Batman Begins	Special effects shots
Christopher Nolan	2023	Oppenheimer	Special effects shots that weren't shot with IMAX film cameras.

Franchises that used the Super 35 format include The Matrix, The Fast and the Furious, Harry Potter, Bourne, the first three Pirates of the Caribbean movies, National Treasure, the first two The Chronicles of Narnia movies, the first three live-action Alvin and the Chipmunks movies (Super 1.85), and The Twilight Saga.

== See also ==
- List of film formats
- Full frame
- Maxivision
- Negative pulldown
