= APV =

APV may refer to:

== Science and technology ==
- APV (NMDAR antagonist), or AP5, a selective NMDA receptor antagonist
- Advanced Professional Video, a video codec

== Transportation ==
- Apple Valley Airport (California) (IATA airport code), US
- Chevrolet Lumina APV, a minivan manufactured and marketed by General Motors
- Suzuki APV, a microvan manufactured and marketed by Suzuki
- Approach Procedure with Vertical guidance, a type of instrument approach in aviation

=== Military ===
- Armored protected vehicle, a kind of armoured fighting vehicle
- Transport and aircraft ferry (US Navy hull classification symbol: APV); see List of auxiliaries of the United States Navy

== Other uses ==
- Alavuden Peli-Veikot, a multi-sport club in Alavus, Finland
- Allen Parkway Village, a housing development in Fourth Ward, Houston, US
- Actuarial present value, a probability weighted present value often used in insurance
- Adjusted present value, a variation of the net present value, in finance
- APV plc, a former company making process equipment
- Asia Pacific Vision, a television content provider
