= Panasonic Lumix DC-GH7 =

Panasonic LUMIX DC-GH7
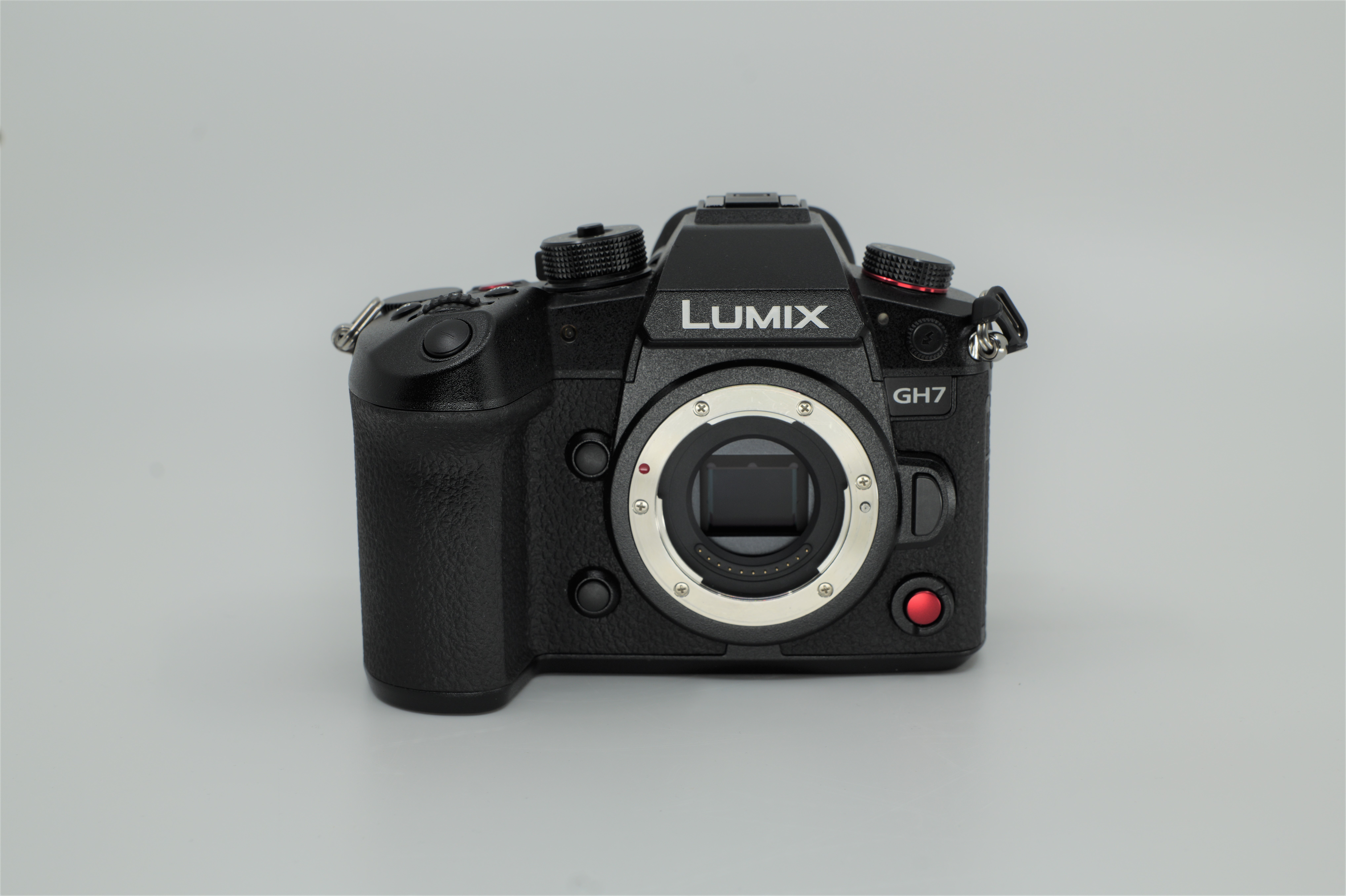
- Panasonic LUMIX GH7 mirrorless camera from the front

Overview
- Maker: Panasonic Corporation
- Type: Mirrorless interchangeable-lens digital camera (SLR-style body)
- Released: July 26, 2024; 23 months ago

Lens
- Lens mount: Micro Four Thirds mount
- Lens: Micro Four Thirds interchangeable lens system
- Compatible lenses: Micro Four Thirds lenses

Sensor/medium
- Sensor: Four Thirds digital sensor
- Sensor type: 25.2 MP BSI CMOS (digital)
- Sensor size: 17.3 × 13.0 mm
- Sensor maker: Sony Semiconductor Manufacturing Corporation
- Maximum resolution: ~25.2 megapixels (5776 × 4336)
- Recording medium: CFexpress Type B, SD/SDHC/SDXC (UHS-II), external USB SSD supported

Focusing
- Focus: Autofocus / Manual focus
- Focus modes: AFS (Single), AFC (Continuous), MF, AFF
- Focus areas: Multiple selectable (incl. AI subject detection/tracking)
- Focus bracketing: Yes

Exposure/metering
- Exposure: TTL metering
- Exposure bracketing: Yes
- Exposure modes: Program AE, Aperture Priority, Shutter Priority, Manual, Custom
- Metering modes: Multiple / Center-weighted / Spot / Highlight weighted

Flash
- Flash: No built-in flash; external supported
- Flash exposure compensation: Yes
- Flash synchronization: 1/250 sec (mechanical, approx.)
- Flash bracketing: Yes
- Compatible flashes: Panasonic external flashes / third party

Shutter
- Frame rate: Up to 60 fps stills electronic burst (AFS), 14 fps mechanical
- Shutter: Mechanical focal-plane shutter and electronic shutter
- Shutter speed range: Mechanical: approx. 60–1/8000 sec Electronic: up to 1/32,000 sec
- Shutter speeds: 60–1/8000 sec (mechanical), 1/32000 (electronic), bulb mode supported
- Continuous shooting: Up to 60 fps (electronic), 14 fps (mechanical)

Viewfinder
- Viewfinder: Electronic viewfinder (OLED)
- Viewfinder magnification: 1.6x (0.8× 35mm equivalent)
- Frame coverage: Approx. 100%

Image processing
- Image processor: Venus Engine
- White balance: Presets and custom
- WB bracketing: Yes
- Dynamic range compressor: Dynamic Range Boost (13+ stop mode)

General
- Video recording: 5.8K / 5.7K Open Gate (4:3 / 17:9) up to 30p 5.7K ProRes 422 HQ internal up to 30p 5.7K ProRes RAW HQ internal up to 30p C4K / DCI 4K up to 120p UHD 4K up to 120p Full HD up to 240p VFR
- LCD screen: 3.0-inch fully articulated TFT touchscreen LCD, 1.8M-dot resolution
- Battery: DMW-BLK22 rechargeable Li-ion battery USB-PD rechargeable
- Optional battery packs: Battery grip
- Optional accessories: Battery grip, microphone adapter, remote shutter release, external SSD, cages, flashes
- AV port(s): HDMI Type-A, 3.5mm mic, 3.5mm headphone, USB-C
- Data port(s): USB-C, Wi-Fi, Bluetooth
- Body features: Magnesium alloy body, weather-sealed, IBIS (up to 7.5 stops)
- Dimensions: 138.4 mm × 100.3 mm × 99.6 mm (5.45 in × 3.95 in × 3.92 in)
- Weight: 721 g (25 oz) (1.590 lb)(body only, with battery and card varies)
- Made in: PR China

Chronology
- Replaced: Panasonic Lumix DC-GH6

The Panasonic LUMIX DC-GH7 (also known as the LUMIX GH7) is a digital, mirrorless interchangeable-lens camera released by Panasonic in 2024 as part of the LUMIX GH series of Micro Four Thirds video cameras. It is designed as a hybrid model that includes features for both still photography and advanced functionality for videographers. It introduced internal ProRes RAW recording, the option for 32-bit float audio, and 4K/120p capture for video in addition to advanced photo features introduced in Panasonic’s G9II. The GH7 is also the first Panasonic camera with the capability of using ARRI’s LogC3 profiles.

It is the successor to the LUMIX GH6 launched in 2022 and part of the LUMIX GH series that launched in 2009.

== Features ==
=== Video capabilities ===
The GH7 has Full HD recording from 24p to 240p and 4K/C4K recording from 24p to 120p, with selectable 8-bit or 10-bit color depth and Long GOP or All-Intra compression options depending on mode.

The GH7 also provides Open Gate recording up to 5.8K in the 4:3 aspect ratio which allows for reframing in widescreen and vertical delivery. It can shoot 4K120 at DCI or UHD (16:9) and also has high frame rates like 60fps in 5.7K, 120fps in C4K, and up to 240fps in HD all without sensor crop. One new mode allows the GH7 to shoot 1080.240P while recording audio.

In addition to ProRes, the GH7 also records in QuickTime MOV format with HEVC/H.265 encoding or in MP4 with H.264 encoding which doesn’t need as much power to edit.

For audio, the GH7’s built-in microphone has 24-bit capture. However, it also supports the optional Panasonic DMW-XLR2 XLR microphone adapter, enabling 96 kHz/32-bit float recording and up to 4-channel 32-bit float capture with external microphones. In 2026, Panasonic also announced planned compatibility with the LUMIX DMS1 microphone, intended to improve audio quality without additional cables.

The GH7’s CFexpress card slot facilitates the recording of high-end codecs, but the GH7 also allows Apple ProRes RAW format to be recorded directly to the card or to an external SSD, a feature uncommon in mirrorless cameras when it launched. Open Gate 5.8K RAW recording is available externally via compatible Atomos or Blackmagic recorders.

The LUMIX GH7 won CineD’s award for best Mirrorless/Hybrid Camera of the Year 2024.

=== Still photography features ===
The GH7 includes still-photography functions such as a handheld high-resolution mode producing images up to 100 megapixels, pre-burst capture, and continuous shooting at up to 60 frames per second with the electronic shutter or 10 frames per second with the mechanical shutter. It has 25MP still with 100MP multi-shot sampling.

The GH7 mimics the still photography features of the G9II including 100MP handheld Hi-Res, 75fps burst shooting and the ability to apply Real Time LUTs to JPEGs.

A drive dial allows photographers to quickly switch between single, burst, self-timer, and multi shot sampling. 16-bit Raw photos handle edits well.

=== Autofocus ===
The GH7 shares the Hybrid Phase Detect autofocus also found on the G9II and the S-series LUMIX cameras which marks a change from the GH6’s only contrast-based autofocus. Phase detection is better at tracking and predicting subject motion and supports faster frame rates for photography. For example, the GH7 upgraded to 60fps drive with continuous focus from the GH6’s 8fps. The GH7 also has a pre-capture mode to buffer action for up to 1.5 seconds, which aids with unpredictable subjects like sports or wildlife.

The GH7 introduced new subject detection capabilities that can recognize humans, animals, cars, bikes, trains, planes, as well as smaller parts like eyes or the front of a vehicle.

=== Body ===
The body of the GH7 has a magnesium alloy frame and is weather-sealed. It can also operate in temperatures ranging from -10°F to 104°F. Its dimensions are approximately 100 mm x 100 mm x 138 mm and it weighs 721g. Dual memory card slots include one CFexpress Type B slot and one SD (UHS II) slot.

The GH7 also features an OLED electronic viewfinder with 3.7 million dots and magnification up to 0.76x. It has a selectable 60/120fps refresh rate. The rear LCD display is a three-inch articulating 1.84-million dot touchscreen that can flip and rotate. It can also lock in place and it is possible to magnify the on-screen display to check focus while recording.

The GH7 body includes several features oriented toward video production. Its internal cooling fan allows for unlimited recording. It also has record buttons on the front and back as well as front and rear tally lamps that are helpful to vloggers or anyone recording themselves or working alone. Timecode synchronization is supported via the PC sync-to-BNC adapter cable.

=== Image sensor ===
The GH7 features a 25.2 megapixel BSI CMOS sensor. It has a maximum image resolution of 5776 x 4336 pixels in the native 4:3 aspect ratio as well as cropped formats. The sensor is shared with the LUMIX G9II and improves on the focus and dynamic range of the GH6. The new sensor uses an updated dual output gain system that combines low-gain and high-gain readouts into a 16-bit RAW file, which helps preserve highlights, reduce shadow noise, and increase dynamic range.

The camera uses a mechanical shutter with 1/250 second flash synchronization and also has a silent electronic shutter option.

Its standard sensitivity range is ISO 100–25,600 and includes an ISO 50 option for longer exposures in bright light and a base ISO of 500 when recording in V-Log. It has Dynamic Range Boost through its full ISO range.

The GH7 also has a sensor-shift high-resolution mode that can create 50.5-megapixel or 100-megapixel images in RAW or JPEG format, as well as a Live Composite mode for long-exposure photography.

=== Lenses ===
The GH7 is a Micro Four Thirds system camera and works with a wide variety of Micro Four Thirds lenses. Many of these are relatively compact telephoto lenses compared with many larger-sensor systems. They also have a 2× crop factor relative to full frame, which can be advantageous for telephoto photography such as wildlife and birding.

=== In-body image stabilization ===
Image stabilization on the GH7 is CIPA rated at up to 7.5 stops using in-body image stabilization (IBIS) and Dual I.S. 2 with compatible lenses. It includes Panasonic’s Active I.S. system, introduced with the Lumix S5II series, which uses data from a high-precision gyroscope and automatically improves handheld stabilization while walking or with longer lenses. The gyroscope can also detect when a video is being shot in vertical format, which is helpful for anyone recording for social media purposes.

The GH7 combines sensor-shift and electronic stabilization systems, which reviewers described as highly effective. It has a Boost IS mode, which tries to minimize movement for a tripod-like look when shooting video and electronic image stabilization (E.I.S.) for video. These systems can be used together to reduce shake in handheld recording.

=== Connectivity and smart features ===
The GH7 has ports for a full-size HDMI cable as well as USB-C and a 3.5mm microphone and headphone jack. There is also a flash sync port on the front of the camera that supports Timecode output, and the camera comes with a BNC adapter. It also has a hot shoe to support an external flash.

The GH7 has native support for Frame.io to tether the camera to the cloud, as well as live streaming capabilities (without USB webcam support). It can also integrate with the LUMIX Lab app as well as the LUMIX Sync app for remote control and file transfer. It also supports external SSD recording.

The GH7 also has proxy recording up to Cinema 4k (but no open gate proxy) for easy to share low resolution files alongside high-bit-rate video.

=== Assist tools ===
For video, features include anamorphic support like desqueeze and assist tools including waveforms and vectorscopes displays. The GH7 can license the ARRI LOGC3 color profile.

New to the GH-series, the GH7 has Real time (LUT) and the ability to download LUTs from the LUMIX Lab app, or create and upload them to the camera. It can store up to 39 custom LUTs.

=== Similar cameras ===
The GH7 shares the same chassis design and display equipment as the LUMIX GH6 as well as all the photography features from the LUMIX G9II. It also has the same 15.8Wh DMW-BLK22 battery as the LUMIX GH5 and GH6 and other Panasonic cameras. It is CIPA rated for 380 photos or about 100 minutes of video.

The GH7 is often compared to the LUMIX S5II and the LUMIX G9II within Panasonic’s offerings.

== Reception ==
Reviewers at CineD highlighted the GH7’s autofocus upgrade, effective stabilization, and audio capabilities when awarding it the best Mirrorless/Hybrid Camera of the Year 2024. PCMag mentioned that it records “cinema-grade” movies and that its ProRes video and ability to record all day because of the built-in fan are the features that make this camera notable. It is especially useful for handheld recording because it is smaller and easier to carry than traditional cinema cameras. While a lot of focus has been put on the GH7’s video capabilities, it also has a lot of features for still photography and is recommended as a hybrid camera.

Some reviewers pointed out that while the camera has advanced audio options, it requires an external microphone because the internal microphone is not as clear. Others found it to be on the expensive side for the size of its sensor.

| Brand | Form | Class | 2008 | 2009 | 2010 | 2011 | | | 2012 | 2013 | 2014 | 2015 | 2016 | 2017 | 2018 | 2019 | 2020 | 2021 | 2022 | 2023 | 2024 | 2025 | 2026 |
| Olympus | SLR style OM-D | Professional | | | | | | | | | | | | | | | E-M1X ^{R} | | | | | | |
| Olympus | SLR style OM-D | High-end | | | | | | | | | E-M1 | | | E-M1 II ^{R} | | | E-M1 III ^{R} | | | | | | |
| Olympus | SLR style OM-D | Advanced | | | | | | | E-M5 | | | E-M5 II ^{R} | | | | | E-M5 III ^{R} | | | | | | |
| Olympus | SLR style OM-D | Mid-range | | | | | | | | | E-M10 | | E-M10 II | | E-M10 III | | | E-M10 IV | | | | | |
| Olympus | Rangefinder style PEN | Mid-range | | E-P1 | E-P2 | | E-P3 | | | | E-P5 | | PEN-F ^{R} | | | | | | | | | | |
| Olympus | Rangefinder style PEN | Upper-entry | | | E-PL1 | E-PL2 | | E-PL3 | E-PL5 | | E-PL6 | E-PL7 | | E-PL8 | E-PL9 | | E-PL10 | | | | | | |
| Olympus | Rangefinder style PEN | Entry-level | | | | | E-PM1 | | E-PM2 | | | | | | | | | | | | | | |
| Olympus | remote | | | | | | | | | | | | | Air | | | | | | | | | |
| OM System | SLR style | Professional | | | | | | | | | | | | | | | | | OM-1 ^{R} | | OM-1 II ^{R} | | |
| OM System | SLR style | High-end | | | | | | | | | | | | | | | | | | | | OM-3 ^{R} | |
| OM System | SLR style | Advanced | | | | | | | | | | | | | | | | | | OM-5 ^{R} | | | OM-5 II ^{R} |
| OM System | PEN | Mid-range | | | | | | | | | | | | | | | | | E-P7 | | | | |
| Panasonic | SLR style | High-end Video | | | | | | | | | | | | | GH5S | | | | GH6 ^{R} | | | GH7 ^{R} | |
| Panasonic | SLR style | High-end Photo | | | | | | | | | | | | | G9 ^{R} | | | | | | G9 II ^{R} | | |
| Panasonic | SLR style | High-end | | GH1 | | GH2 | | | GH3 | | GH4 | | | | GH5 | | | | GH5II | | | | |
| Panasonic | SLR style | Mid-range | | G1 | G2 | | G3 | | G5 | | G6 | | G7 | G80/G85 | | | G90/G95 | | | | | | |
| Panasonic | SLR style | Entry-level | | | G10 | | | | | | | | | | | | | G100 | | | G100D | | |
| Panasonic | Rangefinder style | Advanced | | | | | | | GX1 | | GX7 | | GX8 | | GX9 | | | | | | | | |
| Panasonic | Rangefinder style | Mid-range | | | | | | | | | GM1 | GM5 | GX80/GX85 | | | | | | | | | | |
| Panasonic | Rangefinder style | Entry-level | | | GF1 | GF2 | GF3 | | GF5 | | GF6 | GF7 | GF8 | GX800/GX850/GF9 | | GX880/GF10/GF90 | | | | | | | |
| Panasonic | Camcorder | Professional | | | | | | | AG-AF104 | | | | | | | | | | | | | | |
| Kodak | Rangefinder style | Entry-level | | | | | | | | | | S-1 | | | | | | | | | | | |
| DJI | Drone | . | | | | | | | | | | | | Zenmuse X5S | | | | | | | | | |
| DJI | Drone | . | | | | | | | | | | | | Zenmuse X5 | | | | | | | | | |
| YI | Rangefinder style | Entry-level | | | | | | | | | | | | M1 | | | | | | | | | |
| Yongnuo | Rangefinder style | Android camera | | | | | | | | | | | | | | | YN450M | | YN455 | | | | |
| Blackmagic Design | Rangefinder style | High-End Video | | | | | | | Cinema Camera | | | | | | | | | | | | | | |
| Blackmagic Design | Rangefinder style | High-End Video | | | | | | | | | Pocket Cinema Camera | | | | | Pocket Cinema Camera 4K | | | | | | | |
| Blackmagic Design | | High-End Video | | | | | | | | | | Micro Cinema Camera | | | | | | | | | Micro Studio Camera 4K G2 | | |
| Z CAM | Cinema | Advanced | | | | | | | | | | | E1 | | | E2 | | | | | | | |
| Z CAM | Cinema | Mid-Range | | | | | | | | | | | | | | | | E2-M4 | | | | | |
| Z CAM | Cinema | Entry-Level | | | | | | | | | | | | | | | E2C | | | | | | |
| JVC | Camcorder | Professional | | | | | | | | | | GY-LS300 | | | | | | | | | | | |
| SVS-Vistek | | Industrial | | | | | | | EVO Tracer | | | | | | | | | | | | | | |
