= Panasonic Lumix DC-GH6 =

Camera model

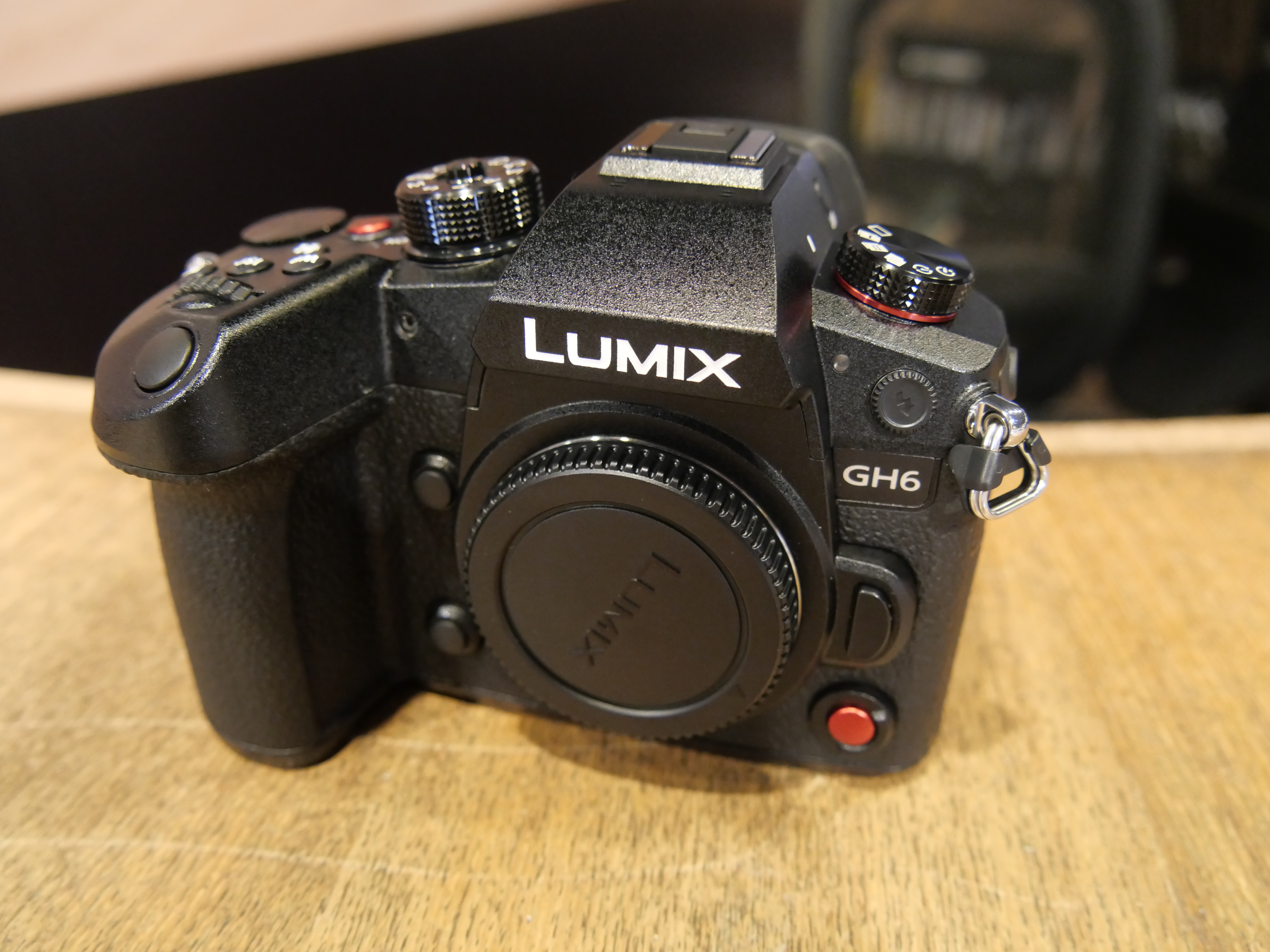

Overview
- Maker: Panasonic Corporation
- Type: Mirrorless digital camera
- Released: February 2022

Lens
- Lens mount: Micro Four Thirds

Sensor/medium
- Sensor: 4/3-type
- Sensor type: Live MOS
- Sensor size: 17.3 × 13 mm
- Maximum resolution: 5776 × 4336 px (25.21 megapixels)
- Film speed: ISO 100–25600, extendable to 50 (Note: In V-Log the ISO range is 250–12800, extendable to 125)
- Recording medium: 1× SD / SDHC / SDXC UHS-II + 1× CFexpress Type B

Focusing
- Focus: Switchable auto and manual
- Focus modes: AF-S (single), AF-C (continuous), manual
- Focus areas: 225 Contrast Detection AF points

Exposure/metering
- Exposure modes: Program AE; Aperture priority, Shutter priority, Manual
- Metering modes: Multiple, Center-weighted, Spot, Highlight-weighted

Flash
- Flash synchronization: 1/250
- Flash bracketing: ±5 EV in 1/3 EV steps (Note: ±3 EV for motion picture)

Shutter
- Shutter: Focal plane mechanical shutter / Electronic shutter
- Shutter speed range: 1/32000 to 60 s, Bulb
- Continuous shooting: 14 fps

Viewfinder
- Viewfinder: OLED viewfinder; 3.68M dots
- Viewfinder magnification: 0.76×

Image processing
- Image processor: Venus Engine
- White balance: Auto, Cloudy, Shade, Incandescent, Flash, Daylight, White Set 1/2/3/4, Custom WB based on color temperature

General
- Video recording: MP4 / MOV / Apple ProRes; 6K, 4K, Full HD
- LCD screen: 3.0", 1.84M dots, free-angle with touchscreen
- Battery: 7.2 V 2200 mAh lithium-ion battery pack
- AV port: HDMI type-A
- Data port(s): Wi-Fi, Bluetooth, USB 3.2 Gen2 (10 Gbit/s) Type-C
- Body features: 5-axis in-body image stabilization, Dual I.S. 2
- Dimensions: 138.4×100.3×99.6 mm (5.45×3.95×3.92 in)
- Weight: 739 g (26 oz) (body); 823 g (with battery, one SD card)

Chronology
- Predecessor: Lumix GH5 II
- Successor: Panasonic Lumix DC-GH7

The Panasonic Lumix DC-GH6 is a mirrorless interchangeable-lens camera introduced by Panasonic in February 2022. It uses the Micro Four Thirds lens mount and is the successor to the GH5 series of video-focussed mirrorless cameras.

== Features ==
Compared to the GH5, the GH6 features a new 25.2-megapixel image sensor with dual output gain. It adds support for recording in Apple ProRes 422 and 422 HQ formats. Alongside an SD card slot, the camera has a CFexpress Type B card slot instead of a second SD card slot.

6K/4K Photo and Post Focus modes have been removed. The camera has an updated built-in noise reduction, branded as '3D Noise Reduction' compared to the '2D' system used by the GH5.

Like its predecessor, the GH6 uses Panasonic's Depth-from-Defocus autofocus system.

The Lumix GH6 adds a built-in cooling fan, allowing the camera to capture up to 4K 60FPS video in 10-bit 4:2:2 for unlimited lengths, while higher resolution and/or framerate modes can be captured for extended periods. The fan can be configured by the user to run automatically based on temperature, or continuously.

The 3.0", 1.84-million-dot rear LCD of the GH6 is touch-sensitive, and can be tilted and articulated. The camera also has an OLED electronic viewfinder (EVF) with 0.76× magnification.

The camera can record up to four channels of audio via an optional adapter in addition to the 3.5 mm microphone input jack. It also adds a dedicated button for accessing audio settings, in addition to another function button.

The Lumix GH6 supports recording video directly to an external USB SSD with a firmware update. In addition to recording on SSDs, the Lumix GH6 will record onto USB flash drives that have a USB-C connector.

== Notes and references ==
Brand	Form	Class	2008	2009	2010	2011			2012	2013	2014	2015	2016	2017	2018	2019	2020	2021	2022	2023	2024	2025	2026
Olympus	SLR style OM-D	Professional															E-M1X ^{R}						
Olympus	SLR style OM-D	High-end									E-M1			E-M1 II ^{R}			E-M1 III ^{R}						
Olympus	SLR style OM-D	Advanced							E-M5			E-M5 II ^{R}					E-M5 III ^{R}						
Olympus	SLR style OM-D	Mid-range									E-M10		E-M10 II		E-M10 III			E-M10 IV					
Olympus	Rangefinder style PEN	Mid-range		E-P1	E-P2		E-P3				E-P5		PEN-F ^{R}										
Olympus	Rangefinder style PEN	Upper-entry			E-PL1	E-PL2		E-PL3	E-PL5		E-PL6	E-PL7		E-PL8	E-PL9		E-PL10						
Olympus	Rangefinder style PEN	Entry-level					E-PM1		E-PM2														
Olympus	remote													Air									
OM System	SLR style	Professional																	OM-1 ^{R}		OM-1 II ^{R}		
OM System	SLR style	High-end																				OM-3 ^{R}	
OM System	SLR style	Advanced																		OM-5 ^{R}			OM-5 II ^{R}
OM System	PEN	Mid-range																	E-P7				
Panasonic	SLR style	High-end Video													GH5S				GH6 ^{R}			GH7 ^{R}	
Panasonic	SLR style	High-end Photo													G9 ^{R}						G9 II ^{R}		
Panasonic	SLR style	High-end		GH1		GH2			GH3		GH4				GH5				GH5II				
Panasonic	SLR style	Mid-range		G1	G2		G3		G5		G6		G7	G80/G85			G90/G95						
Panasonic	SLR style	Entry-level			G10													G100			G100D		
Panasonic	Rangefinder style	Advanced							GX1		GX7		GX8		GX9								
Panasonic	Rangefinder style	Mid-range									GM1	GM5	GX80/GX85										
Panasonic	Rangefinder style	Entry-level			GF1	GF2	GF3		GF5		GF6	GF7	GF8	GX800/GX850/GF9		GX880/GF10/GF90							
Panasonic	Camcorder	Professional							AG-AF104														
Kodak	Rangefinder style	Entry-level										S-1											
DJI	Drone	.												Zenmuse X5S									
DJI	Drone	.												Zenmuse X5									
YI	Rangefinder style	Entry-level												M1									
Yongnuo	Rangefinder style	Android camera															YN450M		YN455				
Blackmagic Design	Rangefinder style	High-End Video							Cinema Camera														
Blackmagic Design	Rangefinder style	High-End Video									Pocket Cinema Camera					Pocket Cinema Camera 4K							
Blackmagic Design		High-End Video										Micro Cinema Camera									Micro Studio Camera 4K G2		
Z CAM	Cinema	Advanced											E1			E2							
Z CAM	Cinema	Mid-Range																E2-M4					
Z CAM	Cinema	Entry-Level															E2C						
JVC	Camcorder	Professional										GY-LS300											
SVS-Vistek		Industrial							EVO Tracer														
