= Blackmagic Pocket Cinema Camera =

Range of handheld digital film cameras

Blackmagic Pocket Cinema Cameras
Overview
- Maker: Blackmagic Design
- Type: Digital movie camera
- Released: 2013; 13 years ago

Lens
- Lens mount: Canon EF (Active); MFT; L-Mount
- Lens: Interchangeable

Sensor/medium
- Sensor size: Super 16, Micro Four Thirds system, Super 35, Full-frame DSLR
- Maximum resolution: 1080p, 4K, 6K
- Recording medium: Apple ProRes and/or Blackmagic Raw
- Storage media: CFast, CFexpress, SD card, and external SSDs

Shutter
- Frame rate: Up to 120fps

Viewfinder
- Electronic viewfinder: Some models are compatible with a separately sold EVF

General
- Battery: LP-E6, NP-F570

The Blackmagic Pocket Cinema Camera (often simply the Pocket Camera or BMPCC) is a line of digital movie cameras developed and manufactured by Blackmagic Design and was first released 2013.

== History ==
The initial version of the Blackmagic Pocket Cinema Camera was announced in April 2013. It featured a Super 16 1080p sensor and a Micro Four Thirds mount. It was initially only capable of recording in Apple ProRes, though a later updated allowed recording of CinemaDNG Raw.

In April of 2018, Blackmagic Design announced an updated model, the Pocket Cinema Camera 4K, at a launch price of US$1,295. The first in the Pocket Cinema Camera line with the ability to shoot 4K video, this model included a 4/3 image sensor and mount, and is capable of both ProRes and Blackmagic Raw.

In August 2019, Blackmagic Design released the Blackmagic Pocket Cinema Camera 6K with a Super 35 camera sensor and EF mount for US$2,495.

In February 2021, Blackmagic Design released the Blackmagic Pocket Cinema Camera 6K Pro, an updated version of the Pocket Cinema Camera 6K, which features internal ND filters, additional EVF port, and a 5" high brightness flip-out screen.

In June 2022, Blackmagic Design announced the second generation of the 6K model - the Pocket Cinema Camera 6K G2, featuring a redesigned body which now resembles the 6K Pro's and utilizes many features found on the 6K Pro, but was designed without built in ND filters.

In September 2023, Blackmagic Design released the Blackmagic Cinema Camera 6K, which is Blackmagic Design's first full frame cinema camera. Despite no longer including "pocket" in the name, it is sold alongside the rest of the "pocket" series, and is compatible with the Pocket Cinema Camera Pro EVF.

== Design ==
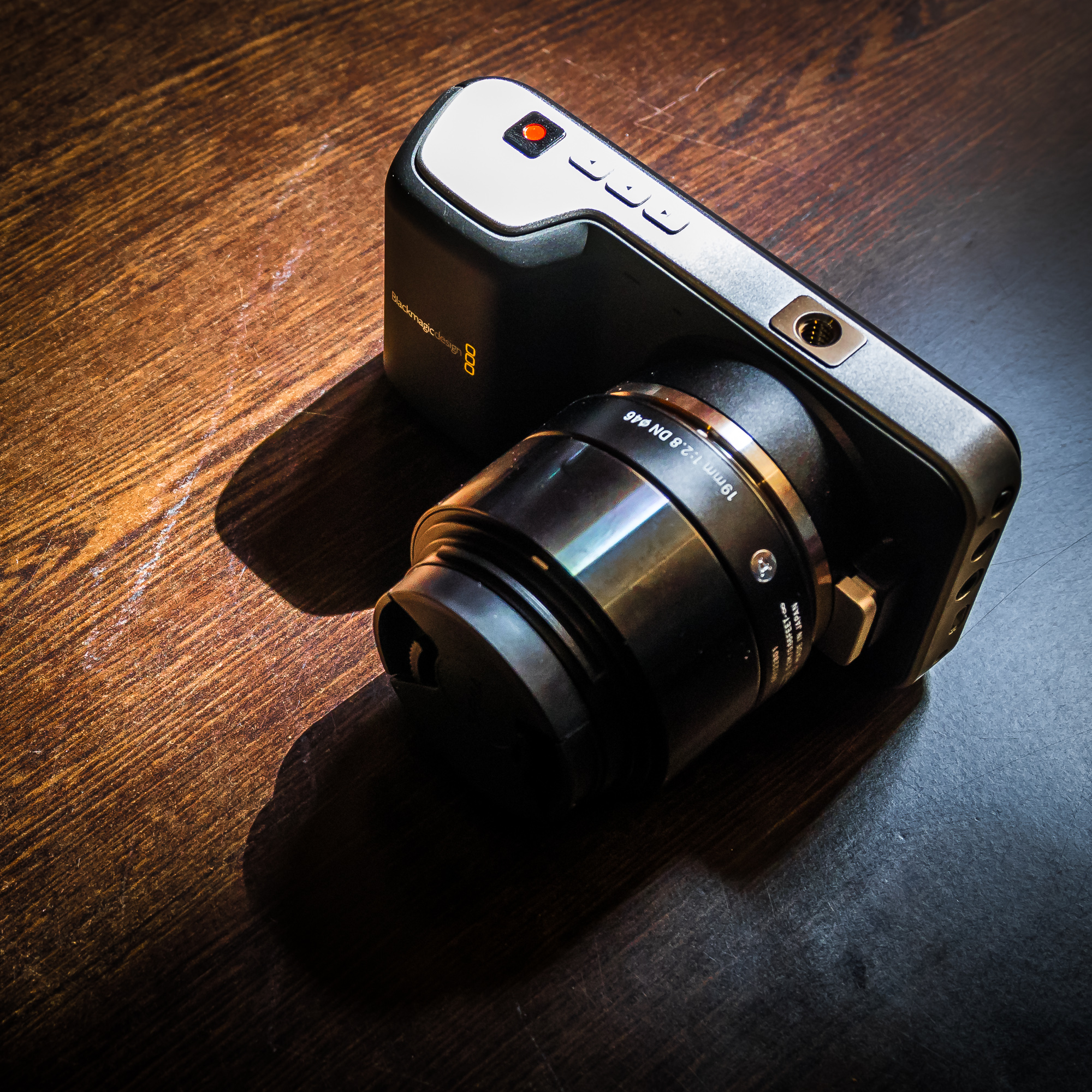
Original (1080p) BMPCC

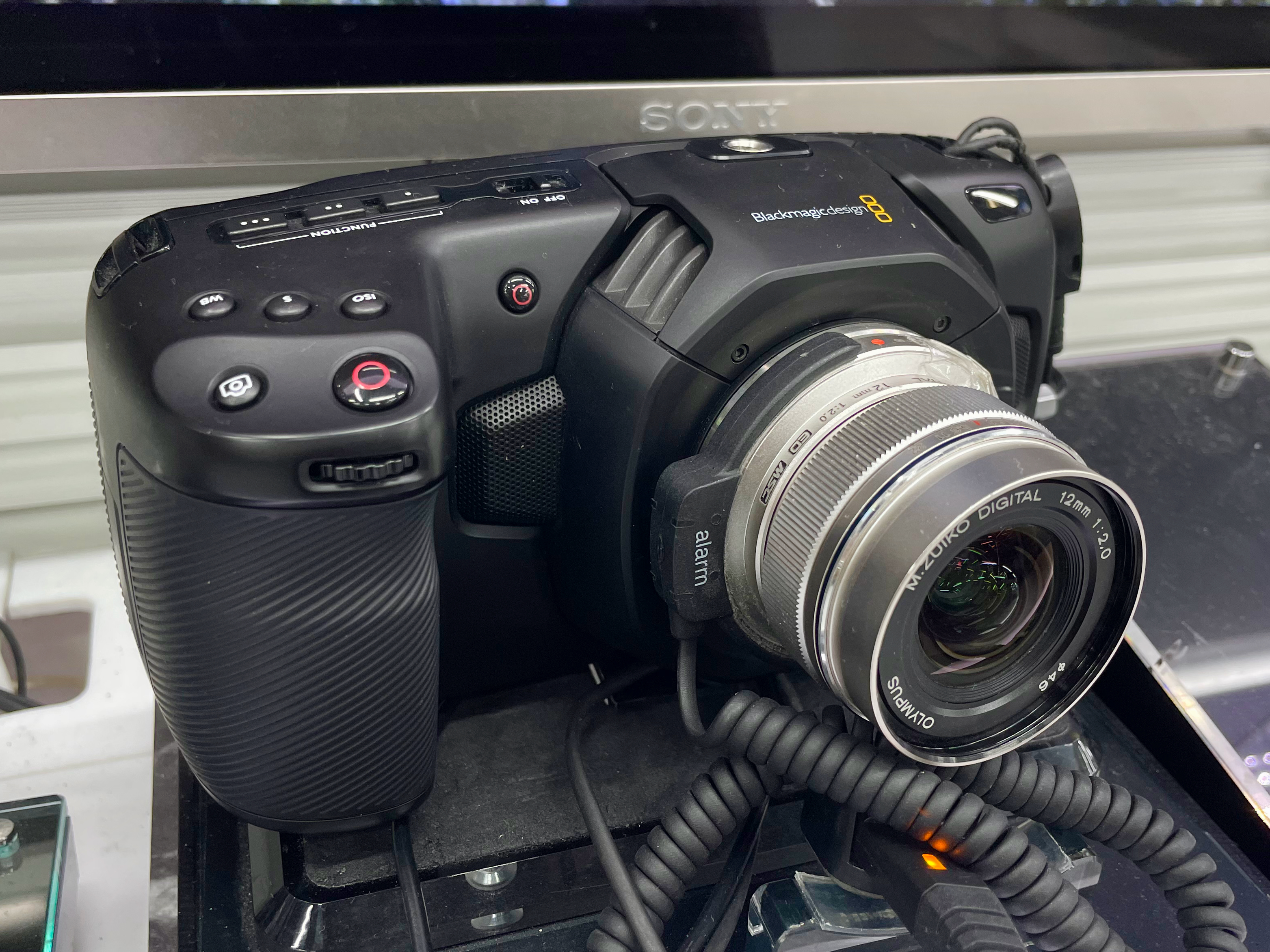
Updated BMPCC 4K

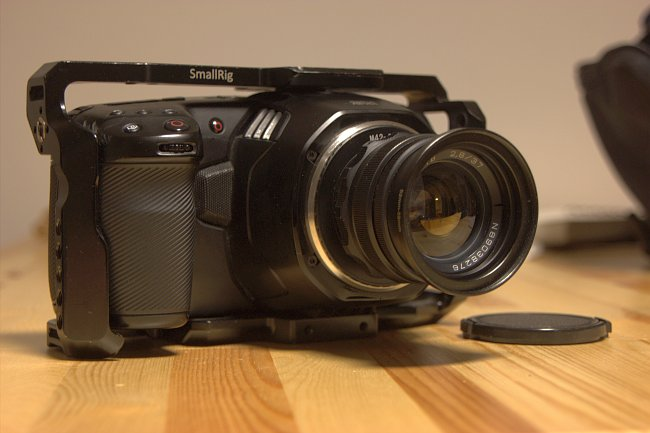
BMPCC 6K with a Soviet Mir-1V(Мир-1В) M42 mount lens.

=== Specifications and hardware ===
BMPCC models
| Model Name (Number) | Lens mount | W×H×D | Wgt. | Sensor size | Max. resolution | Frame rate @ max res | Codec(s) | Ref(s) |
|---|---|---|---|---|---|---|---|---|
| BMPCC (CINECAMPOCHDMFT) | MFT | 128 mm × 66 mm × 38 mm (5.0 in × 2.6 in × 1.5 in) | 355 g (12.5 oz) | Super 16 (12.48 × 7.02 mm) | 1920×1080 | 30p | CinemaDNG, ProRes 422 | |
| 4K (CINECAMPOCHDMFT4K) | MFT | 178 mm × 97 mm × 86 mm (7 in × 3.8 in × 3.4 in) | 720 g (1.59 lb) | 4/3" (18.96 × 10 mm) | 4096×2160 | 60p | Blackmagic RAW, ProRes 422 | |
| 6K (CINECAMPOCHDEF6K) | EF | 178 mm × 97 mm × 102 mm (7 in × 3.8 in × 4 in) | 900 g (1.98 lb) | Super 35 (23.10 × 12.99 mm) | 6144×3456 | 50p | Blackmagic RAW, ProRes 422 | |
| 6K Pro (CINECAMPOCHDEF06P) | EF | 180 mm × 123 mm × 112 mm (7.08 in × 4.84 in × 4.41 in) | 1,240 g (2.73 lb) | Super 35 (23.10 × 12.99 mm) | 6144×3456 | 50p | Blackmagic RAW, ProRes 422 | |
| 6K G2 (CINECAMPOCHDEF6K2) | EF | 180 mm × 123 mm × 112 mm (7.08 in × 4.84 in × 4.41 in) | 1,200 g (2.65 lb) | Super 35 (23.10 × 12.99 mm) | 6144×3456 | 50p | Blackmagic RAW, ProRes 422 | |
| Cinema 6K (CINECAM60KLFL) | L-Mount | 180 mm × 122 mm × 94 mm (7.08 in × 4.80 in × 3.70 in) | 1,200 g (2.65 lb) | Full Frame (36 × 24 mm) | 6048×4032 | 36p | Blackmagic RAW | |

The Blackmagic Pocket Cinema Cameras come with Canon EF, MFT, or L-Mount lens mounts, depending on the model. Most of the lineup supports recording in both Apple ProRes and Blackmagic Raw (Blackmagic Design's proprietary compressed raw codec), often simultaneously - though the original Pocket Cinema Camera was only capable of ProRes recording, and the Cinema Camera 6K is only capable of Blackmagic Raw. The current lineup is designed to be comfortably hand held, and are compatible with accessories like an external battery grip and EVF. The entire line Pocket Cinema Cameras are advertised to offer up to 13 stops of dynamic range, and is capable of recording to removable flash media or external SSDs.
