= Advanced Professional Video =

Video codec

- Abbreviation: APV
- Year started: 6 October 2023
- Latest version: 1.1.3.0; October 11, 2026
- Organization: Academy Software Foundation
- Authors: Youngkwon Lim; Minwoo Park; Madhukar Budagavi; Rajan Joshi; Kwang Pyo Choi
- Base standards: RFC 9924
- Domain: Video compression
- Website: github.com/AcademySoftwareFoundation/openapv

Advanced Professional Video (APV) developed by Samsung Electronics Co., Ltd., is a royalty-free video codec designed for professional-level high-quality video recording and post production. It has been proposed to IETF and is supported across a variety of devices.

== Features ==
- Perceptually lossless video quality that is close to the original, uncompressed quality
- Low complexity and high throughput intra frame only coding without pixel domain prediction
- Real-time encoding and decoding at resolutions up to 8K
- Designed as an intermediate codec for video editing, not for content distribution.
- Optimized for parallel processing on multi-core CPUs and GPUs
- High-quality chroma subsampling (4:0:0, 4:2:2, 4:4:4, and 4:4:4:4).
- Bit depths ranging from 10 to 16.
- High bit-rates up to a few Gbps for 2K, 4K and 8K resolution content, enabled by a lightweight entropy coding scheme
- Frame tiling for immersive content and for enabling parallel encoding and decoding
- Multiple decoding and re-encoding without severe visual quality degradation
- Various metadata including HDR10/10+ and user-defined format

== History ==
In 2023, Samsung Developer Conference was introduced the first APV lossless video quality up to 20%.

October 31, 2024: Samsung would join the Academy Software Foundation for the APV project.

== Technical specification ==
The Advanced Professional Video (APV) codec is defined as an intra‑frame, visually lossless compression format intended for professional recording, editing, and mastering. It encodes each frame independently using block‑based transforms and lightweight entropy coding, avoiding inter‑frame prediction to ensure low latency and predictable performance in post‑production workflows. The design emphasizes perceptual fidelity close to uncompressed video, with support for high bit‑rates up to several gigabits per second at 2K, 4K, and 8K resolutions. APV accommodates chroma subsampling formats from 4:0:0 through 4:4:4:4, including alpha channel support, and bit depths from 10 to 16 bits per component. Profiles are currently defined for 10‑bit and 12‑bit operation, with compatibility for wide‑gamut and high‑dynamic‑range color spaces. A tile‑based frame structure enables parallel encoding and decoding, improving throughput for immersive content and multi‑core processing environments. The intra‑only design allows multiple re‑encoding cycles with minimal cumulative degradation, while localized coding boundaries provide resilience against error propagation.

== Adoption and implementations ==
=== Reference implementation ===
- OpenAPV

=== Adoption ===
- Android 16
- Blackmagic Design DaVinci Resolve 20.2
- FFmpeg
- Blackmagic Design Camera for Android
- Integrated into Samsung Galaxy flagship devices starting with Galaxy S26.
- Snapdragon 8 Elite Gen 5
- calibrated software Tin Man

== See also ==
- Apple ProRes
- DNxHR codec
- CineForm
