= Asia Pacific Vision =

APV
- Type: Private
- Industry: Video production; branding agency; digital content creation
- Founded: September 1991; 34 years ago
- Founder: Mark Erde; Adrian Brown
- Headquarters: 3 Gloucester Road, Wanchai, Hong Kong,
- Website: apv.asia

Asia Pacific Vision (APV) is a provider of news, factual and corporate television content across the Asia Pacific Region. The company was founded by Mark Erder and Adrian Brown in September 1991, and incorporated in Hong Kong in early 1992. Brown is a British reporter and Erder is an American documentary filmmaker.

== History ==
APV started as a supplier of news reports to international broadcasters that did not have adequate resources in Asia. Thus, it addressed a news coverage gap in that area. It soon built relationships with client broadcasters in Britain, Europe, North America and Australia. Its earliest clients included CNN, ABC America, Sky, Fox News, and the major Australian broadcasters TCN 9, Channel 7 and Channel 10. Mark Erder and Adrian Brown (Journalist) quickly recognized the importance of retaining all rights to their stories, a condition that enabled them to resell the same content to non-competing clients in other geographical markets.

As the date for the Hong Kong Handover approached, new opportunities emerged for APV to expand its production services and to offer satellite uplink and outside broadcast services. Later, APV. and the BBC entered into a documentary co-production deal. With the decision to pursue further documentary projects and program development, the company split its business into two divisions; APV Broadcast Services, that focused on the original news-focused services and APV Programming Division, that dealt with documentary and feature programming. While news and documentary film production remained APV's core business, by 1993, the company had begun to attract corporate clients as well.

With demand from corporate clients steadily increasing, the APV Corporate Services division was established to focus on the production of video news releases (VNR), marketing videos, internal training videos and customized media training, for both PR agencies and direct clients.

== Present Status ==
APV currently delivers documentary programming to National Geographic, AETN and other broadcasters. In addition, it supplies commissioned content to major corporations across the Asia Pacific region including HSBC, Cathay Pacific Airlines, Swire Pacific Ltd, Shangri-La Hotels, Alibaba, UBS, Prudential and several others.

Adapting to the changing economic and news climates of Hong Kong, today APV is focused on corporate work and branded content with producers specializing in the financial, hospitality, property and auction industries.

== Highlights ==
In 1992, APV entered a five-year production contract with the BBC that led to a five-part series documentary, "The Last Governor". Later (in 1999) The BBC and APV entered into a co-production deal to produce another documentary project, a history of foreign correspondents in Asia entitled "Of All The Gin Joints".

By 1997, APV hired more than 120 employees., and had been commissioned by 20 broadcasters from around the world, to cover the end of colonial rule in Hong Kong. APV provided video production services and local expertise to networks from Germany, Austria, Australia, Britain, France, Canada and the United States, in that period.

This led to the establishment of the company’s APV Operations Services division, that specialized in providing outside broadcast, uplink, and external facilities services.

In 2002, the performance of this division led to the formation of a joint venture focused specifically on providing satellite news gathering services and APV Link, based in Singapore. This JV only lasted a few years

The company’s performance in the corporate and broadcast markets have led many clients to seek APV’s guidance and production for the placement of their Branded Content. Both Hysan and The Grand Lisboa made corporate films with the intention of having them broadcast. The most successful placements were early productions for the Eastman Company which produced a half-hour show for placement on Chinese TV and for the US Department of Commerce which produced multi-part series for both the India and China markets, focusing on the benefits of a graduate education in the US. The most successful of these was a four-part series sponsored by Shangri-La Hotels and starring Zhang Ziyi. This was placed on NGCI and various in-flight entertainment channels for the CX and Singapore airlines APV. has played an instrumental role in the launching of the CNN Bureau in Hong Kong, and the Asian launches of Asia Wall Street Journal TV, ABN, CNBC and Fox.
